= DIN 91379 =

Unicode subset for Europe

The DIN standard DIN 91379: "Characters and defined character sequences in Unicode for the electronic processing of names and data exchange in Europe, with CD-ROM" defines a normative subset of Unicode Latin characters, sequences of base characters and diacritic signs, and special characters for use in names of persons, legal entities, products, addresses etc. The standard defines a normative mapping of Latin letters to base letters A-Z as an extension of the recommendations of ICAO.

In the informative part of the standard, a set of extended characters is defined, which includes Greek and Cyrillic letters as well as other special characters for names of legal entities and product names.

== Languages and scripts supported ==
The subset supports all official languages of European Union countries as well as the official languages of Iceland, Liechtenstein, Norway, Switzerland, and also the German minority languages.

To support other languages that do not use the Latin writing system, the set of normative letters contains all combinations of Latin letters with diacritical marks that are necessary for the transliteration of names into the Latin writing system according to the ISO standards relevant at the time of publication. (Note: The ISO 233-3, newly published in 2023, changed the transliteration of the Arabic character ض from ż (z with dot above for Persian ) to z̤ (Z with combining diaresis below). The necessary character combinations <U+005A,U+0324> (Z̤) or <U+007A,U+0324> (z̤) are not listed in the 2022 version of DIN 91379.)

The standard supports the necessary characters for entries in the civil status registers. According to the Law on the Convention of September 13, 1973 on the recording of surnames and forenames in civil status registers information in Latin characters is to be taken over true to the letter with all diacritic marks and information in other characters is to be reproduced by transliteration, if possible in accordance with ISO standards.

To be able to incorporate all the necessary characters and diacritics from entries using the Latin script in national civil registers, the standard would need to support not only the ISO-compliant transcriptions, but also all the characters employed in national transcription systems, as well as all characters used in languages written with Latin letters.

This support is not complete; for non-European languages that use Latin script, for example Vietnamese is supported, but not, for example, the Togo national languages Ewe (ɖ, ɛ, ƒ, ɣ, ɔ, ʋ are missing) and Kabiye (ɖ, ɛ, ɣ, ɩ, ɔ, ʊ are missing), the South African official language Tshivenda (ḓ, ḽ, ṋ, ṱ are missing), the Namibian national language Khoekhoegowab (the click sound letters ǀ, ǁ, ǃ, ǂ are missing), or Tongan (the fakauʻa is missing). Although the characters mentioned in brackets appear in personal names in the respective countries, the standard does not mention any transliteration rules or mapping rules for writing names in basic Latin letters.

In addition to the normative characters the standard defines subsets of extended characters that contain modern Greek letters for Greece and Cyprus, Cyrillic letters for Bulgaria and special characters for names of products and legal entities.

Conforming applications may support additional characters, however for interface agreements or registers it may be appropriate to support only a final subset of characters and sequences based on this standard.

The text of the predecessor, DIN SPEC 91379, explanations and lists of characters and sequences as Excel and XML files can be found in Koordinierungsstelle für IT-Standards (KoSIT). This reference contains also an XML schema file with patterns to check conformance of text to subsets defined in this standard. Lists of characters and sequences of DIN SPEC 91379 and DIN 91379 as plain text files are available via GitHub in DIN 91379 Characters and Sequences. The DIN contains few additional characters and sequences.

== Application of the standard ==
All IT procedures used for data exchange within and between the federal and state governments or for data exchange with citizens and companies must comply with DIN 91379 from 1 November 2024.

The architecture guideline for German federal IT demands the usage of the predecessor DIN SPEC 91379 in the version from July 2022.

Continuous text and historic letters are not in the scope of this norm.

== Structure of the standard ==
The DIN standard consists of a normative and an informative part.

The requirements in the normative part are binding for all compliant systems. In the normative part, the letters for processing names with basic Latin letters and diacritics are specified. All compliant systems must support these letters. Furthermore, a mapping of the normative letters to the basic Latin letters A-Z is defined.

A compliant system may support additional letters in addition to the normative letters.

The recommendations in the informative part are not binding for compliant systems. The informative part determines a UNICODE subset of extended letters, e.g. for legal entities, product names and for data exchange in the EU. In addition the informative part defines data types that can be used for checking data fields.

== Normative part ==
=== Compliance ===
To be compliant to this norm, it is required to

- support all normative letters and sequences at all processing stages,
- use the encoding UTF-8 at interfaces, and
- normalize the characters according to Unicode normalization form C (NFC).

=== Normative letters ===
Any conforming IT system must be able to process the normative letters in all name fields. This includes the collection, storage, transmission, display, and printout.

The normative character groups are given below. The associated characters can also be found in DIN 91379 Characters and Sequences for machine processing. The following tables of characters were generated from the XML file chars.xml in the DIN appendix.

==== Latin letters (bll) ====
These letters must be supported to represent names, especially personal names.

Table: Latin Letters (bll)
Code points	Name	Glyph
0041	LATIN CAPITAL LETTER A	A
0041 030B	LATIN CAPITAL LETTER A WITH COMBINING DOUBLE ACUTE ACCENT	A̋
0042	LATIN CAPITAL LETTER B	B
0043	LATIN CAPITAL LETTER C	C
0043 0300	LATIN CAPITAL LETTER C WITH COMBINING GRAVE ACCENT	C̀
0043 0304	LATIN CAPITAL LETTER C WITH COMBINING MACRON	C̄
0043 0306	LATIN CAPITAL LETTER C WITH COMBINING BREVE	C̆
0043 0308	LATIN CAPITAL LETTER C WITH COMBINING DIAERESIS	C̈
0043 0315	LATIN CAPITAL LETTER C WITH COMBINING COMMA ABOVE RIGHT	C̕
0043 0323	LATIN CAPITAL LETTER C WITH COMBINING DOT BELOW	C̣
0043 0326	LATIN CAPITAL LETTER C WITH COMBINING COMMA BELOW	C̦
0043 0328 0306	LATIN CAPITAL LETTER C WITH COMBINING OGONEK AND COMBINING BREVE	C̨̆
0044	LATIN CAPITAL LETTER D	D
0044 0302	LATIN CAPITAL LETTER D WITH COMBINING CIRCUMFLEX ACCENT	D̂
0045	LATIN CAPITAL LETTER E	E
0046	LATIN CAPITAL LETTER F	F
0046 0300	LATIN CAPITAL LETTER F WITH COMBINING GRAVE ACCENT	F̀
0046 0304	LATIN CAPITAL LETTER F WITH COMBINING MACRON	F̄
0047	LATIN CAPITAL LETTER G	G
0047 0300	LATIN CAPITAL LETTER G WITH COMBINING GRAVE ACCENT	G̀
0048	LATIN CAPITAL LETTER H	H
0048 0304	LATIN CAPITAL LETTER H WITH COMBINING MACRON	H̄
0048 0326	LATIN CAPITAL LETTER H WITH COMBINING COMMA BELOW	H̦
0048 0331	LATIN CAPITAL LETTER H WITH COMBINING MACRON BELOW	H̱
0049	LATIN CAPITAL LETTER I	I
004A	LATIN CAPITAL LETTER J	J
004A 0301	LATIN CAPITAL LETTER J WITH COMBINING ACUTE ACCENT	J́
004A 030C	LATIN CAPITAL LETTER J WITH COMBINING CARON	J̌
004B	LATIN CAPITAL LETTER K	K
004B 0300	LATIN CAPITAL LETTER K WITH COMBINING GRAVE ACCENT	K̀
004B 0302	LATIN CAPITAL LETTER K WITH COMBINING CIRCUMFLEX ACCENT	K̂
004B 0304	LATIN CAPITAL LETTER K WITH COMBINING MACRON	K̄
004B 0307	LATIN CAPITAL LETTER K WITH COMBINING DOT ABOVE	K̇
004B 0315	LATIN CAPITAL LETTER K WITH COMBINING COMMA ABOVE RIGHT	K̕
004B 031B	LATIN CAPITAL LETTER K WITH COMBINING HORN	K̛
004B 0326	LATIN CAPITAL LETTER K WITH COMBINING COMMA BELOW	K̦
004B 035F 0048	LATIN CAPITAL LETTER K WITH COMBINING DOUBLE MACRON BELOW AND LATIN CAPITAL LETTER H	K͟H
004B 035F 0068	LATIN CAPITAL LETTER K WITH COMBINING DOUBLE MACRON BELOW AND LATIN SMALL LETTER H	K͟h
004C	LATIN CAPITAL LETTER L	L
004C 0302	LATIN CAPITAL LETTER L WITH COMBINING CIRCUMFLEX ACCENT	L̂
004C 0325	LATIN CAPITAL LETTER L WITH COMBINING RING BELOW	L̥
004C 0325 0304	LATIN CAPITAL LETTER L WITH COMBINING RING BELOW AND COMBINING MACRON	L̥̄
004C 0326	LATIN CAPITAL LETTER L WITH COMBINING COMMA BELOW	L̦
004D	LATIN CAPITAL LETTER M	M
004D 0300	LATIN CAPITAL LETTER M WITH COMBINING GRAVE ACCENT	M̀
004D 0302	LATIN CAPITAL LETTER M WITH COMBINING CIRCUMFLEX ACCENT	M̂
004D 0306	LATIN CAPITAL LETTER M WITH COMBINING BREVE	M̆
004D 0310	LATIN CAPITAL LETTER M WITH COMBINING CANDRABINDU	M̐
004E	LATIN CAPITAL LETTER N	N
004E 0302	LATIN CAPITAL LETTER N WITH COMBINING CIRCUMFLEX ACCENT	N̂
004E 0304	LATIN CAPITAL LETTER N WITH COMBINING MACRON	N̄
004E 0306	LATIN CAPITAL LETTER N WITH COMBINING BREVE	N̆
004E 0326	LATIN CAPITAL LETTER N WITH COMBINING COMMA BELOW	N̦
004F	LATIN CAPITAL LETTER O	O
0050	LATIN CAPITAL LETTER P	P
0050 0300	LATIN CAPITAL LETTER P WITH COMBINING GRAVE ACCENT	P̀
0050 0304	LATIN CAPITAL LETTER P WITH COMBINING MACRON	P̄
0050 0315	LATIN CAPITAL LETTER P WITH COMBINING COMMA ABOVE RIGHT	P̕
0050 0323	LATIN CAPITAL LETTER P WITH COMBINING DOT BELOW	P̣
0051	LATIN CAPITAL LETTER Q	Q
0052	LATIN CAPITAL LETTER R	R
0052 0306	LATIN CAPITAL LETTER R WITH COMBINING BREVE	R̆
0052 0325	LATIN CAPITAL LETTER R WITH COMBINING RING BELOW	R̥
0052 0325 0304	LATIN CAPITAL LETTER R WITH COMBINING RING BELOW AND COMBINING MACRON	R̥̄
0053	LATIN CAPITAL LETTER S	S
0053 0300	LATIN CAPITAL LETTER S WITH COMBINING GRAVE ACCENT	S̀
0053 0304	LATIN CAPITAL LETTER S WITH COMBINING MACRON	S̄
0053 031B 0304	LATIN CAPITAL LETTER S WITH COMBINING HORN AND COMBINING MACRON	S̛̄
0053 0331	LATIN CAPITAL LETTER S WITH COMBINING MACRON BELOW	S̱
0054	LATIN CAPITAL LETTER T	T
0054 0300	LATIN CAPITAL LETTER T WITH COMBINING GRAVE ACCENT	T̀
0054 0304	LATIN CAPITAL LETTER T WITH COMBINING MACRON	T̄
0054 0308	LATIN CAPITAL LETTER T WITH COMBINING DIAERESIS	T̈
0054 0315	LATIN CAPITAL LETTER T WITH COMBINING COMMA ABOVE RIGHT	T̕
0054 031B	LATIN CAPITAL LETTER T WITH COMBINING HORN	T̛
0055	LATIN CAPITAL LETTER U	U
0055 0307	LATIN CAPITAL LETTER U WITH COMBINING DOT ABOVE	U̇
0056	LATIN CAPITAL LETTER V	V
0057	LATIN CAPITAL LETTER W	W
0058	LATIN CAPITAL LETTER X	X
0059	LATIN CAPITAL LETTER Y	Y
005A	LATIN CAPITAL LETTER Z	Z
005A 0300	LATIN CAPITAL LETTER Z WITH COMBINING GRAVE ACCENT	Z̀
005A 0304	LATIN CAPITAL LETTER Z WITH COMBINING MACRON	Z̄
005A 0306	LATIN CAPITAL LETTER Z WITH COMBINING BREVE	Z̆
005A 0308	LATIN CAPITAL LETTER Z WITH COMBINING DIAERESIS	Z̈
005A 0327	LATIN CAPITAL LETTER Z WITH COMBINING CEDILLA	Z̧
0061	LATIN SMALL LETTER A	a
0061 030B	LATIN SMALL LETTER A WITH COMBINING DOUBLE ACUTE ACCENT	a̋
0062	LATIN SMALL LETTER B	b
0063	LATIN SMALL LETTER C	c
0063 0300	LATIN SMALL LETTER C WITH COMBINING GRAVE ACCENT	c̀
0063 0304	LATIN SMALL LETTER C WITH COMBINING MACRON	c̄
0063 0306	LATIN SMALL LETTER C WITH COMBINING BREVE	c̆
0063 0308	LATIN SMALL LETTER C WITH COMBINING DIAERESIS	c̈
0063 0315	LATIN SMALL LETTER C WITH COMBINING COMMA ABOVE RIGHT	c̕
0063 0323	LATIN SMALL LETTER C WITH COMBINING DOT BELOW	c̣
0063 0326	LATIN SMALL LETTER C WITH COMBINING COMMA BELOW	c̦
0063 0328 0306	LATIN SMALL LETTER C WITH COMBINING OGONEK AND COMBINING BREVE	c̨̆
0064	LATIN SMALL LETTER D	d
0064 0302	LATIN SMALL LETTER D WITH COMBINING CIRCUMFLEX ACCENT	d̂
0065	LATIN SMALL LETTER E	e
0066	LATIN SMALL LETTER F	f
0066 0300	LATIN SMALL LETTER F WITH COMBINING GRAVE ACCENT	f̀
0066 0304	LATIN SMALL LETTER F WITH COMBINING MACRON	f̄
0067	LATIN SMALL LETTER G	g
0067 0300	LATIN SMALL LETTER G WITH COMBINING GRAVE ACCENT	g̀
0068	LATIN SMALL LETTER H	h
0068 0304	LATIN SMALL LETTER H WITH COMBINING MACRON	h̄
0068 0326	LATIN SMALL LETTER H WITH COMBINING COMMA BELOW	h̦
0069	LATIN SMALL LETTER I	i
006A	LATIN SMALL LETTER J	j
006A 0301	LATIN SMALL LETTER J WITH COMBINING ACUTE ACCENT	j́
006B	LATIN SMALL LETTER K	k
006B 0300	LATIN SMALL LETTER K WITH COMBINING GRAVE ACCENT	k̀
006B 0302	LATIN SMALL LETTER K WITH COMBINING CIRCUMFLEX ACCENT	k̂
006B 0304	LATIN SMALL LETTER K WITH COMBINING MACRON	k̄
006B 0307	LATIN SMALL LETTER K WITH COMBINING DOT ABOVE	k̇
006B 0315	LATIN SMALL LETTER K WITH COMBINING COMMA ABOVE RIGHT	k̕
006B 031B	LATIN SMALL LETTER K WITH COMBINING HORN	k̛
006B 0326	LATIN SMALL LETTER K WITH COMBINING COMMA BELOW	k̦
006B 035F 0068	LATIN SMALL LETTER K WITH COMBINING DOUBLE MACRON BELOW AND LATIN SMALL LETTER H	k͟h
006C	LATIN SMALL LETTER L	l
006C 0302	LATIN SMALL LETTER L WITH COMBINING CIRCUMFLEX ACCENT	l̂
006C 0325	LATIN SMALL LETTER L WITH COMBINING RING BELOW	l̥
006C 0325 0304	LATIN SMALL LETTER L WITH COMBINING RING BELOW AND COMBINING MACRON	l̥̄
006C 0326	LATIN SMALL LETTER L WITH COMBINING COMMA BELOW	l̦
006D	LATIN SMALL LETTER M	m
006D 0300	LATIN SMALL LETTER M WITH COMBINING GRAVE ACCENT	m̀
006D 0302	LATIN SMALL LETTER M WITH COMBINING CIRCUMFLEX ACCENT	m̂
006D 0306	LATIN SMALL LETTER M WITH COMBINING BREVE	m̆
006D 0310	LATIN SMALL LETTER M WITH COMBINING CANDRABINDU	m̐
006E	LATIN SMALL LETTER N	n
006E 0302	LATIN SMALL LETTER N WITH COMBINING CIRCUMFLEX ACCENT	n̂
006E 0304	LATIN SMALL LETTER N WITH COMBINING MACRON	n̄
006E 0306	LATIN SMALL LETTER N WITH COMBINING BREVE	n̆
006E 0326	LATIN SMALL LETTER N WITH COMBINING COMMA BELOW	n̦
006F	LATIN SMALL LETTER O	o
0070	LATIN SMALL LETTER P	p
0070 0300	LATIN SMALL LETTER P WITH COMBINING GRAVE ACCENT	p̀
0070 0304	LATIN SMALL LETTER P WITH COMBINING MACRON	p̄
0070 0315	LATIN SMALL LETTER P WITH COMBINING COMMA ABOVE RIGHT	p̕
0070 0323	LATIN SMALL LETTER P WITH COMBINING DOT BELOW	p̣
0071	LATIN SMALL LETTER Q	q
0072	LATIN SMALL LETTER R	r
0072 0306	LATIN SMALL LETTER R WITH COMBINING BREVE	r̆
0072 0325	LATIN SMALL LETTER R WITH COMBINING RING BELOW	r̥
0072 0325 0304	LATIN SMALL LETTER R WITH COMBINING RING BELOW AND COMBINING MACRON	r̥̄
0073	LATIN SMALL LETTER S	s
0073 0300	LATIN SMALL LETTER S WITH COMBINING GRAVE ACCENT	s̀
0073 0304	LATIN SMALL LETTER S WITH COMBINING MACRON	s̄
0073 031B 0304	LATIN SMALL LETTER S WITH COMBINING HORN AND COMBINING MACRON	s̛̄
0073 0331	LATIN SMALL LETTER S WITH COMBINING MACRON BELOW	s̱
0074	LATIN SMALL LETTER T	t
0074 0300	LATIN SMALL LETTER T WITH COMBINING GRAVE ACCENT	t̀
0074 0304	LATIN SMALL LETTER T WITH COMBINING MACRON	t̄
0074 0315	LATIN SMALL LETTER T WITH COMBINING COMMA ABOVE RIGHT	t̕
0074 031B	LATIN SMALL LETTER T WITH COMBINING HORN	t̛
0075	LATIN SMALL LETTER U	u
0075 0307	LATIN SMALL LETTER U WITH COMBINING DOT ABOVE	u̇
0076	LATIN SMALL LETTER V	v
0077	LATIN SMALL LETTER W	w
0078	LATIN SMALL LETTER X	x
0079	LATIN SMALL LETTER Y	y
007A	LATIN SMALL LETTER Z	z
007A 0300	LATIN SMALL LETTER Z WITH COMBINING GRAVE ACCENT	z̀
007A 0304	LATIN SMALL LETTER Z WITH COMBINING MACRON	z̄
007A 0306	LATIN SMALL LETTER Z WITH COMBINING BREVE	z̆
007A 0308	LATIN SMALL LETTER Z WITH COMBINING DIAERESIS	z̈
007A 0327	LATIN SMALL LETTER Z WITH COMBINING CEDILLA	z̧
00C0	LATIN CAPITAL LETTER A WITH GRAVE	À
00C1	LATIN CAPITAL LETTER A WITH ACUTE	Á
00C2	LATIN CAPITAL LETTER A WITH CIRCUMFLEX	Â
00C3	LATIN CAPITAL LETTER A WITH TILDE	Ã
00C4	LATIN CAPITAL LETTER A WITH DIAERESIS	Ä
00C5	LATIN CAPITAL LETTER A WITH RING ABOVE	Å
00C6	LATIN CAPITAL LETTER AE	Æ
00C7	LATIN CAPITAL LETTER C WITH CEDILLA	Ç
00C7 0306	LATIN CAPITAL LETTER C WITH CEDILLA WITH COMBINING BREVE	Ç̆
00C8	LATIN CAPITAL LETTER E WITH GRAVE	È
00C9	LATIN CAPITAL LETTER E WITH ACUTE	É
00CA	LATIN CAPITAL LETTER E WITH CIRCUMFLEX	Ê
00CB	LATIN CAPITAL LETTER E WITH DIAERESIS	Ë
00CC	LATIN CAPITAL LETTER I WITH GRAVE	Ì
00CD	LATIN CAPITAL LETTER I WITH ACUTE	Í
00CE	LATIN CAPITAL LETTER I WITH CIRCUMFLEX	Î
00CF	LATIN CAPITAL LETTER I WITH DIAERESIS	Ï
00D0	LATIN CAPITAL LETTER ETH	Ð
00D1	LATIN CAPITAL LETTER N WITH TILDE	Ñ
00D2	LATIN CAPITAL LETTER O WITH GRAVE	Ò
00D3	LATIN CAPITAL LETTER O WITH ACUTE	Ó
00D4	LATIN CAPITAL LETTER O WITH CIRCUMFLEX	Ô
00D5	LATIN CAPITAL LETTER O WITH TILDE	Õ
00D6	LATIN CAPITAL LETTER O WITH DIAERESIS	Ö
00D8	LATIN CAPITAL LETTER O WITH STROKE	Ø
00D9	LATIN CAPITAL LETTER U WITH GRAVE	Ù
00DA	LATIN CAPITAL LETTER U WITH ACUTE	Ú
00DB	LATIN CAPITAL LETTER U WITH CIRCUMFLEX	Û
00DB 0304	LATIN CAPITAL LETTER U WITH CIRCUMFLEX WITH COMBINING MACRON	Û̄
00DC	LATIN CAPITAL LETTER U WITH DIAERESIS	Ü
00DD	LATIN CAPITAL LETTER Y WITH ACUTE	Ý
00DE	LATIN CAPITAL LETTER THORN	Þ
00DF	LATIN SMALL LETTER SHARP S	ß
00E0	LATIN SMALL LETTER A WITH GRAVE	à
00E1	LATIN SMALL LETTER A WITH ACUTE	á
00E2	LATIN SMALL LETTER A WITH CIRCUMFLEX	â
00E3	LATIN SMALL LETTER A WITH TILDE	ã
00E4	LATIN SMALL LETTER A WITH DIAERESIS	ä
00E5	LATIN SMALL LETTER A WITH RING ABOVE	å
00E6	LATIN SMALL LETTER AE	æ
00E7	LATIN SMALL LETTER C WITH CEDILLA	ç
00E7 0306	LATIN SMALL LETTER C WITH CEDILLA WITH COMBINING BREVE	ç̆
00E8	LATIN SMALL LETTER E WITH GRAVE	è
00E9	LATIN SMALL LETTER E WITH ACUTE	é
00EA	LATIN SMALL LETTER E WITH CIRCUMFLEX	ê
00EB	LATIN SMALL LETTER E WITH DIAERESIS	ë
00EC	LATIN SMALL LETTER I WITH GRAVE	ì
00ED	LATIN SMALL LETTER I WITH ACUTE	í
00EE	LATIN SMALL LETTER I WITH CIRCUMFLEX	î
00EF	LATIN SMALL LETTER I WITH DIAERESIS	ï
00F0	LATIN SMALL LETTER ETH	ð
00F1	LATIN SMALL LETTER N WITH TILDE	ñ
00F2	LATIN SMALL LETTER O WITH GRAVE	ò
00F3	LATIN SMALL LETTER O WITH ACUTE	ó
00F4	LATIN SMALL LETTER O WITH CIRCUMFLEX	ô
00F5	LATIN SMALL LETTER O WITH TILDE	õ
00F6	LATIN SMALL LETTER O WITH DIAERESIS	ö
00F8	LATIN SMALL LETTER O WITH STROKE	ø
00F9	LATIN SMALL LETTER U WITH GRAVE	ù
00FA	LATIN SMALL LETTER U WITH ACUTE	ú
00FB	LATIN SMALL LETTER U WITH CIRCUMFLEX	û
00FB 0304	LATIN SMALL LETTER U WITH CIRCUMFLEX WITH COMBINING MACRON	û̄
00FC	LATIN SMALL LETTER U WITH DIAERESIS	ü
00FD	LATIN SMALL LETTER Y WITH ACUTE	ý
00FE	LATIN SMALL LETTER THORN	þ
00FF	LATIN SMALL LETTER Y WITH DIAERESIS	ÿ
00FF 0301	LATIN SMALL LETTER Y WITH DIAERESIS WITH COMBINING ACUTE ACCENT	ÿ́
0100	LATIN CAPITAL LETTER A WITH MACRON	Ā
0101	LATIN SMALL LETTER A WITH MACRON	ā
0102	LATIN CAPITAL LETTER A WITH BREVE	Ă
0103	LATIN SMALL LETTER A WITH BREVE	ă
0104	LATIN CAPITAL LETTER A WITH OGONEK	Ą
0105	LATIN SMALL LETTER A WITH OGONEK	ą
0106	LATIN CAPITAL LETTER C WITH ACUTE	Ć
0107	LATIN SMALL LETTER C WITH ACUTE	ć
0108	LATIN CAPITAL LETTER C WITH CIRCUMFLEX	Ĉ
0109	LATIN SMALL LETTER C WITH CIRCUMFLEX	ĉ
010A	LATIN CAPITAL LETTER C WITH DOT ABOVE	Ċ
010B	LATIN SMALL LETTER C WITH DOT ABOVE	ċ
010C	LATIN CAPITAL LETTER C WITH CARON	Č
010C 0315	LATIN CAPITAL LETTER C WITH CARON WITH COMBINING COMMA ABOVE RIGHT	Č̕
010C 0323	LATIN CAPITAL LETTER C WITH CARON WITH COMBINING DOT BELOW	Č̣
010D	LATIN SMALL LETTER C WITH CARON	č
010D 0315	LATIN SMALL LETTER C WITH CARON WITH COMBINING COMMA ABOVE RIGHT	č̕
010D 0323	LATIN SMALL LETTER C WITH CARON WITH COMBINING DOT BELOW	č̣
010E	LATIN CAPITAL LETTER D WITH CARON	Ď
010F	LATIN SMALL LETTER D WITH CARON	ď
0110	LATIN CAPITAL LETTER D WITH STROKE	Đ
0111	LATIN SMALL LETTER D WITH STROKE	đ
0112	LATIN CAPITAL LETTER E WITH MACRON	Ē
0113	LATIN SMALL LETTER E WITH MACRON	ē
0113 030D	LATIN SMALL LETTER E WITH MACRON WITH COMBINING VERTICAL LINE ABOVE	ē̍
0114	LATIN CAPITAL LETTER E WITH BREVE	Ĕ
0115	LATIN SMALL LETTER E WITH BREVE	ĕ
0116	LATIN CAPITAL LETTER E WITH DOT ABOVE	Ė
0117	LATIN SMALL LETTER E WITH DOT ABOVE	ė
0118	LATIN CAPITAL LETTER E WITH OGONEK	Ę
0119	LATIN SMALL LETTER E WITH OGONEK	ę
011A	LATIN CAPITAL LETTER E WITH CARON	Ě
011B	LATIN SMALL LETTER E WITH CARON	ě
011C	LATIN CAPITAL LETTER G WITH CIRCUMFLEX	Ĝ
011D	LATIN SMALL LETTER G WITH CIRCUMFLEX	ĝ
011E	LATIN CAPITAL LETTER G WITH BREVE	Ğ
011F	LATIN SMALL LETTER G WITH BREVE	ğ
0120	LATIN CAPITAL LETTER G WITH DOT ABOVE	Ġ
0121	LATIN SMALL LETTER G WITH DOT ABOVE	ġ
0122	LATIN CAPITAL LETTER G WITH CEDILLA	Ģ
0123	LATIN SMALL LETTER G WITH CEDILLA	ģ
0124	LATIN CAPITAL LETTER H WITH CIRCUMFLEX	Ĥ
0125	LATIN SMALL LETTER H WITH CIRCUMFLEX	ĥ
0126	LATIN CAPITAL LETTER H WITH STROKE	Ħ
0127	LATIN SMALL LETTER H WITH STROKE	ħ
0128	LATIN CAPITAL LETTER I WITH TILDE	Ĩ
0129	LATIN SMALL LETTER I WITH TILDE	ĩ
012A	LATIN CAPITAL LETTER I WITH MACRON	Ī
012A 0301	LATIN CAPITAL LETTER I WITH MACRON WITH COMBINING ACUTE ACCENT	Ī́
012B	LATIN SMALL LETTER I WITH MACRON	ī
012B 0301	LATIN SMALL LETTER I WITH MACRON WITH COMBINING ACUTE ACCENT	ī́
012C	LATIN CAPITAL LETTER I WITH BREVE	Ĭ
012D	LATIN SMALL LETTER I WITH BREVE	ĭ
012E	LATIN CAPITAL LETTER I WITH OGONEK	Į
012F	LATIN SMALL LETTER I WITH OGONEK	į
0130	LATIN CAPITAL LETTER I WITH DOT ABOVE	İ
0131	LATIN SMALL LETTER DOTLESS I	ı
0132	LATIN CAPITAL LIGATURE IJ	Ĳ
0133	LATIN SMALL LIGATURE IJ	ĳ
0134	LATIN CAPITAL LETTER J WITH CIRCUMFLEX	Ĵ
0135	LATIN SMALL LETTER J WITH CIRCUMFLEX	ĵ
0136	LATIN CAPITAL LETTER K WITH CEDILLA	Ķ
0137	LATIN SMALL LETTER K WITH CEDILLA	ķ
0138	LATIN SMALL LETTER KRA	ĸ
0139	LATIN CAPITAL LETTER L WITH ACUTE	Ĺ
013A	LATIN SMALL LETTER L WITH ACUTE	ĺ
013B	LATIN CAPITAL LETTER L WITH CEDILLA	Ļ
013C	LATIN SMALL LETTER L WITH CEDILLA	ļ
013D	LATIN CAPITAL LETTER L WITH CARON	Ľ
013E	LATIN SMALL LETTER L WITH CARON	ľ
013F	LATIN CAPITAL LETTER L WITH MIDDLE DOT	Ŀ
0140	LATIN SMALL LETTER L WITH MIDDLE DOT	ŀ
0141	LATIN CAPITAL LETTER L WITH STROKE	Ł
0142	LATIN SMALL LETTER L WITH STROKE	ł
0143	LATIN CAPITAL LETTER N WITH ACUTE	Ń
0144	LATIN SMALL LETTER N WITH ACUTE	ń
0145	LATIN CAPITAL LETTER N WITH CEDILLA	Ņ
0146	LATIN SMALL LETTER N WITH CEDILLA	ņ
0147	LATIN CAPITAL LETTER N WITH CARON	Ň
0148	LATIN SMALL LETTER N WITH CARON	ň
0149	LATIN SMALL LETTER N PRECEDED BY APOSTROPHE	ŉ
014A	LATIN CAPITAL LETTER ENG	Ŋ
014B	LATIN SMALL LETTER ENG	ŋ
014C	LATIN CAPITAL LETTER O WITH MACRON	Ō
014D	LATIN SMALL LETTER O WITH MACRON	ō
014D 030D	LATIN SMALL LETTER O WITH MACRON WITH COMBINING VERTICAL LINE ABOVE	ō̍
014E	LATIN CAPITAL LETTER O WITH BREVE	Ŏ
014F	LATIN SMALL LETTER O WITH BREVE	ŏ
0150	LATIN CAPITAL LETTER O WITH DOUBLE ACUTE	Ő
0151	LATIN SMALL LETTER O WITH DOUBLE ACUTE	ő
0152	LATIN CAPITAL LIGATURE OE	Œ
0153	LATIN SMALL LIGATURE OE	œ
0154	LATIN CAPITAL LETTER R WITH ACUTE	Ŕ
0155	LATIN SMALL LETTER R WITH ACUTE	ŕ
0156	LATIN CAPITAL LETTER R WITH CEDILLA	Ŗ
0157	LATIN SMALL LETTER R WITH CEDILLA	ŗ
0158	LATIN CAPITAL LETTER R WITH CARON	Ř
0159	LATIN SMALL LETTER R WITH CARON	ř
015A	LATIN CAPITAL LETTER S WITH ACUTE	Ś
015B	LATIN SMALL LETTER S WITH ACUTE	ś
015C	LATIN CAPITAL LETTER S WITH CIRCUMFLEX	Ŝ
015D	LATIN SMALL LETTER S WITH CIRCUMFLEX	ŝ
015E	LATIN CAPITAL LETTER S WITH CEDILLA	Ş
015F	LATIN SMALL LETTER S WITH CEDILLA	ş
0160	LATIN CAPITAL LETTER S WITH CARON	Š
0161	LATIN SMALL LETTER S WITH CARON	š
0162	LATIN CAPITAL LETTER T WITH CEDILLA	Ţ
0163	LATIN SMALL LETTER T WITH CEDILLA	ţ
0164	LATIN CAPITAL LETTER T WITH CARON	Ť
0165	LATIN SMALL LETTER T WITH CARON	ť
0166	LATIN CAPITAL LETTER T WITH STROKE	Ŧ
0167	LATIN SMALL LETTER T WITH STROKE	ŧ
0168	LATIN CAPITAL LETTER U WITH TILDE	Ũ
0169	LATIN SMALL LETTER U WITH TILDE	ũ
016A	LATIN CAPITAL LETTER U WITH MACRON	Ū
016B	LATIN SMALL LETTER U WITH MACRON	ū
016C	LATIN CAPITAL LETTER U WITH BREVE	Ŭ
016D	LATIN SMALL LETTER U WITH BREVE	ŭ
016E	LATIN CAPITAL LETTER U WITH RING ABOVE	Ů
016F	LATIN SMALL LETTER U WITH RING ABOVE	ů
0170	LATIN CAPITAL LETTER U WITH DOUBLE ACUTE	Ű
0171	LATIN SMALL LETTER U WITH DOUBLE ACUTE	ű
0172	LATIN CAPITAL LETTER U WITH OGONEK	Ų
0173	LATIN SMALL LETTER U WITH OGONEK	ų
0174	LATIN CAPITAL LETTER W WITH CIRCUMFLEX	Ŵ
0175	LATIN SMALL LETTER W WITH CIRCUMFLEX	ŵ
0176	LATIN CAPITAL LETTER Y WITH CIRCUMFLEX	Ŷ
0177	LATIN SMALL LETTER Y WITH CIRCUMFLEX	ŷ
0178	LATIN CAPITAL LETTER Y WITH DIAERESIS	Ÿ
0179	LATIN CAPITAL LETTER Z WITH ACUTE	Ź
017A	LATIN SMALL LETTER Z WITH ACUTE	ź
017B	LATIN CAPITAL LETTER Z WITH DOT ABOVE	Ż
017C	LATIN SMALL LETTER Z WITH DOT ABOVE	ż
017D	LATIN CAPITAL LETTER Z WITH CARON	Ž
017D 0326	LATIN CAPITAL LETTER Z WITH CARON WITH COMBINING COMMA BELOW	Ž̦
017D 0327	LATIN CAPITAL LETTER Z WITH CARON WITH COMBINING CEDILLA	Ž̧
017E	LATIN SMALL LETTER Z WITH CARON	ž
017E 0326	LATIN SMALL LETTER Z WITH CARON WITH COMBINING COMMA BELOW	ž̦
017E 0327	LATIN SMALL LETTER Z WITH CARON WITH COMBINING CEDILLA	ž̧
0187	LATIN CAPITAL LETTER C WITH HOOK	Ƈ
0188	LATIN SMALL LETTER C WITH HOOK	ƈ
018F	LATIN CAPITAL LETTER SCHWA	Ə
0197	LATIN CAPITAL LETTER I WITH STROKE	Ɨ
01A0	LATIN CAPITAL LETTER O WITH HORN	Ơ
01A1	LATIN SMALL LETTER O WITH HORN	ơ
01AF	LATIN CAPITAL LETTER U WITH HORN	Ư
01B0	LATIN SMALL LETTER U WITH HORN	ư
01B7	LATIN CAPITAL LETTER EZH	Ʒ
01CD	LATIN CAPITAL LETTER A WITH CARON	Ǎ
01CE	LATIN SMALL LETTER A WITH CARON	ǎ
01CF	LATIN CAPITAL LETTER I WITH CARON	Ǐ
01D0	LATIN SMALL LETTER I WITH CARON	ǐ
01D1	LATIN CAPITAL LETTER O WITH CARON	Ǒ
01D2	LATIN SMALL LETTER O WITH CARON	ǒ
01D3	LATIN CAPITAL LETTER U WITH CARON	Ǔ
01D4	LATIN SMALL LETTER U WITH CARON	ǔ
01D5	LATIN CAPITAL LETTER U WITH DIAERESIS AND MACRON	Ǖ
01D6	LATIN SMALL LETTER U WITH DIAERESIS AND MACRON	ǖ
01D7	LATIN CAPITAL LETTER U WITH DIAERESIS AND ACUTE	Ǘ
01D8	LATIN SMALL LETTER U WITH DIAERESIS AND ACUTE	ǘ
01D9	LATIN CAPITAL LETTER U WITH DIAERESIS AND CARON	Ǚ
01DA	LATIN SMALL LETTER U WITH DIAERESIS AND CARON	ǚ
01DB	LATIN CAPITAL LETTER U WITH DIAERESIS AND GRAVE	Ǜ
01DC	LATIN SMALL LETTER U WITH DIAERESIS AND GRAVE	ǜ
01DE	LATIN CAPITAL LETTER A WITH DIAERESIS AND MACRON	Ǟ
01DF	LATIN SMALL LETTER A WITH DIAERESIS AND MACRON	ǟ
01E2	LATIN CAPITAL LETTER AE WITH MACRON	Ǣ
01E3	LATIN SMALL LETTER AE WITH MACRON	ǣ
01E4	LATIN CAPITAL LETTER G WITH STROKE	Ǥ
01E5	LATIN SMALL LETTER G WITH STROKE	ǥ
01E6	LATIN CAPITAL LETTER G WITH CARON	Ǧ
01E7	LATIN SMALL LETTER G WITH CARON	ǧ
01E8	LATIN CAPITAL LETTER K WITH CARON	Ǩ
01E9	LATIN SMALL LETTER K WITH CARON	ǩ
01EA	LATIN CAPITAL LETTER O WITH OGONEK	Ǫ
01EB	LATIN SMALL LETTER O WITH OGONEK	ǫ
01EC	LATIN CAPITAL LETTER O WITH OGONEK AND MACRON	Ǭ
01ED	LATIN SMALL LETTER O WITH OGONEK AND MACRON	ǭ
01EE	LATIN CAPITAL LETTER EZH WITH CARON	Ǯ
01EF	LATIN SMALL LETTER EZH WITH CARON	ǯ
01F0	LATIN SMALL LETTER J WITH CARON	ǰ
01F4	LATIN CAPITAL LETTER G WITH ACUTE	Ǵ
01F5	LATIN SMALL LETTER G WITH ACUTE	ǵ
01F8	LATIN CAPITAL LETTER N WITH GRAVE	Ǹ
01F9	LATIN SMALL LETTER N WITH GRAVE	ǹ
01FA	LATIN CAPITAL LETTER A WITH RING ABOVE AND ACUTE	Ǻ
01FB	LATIN SMALL LETTER A WITH RING ABOVE AND ACUTE	ǻ
01FC	LATIN CAPITAL LETTER AE WITH ACUTE	Ǽ
01FD	LATIN SMALL LETTER AE WITH ACUTE	ǽ
01FE	LATIN CAPITAL LETTER O WITH STROKE AND ACUTE	Ǿ
01FF	LATIN SMALL LETTER O WITH STROKE AND ACUTE	ǿ
0212	LATIN CAPITAL LETTER R WITH INVERTED BREVE	Ȓ
0213	LATIN SMALL LETTER R WITH INVERTED BREVE	ȓ
0218	LATIN CAPITAL LETTER S WITH COMMA BELOW	Ș
0219	LATIN SMALL LETTER S WITH COMMA BELOW	ș
021A	LATIN CAPITAL LETTER T WITH COMMA BELOW	Ț
021B	LATIN SMALL LETTER T WITH COMMA BELOW	ț
021E	LATIN CAPITAL LETTER H WITH CARON	Ȟ
021F	LATIN SMALL LETTER H WITH CARON	ȟ
0227	LATIN SMALL LETTER A WITH DOT ABOVE	ȧ
0228	LATIN CAPITAL LETTER E WITH CEDILLA	Ȩ
0229	LATIN SMALL LETTER E WITH CEDILLA	ȩ
022A	LATIN CAPITAL LETTER O WITH DIAERESIS AND MACRON	Ȫ
022B	LATIN SMALL LETTER O WITH DIAERESIS AND MACRON	ȫ
022C	LATIN CAPITAL LETTER O WITH TILDE AND MACRON	Ȭ
022D	LATIN SMALL LETTER O WITH TILDE AND MACRON	ȭ
022E	LATIN CAPITAL LETTER O WITH DOT ABOVE	Ȯ
022F	LATIN SMALL LETTER O WITH DOT ABOVE	ȯ
0230	LATIN CAPITAL LETTER O WITH DOT ABOVE AND MACRON	Ȱ
0231	LATIN SMALL LETTER O WITH DOT ABOVE AND MACRON	ȱ
0232	LATIN CAPITAL LETTER Y WITH MACRON	Ȳ
0233	LATIN SMALL LETTER Y WITH MACRON	ȳ
0259	LATIN SMALL LETTER SCHWA	ə
0268	LATIN SMALL LETTER I WITH STROKE	ɨ
0292	LATIN SMALL LETTER EZH	ʒ
1E02	LATIN CAPITAL LETTER B WITH DOT ABOVE	Ḃ
1E03	LATIN SMALL LETTER B WITH DOT ABOVE	ḃ
1E06	LATIN CAPITAL LETTER B WITH LINE BELOW	Ḇ
1E07	LATIN SMALL LETTER B WITH LINE BELOW	ḇ
1E0A	LATIN CAPITAL LETTER D WITH DOT ABOVE	Ḋ
1E0B	LATIN SMALL LETTER D WITH DOT ABOVE	ḋ
1E0C	LATIN CAPITAL LETTER D WITH DOT BELOW	Ḍ
1E0D	LATIN SMALL LETTER D WITH DOT BELOW	ḍ
1E0E	LATIN CAPITAL LETTER D WITH LINE BELOW	Ḏ
1E0F	LATIN SMALL LETTER D WITH LINE BELOW	ḏ
1E10	LATIN CAPITAL LETTER D WITH CEDILLA	Ḑ
1E11	LATIN SMALL LETTER D WITH CEDILLA	ḑ
1E17	LATIN SMALL LETTER E WITH MACRON AND ACUTE	ḗ
1E1C	LATIN CAPITAL LETTER E WITH CEDILLA AND BREVE	Ḝ
1E1D	LATIN SMALL LETTER E WITH CEDILLA AND BREVE	ḝ
1E1E	LATIN CAPITAL LETTER F WITH DOT ABOVE	Ḟ
1E1F	LATIN SMALL LETTER F WITH DOT ABOVE	ḟ
1E20	LATIN CAPITAL LETTER G WITH MACRON	Ḡ
1E21	LATIN SMALL LETTER G WITH MACRON	ḡ
1E22	LATIN CAPITAL LETTER H WITH DOT ABOVE	Ḣ
1E23	LATIN SMALL LETTER H WITH DOT ABOVE	ḣ
1E24	LATIN CAPITAL LETTER H WITH DOT BELOW	Ḥ
1E25	LATIN SMALL LETTER H WITH DOT BELOW	ḥ
1E26	LATIN CAPITAL LETTER H WITH DIAERESIS	Ḧ
1E27	LATIN SMALL LETTER H WITH DIAERESIS	ḧ
1E28	LATIN CAPITAL LETTER H WITH CEDILLA	Ḩ
1E29	LATIN SMALL LETTER H WITH CEDILLA	ḩ
1E2A	LATIN CAPITAL LETTER H WITH BREVE BELOW	Ḫ
1E2B	LATIN SMALL LETTER H WITH BREVE BELOW	ḫ
1E2F	LATIN SMALL LETTER I WITH DIAERESIS AND ACUTE	ḯ
1E30	LATIN CAPITAL LETTER K WITH ACUTE	Ḱ
1E31	LATIN SMALL LETTER K WITH ACUTE	ḱ
1E32	LATIN CAPITAL LETTER K WITH DOT BELOW	Ḳ
1E32 0304	LATIN CAPITAL LETTER K WITH DOT BELOW WITH COMBINING MACRON	Ḳ̄
1E33	LATIN SMALL LETTER K WITH DOT BELOW	ḳ
1E33 0304	LATIN SMALL LETTER K WITH DOT BELOW WITH COMBINING MACRON	ḳ̄
1E34	LATIN CAPITAL LETTER K WITH LINE BELOW	Ḵ
1E35	LATIN SMALL LETTER K WITH LINE BELOW	ḵ
1E36	LATIN CAPITAL LETTER L WITH DOT BELOW	Ḷ
1E37	LATIN SMALL LETTER L WITH DOT BELOW	ḷ
1E3A	LATIN CAPITAL LETTER L WITH LINE BELOW	Ḻ
1E3B	LATIN SMALL LETTER L WITH LINE BELOW	ḻ
1E40	LATIN CAPITAL LETTER M WITH DOT ABOVE	Ṁ
1E41	LATIN SMALL LETTER M WITH DOT ABOVE	ṁ
1E42	LATIN CAPITAL LETTER M WITH DOT BELOW	Ṃ
1E43	LATIN SMALL LETTER M WITH DOT BELOW	ṃ
1E44	LATIN CAPITAL LETTER N WITH DOT ABOVE	Ṅ
1E45	LATIN SMALL LETTER N WITH DOT ABOVE	ṅ
1E46	LATIN CAPITAL LETTER N WITH DOT BELOW	Ṇ
1E47	LATIN SMALL LETTER N WITH DOT BELOW	ṇ
1E48	LATIN CAPITAL LETTER N WITH LINE BELOW	Ṉ
1E49	LATIN SMALL LETTER N WITH LINE BELOW	ṉ
1E52	LATIN CAPITAL LETTER O WITH MACRON AND ACUTE	Ṓ
1E53	LATIN SMALL LETTER O WITH MACRON AND ACUTE	ṓ
1E54	LATIN CAPITAL LETTER P WITH ACUTE	Ṕ
1E55	LATIN SMALL LETTER P WITH ACUTE	ṕ
1E56	LATIN CAPITAL LETTER P WITH DOT ABOVE	Ṗ
1E57	LATIN SMALL LETTER P WITH DOT ABOVE	ṗ
1E58	LATIN CAPITAL LETTER R WITH DOT ABOVE	Ṙ
1E59	LATIN SMALL LETTER R WITH DOT ABOVE	ṙ
1E5A	LATIN CAPITAL LETTER R WITH DOT BELOW	Ṛ
1E5B	LATIN SMALL LETTER R WITH DOT BELOW	ṛ
1E5E	LATIN CAPITAL LETTER R WITH LINE BELOW	Ṟ
1E5F	LATIN SMALL LETTER R WITH LINE BELOW	ṟ
1E60	LATIN CAPITAL LETTER S WITH DOT ABOVE	Ṡ
1E61	LATIN SMALL LETTER S WITH DOT ABOVE	ṡ
1E62	LATIN CAPITAL LETTER S WITH DOT BELOW	Ṣ
1E62 0304	LATIN CAPITAL LETTER S WITH DOT BELOW WITH COMBINING MACRON	Ṣ̄
1E63	LATIN SMALL LETTER S WITH DOT BELOW	ṣ
1E63 0304	LATIN SMALL LETTER S WITH DOT BELOW WITH COMBINING MACRON	ṣ̄
1E6A	LATIN CAPITAL LETTER T WITH DOT ABOVE	Ṫ
1E6B	LATIN SMALL LETTER T WITH DOT ABOVE	ṫ
1E6C	LATIN CAPITAL LETTER T WITH DOT BELOW	Ṭ
1E6C 0304	LATIN CAPITAL LETTER T WITH DOT BELOW WITH COMBINING MACRON	Ṭ̄
1E6D	LATIN SMALL LETTER T WITH DOT BELOW	ṭ
1E6D 0304	LATIN SMALL LETTER T WITH DOT BELOW WITH COMBINING MACRON	ṭ̄
1E6E	LATIN CAPITAL LETTER T WITH LINE BELOW	Ṯ
1E6F	LATIN SMALL LETTER T WITH LINE BELOW	ṯ
1E80	LATIN CAPITAL LETTER W WITH GRAVE	Ẁ
1E81	LATIN SMALL LETTER W WITH GRAVE	ẁ
1E82	LATIN CAPITAL LETTER W WITH ACUTE	Ẃ
1E83	LATIN SMALL LETTER W WITH ACUTE	ẃ
1E84	LATIN CAPITAL LETTER W WITH DIAERESIS	Ẅ
1E85	LATIN SMALL LETTER W WITH DIAERESIS	ẅ
1E86	LATIN CAPITAL LETTER W WITH DOT ABOVE	Ẇ
1E87	LATIN SMALL LETTER W WITH DOT ABOVE	ẇ
1E8C	LATIN CAPITAL LETTER X WITH DIAERESIS	Ẍ
1E8D	LATIN SMALL LETTER X WITH DIAERESIS	ẍ
1E8E	LATIN CAPITAL LETTER Y WITH DOT ABOVE	Ẏ
1E8F	LATIN SMALL LETTER Y WITH DOT ABOVE	ẏ
1E90	LATIN CAPITAL LETTER Z WITH CIRCUMFLEX	Ẑ
1E91	LATIN SMALL LETTER Z WITH CIRCUMFLEX	ẑ
1E92	LATIN CAPITAL LETTER Z WITH DOT BELOW	Ẓ
1E93	LATIN SMALL LETTER Z WITH DOT BELOW	ẓ
1E94	LATIN CAPITAL LETTER Z WITH LINE BELOW	Ẕ
1E95	LATIN SMALL LETTER Z WITH LINE BELOW	ẕ
1E96	LATIN SMALL LETTER H WITH LINE BELOW	ẖ
1E97	LATIN SMALL LETTER T WITH DIAERESIS	ẗ
1E9E	LATIN CAPITAL LETTER SHARP S	ẞ
1EA0	LATIN CAPITAL LETTER A WITH DOT BELOW	Ạ
1EA0 0308	LATIN CAPITAL LETTER A WITH DOT BELOW WITH COMBINING DIAERESIS	Ạ̈
1EA1	LATIN SMALL LETTER A WITH DOT BELOW	ạ
1EA1 0308	LATIN SMALL LETTER A WITH DOT BELOW WITH COMBINING DIAERESIS	ạ̈
1EA2	LATIN CAPITAL LETTER A WITH HOOK ABOVE	Ả
1EA3	LATIN SMALL LETTER A WITH HOOK ABOVE	ả
1EA4	LATIN CAPITAL LETTER A WITH CIRCUMFLEX AND ACUTE	Ấ
1EA5	LATIN SMALL LETTER A WITH CIRCUMFLEX AND ACUTE	ấ
1EA6	LATIN CAPITAL LETTER A WITH CIRCUMFLEX AND GRAVE	Ầ
1EA7	LATIN SMALL LETTER A WITH CIRCUMFLEX AND GRAVE	ầ
1EA8	LATIN CAPITAL LETTER A WITH CIRCUMFLEX AND HOOK ABOVE	Ẩ
1EA9	LATIN SMALL LETTER A WITH CIRCUMFLEX AND HOOK ABOVE	ẩ
1EAA	LATIN CAPITAL LETTER A WITH CIRCUMFLEX AND TILDE	Ẫ
1EAB	LATIN SMALL LETTER A WITH CIRCUMFLEX AND TILDE	ẫ
1EAC	LATIN CAPITAL LETTER A WITH CIRCUMFLEX AND DOT BELOW	Ậ
1EAD	LATIN SMALL LETTER A WITH CIRCUMFLEX AND DOT BELOW	ậ
1EAE	LATIN CAPITAL LETTER A WITH BREVE AND ACUTE	Ắ
1EAF	LATIN SMALL LETTER A WITH BREVE AND ACUTE	ắ
1EB0	LATIN CAPITAL LETTER A WITH BREVE AND GRAVE	Ằ
1EB1	LATIN SMALL LETTER A WITH BREVE AND GRAVE	ằ
1EB2	LATIN CAPITAL LETTER A WITH BREVE AND HOOK ABOVE	Ẳ
1EB3	LATIN SMALL LETTER A WITH BREVE AND HOOK ABOVE	ẳ
1EB4	LATIN CAPITAL LETTER A WITH BREVE AND TILDE	Ẵ
1EB5	LATIN SMALL LETTER A WITH BREVE AND TILDE	ẵ
1EB6	LATIN CAPITAL LETTER A WITH BREVE AND DOT BELOW	Ặ
1EB7	LATIN SMALL LETTER A WITH BREVE AND DOT BELOW	ặ
1EB8	LATIN CAPITAL LETTER E WITH DOT BELOW	Ẹ
1EB9	LATIN SMALL LETTER E WITH DOT BELOW	ẹ
1EBA	LATIN CAPITAL LETTER E WITH HOOK ABOVE	Ẻ
1EBB	LATIN SMALL LETTER E WITH HOOK ABOVE	ẻ
1EBC	LATIN CAPITAL LETTER E WITH TILDE	Ẽ
1EBD	LATIN SMALL LETTER E WITH TILDE	ẽ
1EBE	LATIN CAPITAL LETTER E WITH CIRCUMFLEX AND ACUTE	Ế
1EBF	LATIN SMALL LETTER E WITH CIRCUMFLEX AND ACUTE	ế
1EC0	LATIN CAPITAL LETTER E WITH CIRCUMFLEX AND GRAVE	Ề
1EC1	LATIN SMALL LETTER E WITH CIRCUMFLEX AND GRAVE	ề
1EC2	LATIN CAPITAL LETTER E WITH CIRCUMFLEX AND HOOK ABOVE	Ể
1EC3	LATIN SMALL LETTER E WITH CIRCUMFLEX AND HOOK ABOVE	ể
1EC4	LATIN CAPITAL LETTER E WITH CIRCUMFLEX AND TILDE	Ễ
1EC5	LATIN SMALL LETTER E WITH CIRCUMFLEX AND TILDE	ễ
1EC6	LATIN CAPITAL LETTER E WITH CIRCUMFLEX AND DOT BELOW	Ệ
1EC7	LATIN SMALL LETTER E WITH CIRCUMFLEX AND DOT BELOW	ệ
1EC8	LATIN CAPITAL LETTER I WITH HOOK ABOVE	Ỉ
1EC9	LATIN SMALL LETTER I WITH HOOK ABOVE	ỉ
1ECA	LATIN CAPITAL LETTER I WITH DOT BELOW	Ị
1ECB	LATIN SMALL LETTER I WITH DOT BELOW	ị
1ECC	LATIN CAPITAL LETTER O WITH DOT BELOW	Ọ
1ECC 0308	LATIN CAPITAL LETTER O WITH DOT BELOW WITH COMBINING DIAERESIS	Ọ̈
1ECD	LATIN SMALL LETTER O WITH DOT BELOW	ọ
1ECD 0308	LATIN SMALL LETTER O WITH DOT BELOW WITH COMBINING DIAERESIS	ọ̈
1ECE	LATIN CAPITAL LETTER O WITH HOOK ABOVE	Ỏ
1ECF	LATIN SMALL LETTER O WITH HOOK ABOVE	ỏ
1ED0	LATIN CAPITAL LETTER O WITH CIRCUMFLEX AND ACUTE	Ố
1ED1	LATIN SMALL LETTER O WITH CIRCUMFLEX AND ACUTE	ố
1ED2	LATIN CAPITAL LETTER O WITH CIRCUMFLEX AND GRAVE	Ồ
1ED3	LATIN SMALL LETTER O WITH CIRCUMFLEX AND GRAVE	ồ
1ED4	LATIN CAPITAL LETTER O WITH CIRCUMFLEX AND HOOK ABOVE	Ổ
1ED5	LATIN SMALL LETTER O WITH CIRCUMFLEX AND HOOK ABOVE	ổ
1ED6	LATIN CAPITAL LETTER O WITH CIRCUMFLEX AND TILDE	Ỗ
1ED7	LATIN SMALL LETTER O WITH CIRCUMFLEX AND TILDE	ỗ
1ED8	LATIN CAPITAL LETTER O WITH CIRCUMFLEX AND DOT BELOW	Ộ
1ED9	LATIN SMALL LETTER O WITH CIRCUMFLEX AND DOT BELOW	ộ
1EDA	LATIN CAPITAL LETTER O WITH HORN AND ACUTE	Ớ
1EDB	LATIN SMALL LETTER O WITH HORN AND ACUTE	ớ
1EDC	LATIN CAPITAL LETTER O WITH HORN AND GRAVE	Ờ
1EDD	LATIN SMALL LETTER O WITH HORN AND GRAVE	ờ
1EDE	LATIN CAPITAL LETTER O WITH HORN AND HOOK ABOVE	Ở
1EDF	LATIN SMALL LETTER O WITH HORN AND HOOK ABOVE	ở
1EE0	LATIN CAPITAL LETTER O WITH HORN AND TILDE	Ỡ
1EE1	LATIN SMALL LETTER O WITH HORN AND TILDE	ỡ
1EE2	LATIN CAPITAL LETTER O WITH HORN AND DOT BELOW	Ợ
1EE3	LATIN SMALL LETTER O WITH HORN AND DOT BELOW	ợ
1EE4	LATIN CAPITAL LETTER U WITH DOT BELOW	Ụ
1EE4 0304	LATIN CAPITAL LETTER U WITH DOT BELOW WITH COMBINING MACRON	Ụ̄
1EE4 0308	LATIN CAPITAL LETTER U WITH DOT BELOW WITH COMBINING DIAERESIS	Ụ̈
1EE5	LATIN SMALL LETTER U WITH DOT BELOW	ụ
1EE5 0304	LATIN SMALL LETTER U WITH DOT BELOW WITH COMBINING MACRON	ụ̄
1EE5 0308	LATIN SMALL LETTER U WITH DOT BELOW WITH COMBINING DIAERESIS	ụ̈
1EE6	LATIN CAPITAL LETTER U WITH HOOK ABOVE	Ủ
1EE7	LATIN SMALL LETTER U WITH HOOK ABOVE	ủ
1EE8	LATIN CAPITAL LETTER U WITH HORN AND ACUTE	Ứ
1EE9	LATIN SMALL LETTER U WITH HORN AND ACUTE	ứ
1EEA	LATIN CAPITAL LETTER U WITH HORN AND GRAVE	Ừ
1EEB	LATIN SMALL LETTER U WITH HORN AND GRAVE	ừ
1EEC	LATIN CAPITAL LETTER U WITH HORN AND HOOK ABOVE	Ử
1EED	LATIN SMALL LETTER U WITH HORN AND HOOK ABOVE	ử
1EEE	LATIN CAPITAL LETTER U WITH HORN AND TILDE	Ữ
1EEF	LATIN SMALL LETTER U WITH HORN AND TILDE	ữ
1EF0	LATIN CAPITAL LETTER U WITH HORN AND DOT BELOW	Ự
1EF1	LATIN SMALL LETTER U WITH HORN AND DOT BELOW	ự
1EF2	LATIN CAPITAL LETTER Y WITH GRAVE	Ỳ
1EF3	LATIN SMALL LETTER Y WITH GRAVE	ỳ
1EF4	LATIN CAPITAL LETTER Y WITH DOT BELOW	Ỵ
1EF5	LATIN SMALL LETTER Y WITH DOT BELOW	ỵ
1EF6	LATIN CAPITAL LETTER Y WITH HOOK ABOVE	Ỷ
1EF7	LATIN SMALL LETTER Y WITH HOOK ABOVE	ỷ
1EF8	LATIN CAPITAL LETTER Y WITH TILDE	Ỹ
1EF9	LATIN SMALL LETTER Y WITH TILDE	ỹ

==== Non-letters N1 (bnlreq) ====
These characters must be supported to represent names, especially personal names.

Table: Non-Letters N1 (bnlreq)
Code points	Name	Glyph
0020	SPACE	
0027	APOSTROPHE	'
002C	COMMA	,
002D	HYPHEN-MINUS	-
002E	FULL STOP	.
0060	GRAVE ACCENT	'
007E	TILDE	~
00A8	DIAERESIS	¨
00B4	ACUTE ACCENT	'
00B7	MIDDLE DOT	·
02B9	MODIFIER LETTER PRIME	ʹ
02BA	MODIFIER LETTER DOUBLE PRIME	ʺ
02BE	MODIFIER LETTER RIGHT HALF RING	ʾ
02BF	MODIFIER LETTER LEFT HALF RING	ʿ
02C8	MODIFIER LETTER VERTICAL LINE	ˈ
02CC	MODIFIER LETTER LOW VERTICAL LINE	ˌ
2019	RIGHT SINGLE QUOTATION MARK	’
2021	DOUBLE DAGGER	‡

==== Non-letters N2 (bnl) ====
These characters must be supported to represent names in a broader sense, e. g. place names, street names, house numbers, legal entity names, and product names. They are not suitable for personal names.

Table: Non-Letters N2 (bnl)
Code points	Name	Glyph
0021	EXCLAMATION MARK	!
0022	QUOTATION MARK	"
0023	NUMBER SIGN	#
0024	DOLLAR SIGN	$
0025	PERCENT SIGN	%
0026	AMPERSAND	&
0028	LEFT PARENTHESIS	(
0029	RIGHT PARENTHESIS	)
002A	ASTERISK	*
002B	PLUS SIGN	+
002F	SOLIDUS	/
0030	DIGIT ZERO	0
0031	DIGIT ONE	1
0032	DIGIT TWO	2
0033	DIGIT THREE	3
0034	DIGIT FOUR	4
0035	DIGIT FIVE	5
0036	DIGIT SIX	6
0037	DIGIT SEVEN	7
0038	DIGIT EIGHT	8
0039	DIGIT NINE	9
003A	COLON	:
003B	SEMICOLON	;
003C	LESS-THAN SIGN	<
003D	EQUALS SIGN	=
003E	GREATER-THAN SIGN	>
003F	QUESTION MARK	?
0040	COMMERCIAL AT	@
005B	LEFT SQUARE BRACKET	[
005C	REVERSE SOLIDUS	\
005D	RIGHT SQUARE BRACKET	]
005E	CIRCUMFLEX ACCENT	^
005F	LOW LINE	_
007B	LEFT CURLY BRACKET	{
007C	VERTICAL LINE	|
007D	RIGHT CURLY BRACKET	}
00A1	INVERTED EXCLAMATION MARK	¡
00A2	CENT SIGN	¢
00A3	POUND SIGN	£
00A5	YEN SIGN	¥
00A7	SECTION SIGN	§
00A9	COPYRIGHT SIGN	©
00AA	FEMININE ORDINAL INDICATOR	ª
00AB	LEFT-POINTING DOUBLE ANGLE QUOTATION MARK	«
00AC	NOT SIGN	¬
00AE	REGISTERED SIGN	®
00AF	MACRON	¯
00B0	DEGREE SIGN	°
00B1	PLUS-MINUS SIGN	±
00B2	SUPERSCRIPT TWO	²
00B3	SUPERSCRIPT THREE	³
00B5	MICRO SIGN	µ
00B6	PILCROW SIGN	¶
00B9	SUPERSCRIPT ONE	¹
00BA	MASCULINE ORDINAL INDICATOR	º
00BB	RIGHT-POINTING DOUBLE ANGLE QUOTATION MARK	»
00BF	INVERTED QUESTION MARK	¿
00D7	MULTIPLICATION SIGN	×
00F7	DIVISION SIGN	÷
20AC	EURO SIGN	€

==== Non-letters N3 (bnlopt) ====
These letters are included for backwards compatibility with the standard Latin characters in Unicode. Version 1.1.1.

They are not relevant for personal names or other names, only for legal entity names and product names.

Table: Non-Letters N3 (bnlopt)
Code points	Name	Glyph
00A4	CURRENCY SIGN	¤
00A6	BROKEN BAR	¦
00B8	CEDILLA	¸
00BC	VULGAR FRACTION ONE QUARTER	¼
00BD	VULGAR FRACTION ONE HALF	½
00BE	VULGAR FRACTION THREE QUARTERS	¾

==== Non-letters N4 (bnlnot) ====
These whitespace letters are unsuitable for representing names, but they must be processed.

The letter NO-BREAK SPACE is necessary to prevent a line break in special names that could change the meaning. The other letters are included for backwards compatibility with the standard Latin characters in Unicode. Version 1.1.1.

Table: Non-Letters N4 (bnlnot)
Code points	Name
0009	CHARACTER TABULATION
000A	LINE FEED (LF)
000D	CARRIAGE RETURN (CR)
00A0	NO-BREAK SPACE

==== Deprecated letters ====
Existing documents and register entries contain deprecated letters that are no longer used today. These letters must be supported by compliant IT systems. When creating new entries, deprecated letters should not be used.

Table: Deprecated Letters
Deprecated			Replacement		
Code Points	Name	Glyph	Glyph	Code Points	Name
0113 030D	LATIN SMALL LETTER E WITH MACRON WITH COMBINING VERTICAL LINE ABOVE	ē̍	ī́	012B 0301	LATIN SMALL LETTER I WITH MACRON WITH COMBINING ACUTE ACCENT
013F	LATIN CAPITAL LETTER L WITH MIDDLE DOT	Ŀ	L·	004C 00B7	LATIN CAPITAL LETTER L + MIDDLE DOT
0140	LATIN SMALL LETTER L WITH MIDDLE DOT	ŀ	l·	006C 00B7	LATIN SMALL LETTER L + MIDDLE DOT
0149	LATIN SMALL LETTER N PRECEDED BY APOSTROPHE	ŉ	'n	0027 006E	APOSTROPHE + LATIN SMALL LETTER N
014D 030D	LATIN SMALL LETTER O WITH MACRON WITH COMBINING VERTICAL LINE ABOVE	ō̍	ṓ	1E53	LATIN SMALL LETTER O WITH MACRON AND ACUTE
1E17	LATIN SMALL LETTER E WITH MACRON AND ACUTE	ḗ	ī́	012B 0301	LATIN SMALL LETTER I WITH MACRON WITH COMBINING ACUTE ACCENT
030D	COMBINING VERTICAL LINE ABOVE	̍	́	0301	COMBINING ACUTE ACCENT

=== Normative mapping of Latin letters to basic letters (search form) ===
A normative mapping of all normative letters to the basic Latin letters A–Z is given below. This mapping is required, for example, for the machine-readable zone of passports. Another application is the creation of search forms, so that names can be found even if they are spelled differently or without specifying the diacritics.

The following table is based on table 9 of DIN 91379 and chapter 6, table A of the ICAO specifications for machine-readable travel documents. The table was created with the information from the XML file chars.xml in the DIN 91379 appendix.

Entries that appear in the ICAO specification and in table 9 of DIN are marked with ICAO in the Mapping column, additional entries in table 9 of the DIN are marked with EXT. In the Type column, ID is specified for entries that describe an identity mapping, and MAP for other mappings.

Table: Mapping of Latin letters to basic letters (search form)
Source			Destination		Information	
Code points	Name	Glyph	Code points	Glyph	Mapping	Type
0041	LATIN CAPITAL LETTER A	A	0041	A	EXT	ID
0041 030B	LATIN CAPITAL LETTER A WITH COMBINING DOUBLE ACUTE ACCENT	A̋	0041	A	EXT	MAP
0042	LATIN CAPITAL LETTER B	B	0042	B	EXT	ID
0043	LATIN CAPITAL LETTER C	C	0043	C	EXT	ID
0043 0300	LATIN CAPITAL LETTER C WITH COMBINING GRAVE ACCENT	C̀	0043	C	EXT	MAP
0043 0304	LATIN CAPITAL LETTER C WITH COMBINING MACRON	C̄	0043	C	EXT	MAP
0043 0306	LATIN CAPITAL LETTER C WITH COMBINING BREVE	C̆	0043	C	EXT	MAP
0043 0308	LATIN CAPITAL LETTER C WITH COMBINING DIAERESIS	C̈	0043	C	EXT	MAP
0043 0315	LATIN CAPITAL LETTER C WITH COMBINING COMMA ABOVE RIGHT	C̕	0043	C	EXT	MAP
0043 0323	LATIN CAPITAL LETTER C WITH COMBINING DOT BELOW	C̣	0043	C	EXT	MAP
0043 0326	LATIN CAPITAL LETTER C WITH COMBINING COMMA BELOW	C̦	0043	C	EXT	MAP
0043 0328 0306	LATIN CAPITAL LETTER C WITH COMBINING OGONEK AND COMBINING BREVE	C̨̆	0043	C	EXT	MAP
0044	LATIN CAPITAL LETTER D	D	0044	D	EXT	ID
0044 0302	LATIN CAPITAL LETTER D WITH COMBINING CIRCUMFLEX ACCENT	D̂	0044	D	EXT	MAP
0045	LATIN CAPITAL LETTER E	E	0045	E	EXT	ID
0046	LATIN CAPITAL LETTER F	F	0046	F	EXT	ID
0046 0300	LATIN CAPITAL LETTER F WITH COMBINING GRAVE ACCENT	F̀	0046	F	EXT	MAP
0046 0304	LATIN CAPITAL LETTER F WITH COMBINING MACRON	F̄	0046	F	EXT	MAP
0047	LATIN CAPITAL LETTER G	G	0047	G	EXT	ID
0047 0300	LATIN CAPITAL LETTER G WITH COMBINING GRAVE ACCENT	G̀	0047	G	EXT	MAP
0048	LATIN CAPITAL LETTER H	H	0048	H	EXT	ID
0048 0304	LATIN CAPITAL LETTER H WITH COMBINING MACRON	H̄	0048	H	EXT	MAP
0048 0326	LATIN CAPITAL LETTER H WITH COMBINING COMMA BELOW	H̦	0048	H	EXT	MAP
0048 0331	LATIN CAPITAL LETTER H WITH COMBINING MACRON BELOW	H̱	0048	H	EXT	MAP
0049	LATIN CAPITAL LETTER I	I	0049	I	EXT	ID
004A	LATIN CAPITAL LETTER J	J	004A	J	EXT	ID
004A 0301	LATIN CAPITAL LETTER J WITH COMBINING ACUTE ACCENT	J́	004A	J	EXT	MAP
004A 030C	LATIN CAPITAL LETTER J WITH COMBINING CARON	J̌	004A	J	EXT	MAP
004B	LATIN CAPITAL LETTER K	K	004B	K	EXT	ID
004B 0300	LATIN CAPITAL LETTER K WITH COMBINING GRAVE ACCENT	K̀	004B	K	EXT	MAP
004B 0302	LATIN CAPITAL LETTER K WITH COMBINING CIRCUMFLEX ACCENT	K̂	004B	K	EXT	MAP
004B 0304	LATIN CAPITAL LETTER K WITH COMBINING MACRON	K̄	004B	K	EXT	MAP
004B 0307	LATIN CAPITAL LETTER K WITH COMBINING DOT ABOVE	K̇	004B	K	EXT	MAP
004B 0315	LATIN CAPITAL LETTER K WITH COMBINING COMMA ABOVE RIGHT	K̕	004B	K	EXT	MAP
004B 031B	LATIN CAPITAL LETTER K WITH COMBINING HORN	K̛	004B	K	EXT	MAP
004B 0326	LATIN CAPITAL LETTER K WITH COMBINING COMMA BELOW	K̦	004B	K	EXT	MAP
004B 035F 0048	LATIN CAPITAL LETTER K WITH COMBINING DOUBLE MACRON BELOW AND LATIN CAPITAL LETTER H	K͟H	004B 0048	KH	EXT	MAP
004B 035F 0068	LATIN CAPITAL LETTER K WITH COMBINING DOUBLE MACRON BELOW AND LATIN SMALL LETTER H	K͟h	004B 0048	KH	EXT	MAP
004C	LATIN CAPITAL LETTER L	L	004C	L	EXT	ID
004C 0302	LATIN CAPITAL LETTER L WITH COMBINING CIRCUMFLEX ACCENT	L̂	004C	L	EXT	MAP
004C 0325	LATIN CAPITAL LETTER L WITH COMBINING RING BELOW	L̥	004C	L	EXT	MAP
004C 0325 0304	LATIN CAPITAL LETTER L WITH COMBINING RING BELOW AND COMBINING MACRON	L̥̄	004C	L	EXT	MAP
004C 0326	LATIN CAPITAL LETTER L WITH COMBINING COMMA BELOW	L̦	004C	L	EXT	MAP
004D	LATIN CAPITAL LETTER M	M	004D	M	EXT	ID
004D 0300	LATIN CAPITAL LETTER M WITH COMBINING GRAVE ACCENT	M̀	004D	M	EXT	MAP
004D 0302	LATIN CAPITAL LETTER M WITH COMBINING CIRCUMFLEX ACCENT	M̂	004D	M	EXT	MAP
004D 0306	LATIN CAPITAL LETTER M WITH COMBINING BREVE	M̆	004D	M	EXT	MAP
004D 0310	LATIN CAPITAL LETTER M WITH COMBINING CANDRABINDU	M̐	004D	M	EXT	MAP
004E	LATIN CAPITAL LETTER N	N	004E	N	EXT	ID
004E 0302	LATIN CAPITAL LETTER N WITH COMBINING CIRCUMFLEX ACCENT	N̂	004E	N	EXT	MAP
004E 0304	LATIN CAPITAL LETTER N WITH COMBINING MACRON	N̄	004E	N	EXT	MAP
004E 0306	LATIN CAPITAL LETTER N WITH COMBINING BREVE	N̆	004E	N	EXT	MAP
004E 0326	LATIN CAPITAL LETTER N WITH COMBINING COMMA BELOW	N̦	004E	N	EXT	MAP
004F	LATIN CAPITAL LETTER O	O	004F	O	EXT	ID
0050	LATIN CAPITAL LETTER P	P	0050	P	EXT	ID
0050 0300	LATIN CAPITAL LETTER P WITH COMBINING GRAVE ACCENT	P̀	0050	P	EXT	MAP
0050 0304	LATIN CAPITAL LETTER P WITH COMBINING MACRON	P̄	0050	P	EXT	MAP
0050 0315	LATIN CAPITAL LETTER P WITH COMBINING COMMA ABOVE RIGHT	P̕	0050	P	EXT	MAP
0050 0323	LATIN CAPITAL LETTER P WITH COMBINING DOT BELOW	P̣	0050	P	EXT	MAP
0051	LATIN CAPITAL LETTER Q	Q	0051	Q	EXT	ID
0052	LATIN CAPITAL LETTER R	R	0052	R	EXT	ID
0052 0306	LATIN CAPITAL LETTER R WITH COMBINING BREVE	R̆	0052	R	EXT	MAP
0052 0325	LATIN CAPITAL LETTER R WITH COMBINING RING BELOW	R̥	0052	R	EXT	MAP
0052 0325 0304	LATIN CAPITAL LETTER R WITH COMBINING RING BELOW AND COMBINING MACRON	R̥̄	0052	R	EXT	MAP
0053	LATIN CAPITAL LETTER S	S	0053	S	EXT	ID
0053 0300	LATIN CAPITAL LETTER S WITH COMBINING GRAVE ACCENT	S̀	0053	S	EXT	MAP
0053 0304	LATIN CAPITAL LETTER S WITH COMBINING MACRON	S̄	0053	S	EXT	MAP
0053 031B 0304	LATIN CAPITAL LETTER S WITH COMBINING HORN AND COMBINING MACRON	S̛̄	0053	S	EXT	MAP
0053 0331	LATIN CAPITAL LETTER S WITH COMBINING MACRON BELOW	S̱	0053	S	EXT	MAP
0054	LATIN CAPITAL LETTER T	T	0054	T	EXT	ID
0054 0300	LATIN CAPITAL LETTER T WITH COMBINING GRAVE ACCENT	T̀	0054	T	EXT	MAP
0054 0304	LATIN CAPITAL LETTER T WITH COMBINING MACRON	T̄	0054	T	EXT	MAP
0054 0308	LATIN CAPITAL LETTER T WITH COMBINING DIAERESIS	T̈	0054	T	EXT	MAP
0054 0315	LATIN CAPITAL LETTER T WITH COMBINING COMMA ABOVE RIGHT	T̕	0054	T	EXT	MAP
0054 031B	LATIN CAPITAL LETTER T WITH COMBINING HORN	T̛	0054	T	EXT	MAP
0055	LATIN CAPITAL LETTER U	U	0055	U	EXT	ID
0055 0307	LATIN CAPITAL LETTER U WITH COMBINING DOT ABOVE	U̇	0055	U	EXT	MAP
0056	LATIN CAPITAL LETTER V	V	0056	V	EXT	ID
0057	LATIN CAPITAL LETTER W	W	0057	W	EXT	ID
0058	LATIN CAPITAL LETTER X	X	0058	X	EXT	ID
0059	LATIN CAPITAL LETTER Y	Y	0059	Y	EXT	ID
005A	LATIN CAPITAL LETTER Z	Z	005A	Z	EXT	ID
005A 0300	LATIN CAPITAL LETTER Z WITH COMBINING GRAVE ACCENT	Z̀	005A	Z	EXT	MAP
005A 0304	LATIN CAPITAL LETTER Z WITH COMBINING MACRON	Z̄	005A	Z	EXT	MAP
005A 0306	LATIN CAPITAL LETTER Z WITH COMBINING BREVE	Z̆	005A	Z	EXT	MAP
005A 0308	LATIN CAPITAL LETTER Z WITH COMBINING DIAERESIS	Z̈	005A	Z	EXT	MAP
005A 0327	LATIN CAPITAL LETTER Z WITH COMBINING CEDILLA	Z̧	005A	Z	EXT	MAP
0061	LATIN SMALL LETTER A	a	0041	A	EXT	MAP
0061 030B	LATIN SMALL LETTER A WITH COMBINING DOUBLE ACUTE ACCENT	a̋	0041	A	EXT	MAP
0062	LATIN SMALL LETTER B	b	0042	B	EXT	MAP
0063	LATIN SMALL LETTER C	c	0043	C	EXT	MAP
0063 0300	LATIN SMALL LETTER C WITH COMBINING GRAVE ACCENT	c̀	0043	C	EXT	MAP
0063 0304	LATIN SMALL LETTER C WITH COMBINING MACRON	c̄	0043	C	EXT	MAP
0063 0306	LATIN SMALL LETTER C WITH COMBINING BREVE	c̆	0043	C	EXT	MAP
0063 0308	LATIN SMALL LETTER C WITH COMBINING DIAERESIS	c̈	0043	C	EXT	MAP
0063 0315	LATIN SMALL LETTER C WITH COMBINING COMMA ABOVE RIGHT	c̕	0043	C	EXT	MAP
0063 0323	LATIN SMALL LETTER C WITH COMBINING DOT BELOW	c̣	0043	C	EXT	MAP
0063 0326	LATIN SMALL LETTER C WITH COMBINING COMMA BELOW	c̦	0043	C	EXT	MAP
0063 0328 0306	LATIN SMALL LETTER C WITH COMBINING OGONEK AND COMBINING BREVE	c̨̆	0043	C	EXT	MAP
0064	LATIN SMALL LETTER D	d	0044	D	EXT	MAP
0064 0302	LATIN SMALL LETTER D WITH COMBINING CIRCUMFLEX ACCENT	d̂	0044	D	EXT	MAP
0065	LATIN SMALL LETTER E	e	0045	E	EXT	MAP
0066	LATIN SMALL LETTER F	f	0046	F	EXT	MAP
0066 0300	LATIN SMALL LETTER F WITH COMBINING GRAVE ACCENT	f̀	0046	F	EXT	MAP
0066 0304	LATIN SMALL LETTER F WITH COMBINING MACRON	f̄	0046	F	EXT	MAP
0067	LATIN SMALL LETTER G	g	0047	G	EXT	MAP
0067 0300	LATIN SMALL LETTER G WITH COMBINING GRAVE ACCENT	g̀	0047	G	EXT	MAP
0068	LATIN SMALL LETTER H	h	0048	H	EXT	MAP
0068 0304	LATIN SMALL LETTER H WITH COMBINING MACRON	h̄	0048	H	EXT	MAP
0068 0326	LATIN SMALL LETTER H WITH COMBINING COMMA BELOW	h̦	0048	H	EXT	MAP
0069	LATIN SMALL LETTER I	i	0049	I	EXT	MAP
006A	LATIN SMALL LETTER J	j	004A	J	EXT	MAP
006A 0301	LATIN SMALL LETTER J WITH COMBINING ACUTE ACCENT	j́	004A	J	EXT	MAP
006B	LATIN SMALL LETTER K	k	004B	K	EXT	MAP
006B 0300	LATIN SMALL LETTER K WITH COMBINING GRAVE ACCENT	k̀	004B	K	EXT	MAP
006B 0302	LATIN SMALL LETTER K WITH COMBINING CIRCUMFLEX ACCENT	k̂	004B	K	EXT	MAP
006B 0304	LATIN SMALL LETTER K WITH COMBINING MACRON	k̄	004B	K	EXT	MAP
006B 0307	LATIN SMALL LETTER K WITH COMBINING DOT ABOVE	k̇	004B	K	EXT	MAP
006B 0315	LATIN SMALL LETTER K WITH COMBINING COMMA ABOVE RIGHT	k̕	004B	K	EXT	MAP
006B 031B	LATIN SMALL LETTER K WITH COMBINING HORN	k̛	004B	K	EXT	MAP
006B 0326	LATIN SMALL LETTER K WITH COMBINING COMMA BELOW	k̦	004B	K	EXT	MAP
006B 035F 0068	LATIN SMALL LETTER K WITH COMBINING DOUBLE MACRON BELOW AND LATIN SMALL LETTER H	k͟h	004B 0048	KH	EXT	MAP
006C	LATIN SMALL LETTER L	l	004C	L	EXT	MAP
006C 0302	LATIN SMALL LETTER L WITH COMBINING CIRCUMFLEX ACCENT	l̂	004C	L	EXT	MAP
006C 0325	LATIN SMALL LETTER L WITH COMBINING RING BELOW	l̥	004C	L	EXT	MAP
006C 0325 0304	LATIN SMALL LETTER L WITH COMBINING RING BELOW AND COMBINING MACRON	l̥̄	004C	L	EXT	MAP
006C 0326	LATIN SMALL LETTER L WITH COMBINING COMMA BELOW	l̦	004C	L	EXT	MAP
006D	LATIN SMALL LETTER M	m	004D	M	EXT	MAP
006D 0300	LATIN SMALL LETTER M WITH COMBINING GRAVE ACCENT	m̀	004D	M	EXT	MAP
006D 0302	LATIN SMALL LETTER M WITH COMBINING CIRCUMFLEX ACCENT	m̂	004D	M	EXT	MAP
006D 0306	LATIN SMALL LETTER M WITH COMBINING BREVE	m̆	004D	M	EXT	MAP
006D 0310	LATIN SMALL LETTER M WITH COMBINING CANDRABINDU	m̐	004D	M	EXT	MAP
006E	LATIN SMALL LETTER N	n	004E	N	EXT	MAP
006E 0302	LATIN SMALL LETTER N WITH COMBINING CIRCUMFLEX ACCENT	n̂	004E	N	EXT	MAP
006E 0304	LATIN SMALL LETTER N WITH COMBINING MACRON	n̄	004E	N	EXT	MAP
006E 0306	LATIN SMALL LETTER N WITH COMBINING BREVE	n̆	004E	N	EXT	MAP
006E 0326	LATIN SMALL LETTER N WITH COMBINING COMMA BELOW	n̦	004E	N	EXT	MAP
006F	LATIN SMALL LETTER O	o	004F	O	EXT	MAP
0070	LATIN SMALL LETTER P	p	0050	P	EXT	MAP
0070 0300	LATIN SMALL LETTER P WITH COMBINING GRAVE ACCENT	p̀	0050	P	EXT	MAP
0070 0304	LATIN SMALL LETTER P WITH COMBINING MACRON	p̄	0050	P	EXT	MAP
0070 0315	LATIN SMALL LETTER P WITH COMBINING COMMA ABOVE RIGHT	p̕	0050	P	EXT	MAP
0070 0323	LATIN SMALL LETTER P WITH COMBINING DOT BELOW	p̣	0050	P	EXT	MAP
0071	LATIN SMALL LETTER Q	q	0051	Q	EXT	MAP
0072	LATIN SMALL LETTER R	r	0052	R	EXT	MAP
0072 0306	LATIN SMALL LETTER R WITH COMBINING BREVE	r̆	0052	R	EXT	MAP
0072 0325	LATIN SMALL LETTER R WITH COMBINING RING BELOW	r̥	0052	R	EXT	MAP
0072 0325 0304	LATIN SMALL LETTER R WITH COMBINING RING BELOW AND COMBINING MACRON	r̥̄	0052	R	EXT	MAP
0073	LATIN SMALL LETTER S	s	0053	S	EXT	MAP
0073 0300	LATIN SMALL LETTER S WITH COMBINING GRAVE ACCENT	s̀	0053	S	EXT	MAP
0073 0304	LATIN SMALL LETTER S WITH COMBINING MACRON	s̄	0053	S	EXT	MAP
0073 031B 0304	LATIN SMALL LETTER S WITH COMBINING HORN AND COMBINING MACRON	s̛̄	0053	S	EXT	MAP
0073 0331	LATIN SMALL LETTER S WITH COMBINING MACRON BELOW	s̱	0053	S	EXT	MAP
0074	LATIN SMALL LETTER T	t	0054	T	EXT	MAP
0074 0300	LATIN SMALL LETTER T WITH COMBINING GRAVE ACCENT	t̀	0054	T	EXT	MAP
0074 0304	LATIN SMALL LETTER T WITH COMBINING MACRON	t̄	0054	T	EXT	MAP
0074 0315	LATIN SMALL LETTER T WITH COMBINING COMMA ABOVE RIGHT	t̕	0054	T	EXT	MAP
0074 031B	LATIN SMALL LETTER T WITH COMBINING HORN	t̛	0054	T	EXT	MAP
0075	LATIN SMALL LETTER U	u	0055	U	EXT	MAP
0075 0307	LATIN SMALL LETTER U WITH COMBINING DOT ABOVE	u̇	0055	U	EXT	MAP
0076	LATIN SMALL LETTER V	v	0056	V	EXT	MAP
0077	LATIN SMALL LETTER W	w	0057	W	EXT	MAP
0078	LATIN SMALL LETTER X	x	0058	X	EXT	MAP
0079	LATIN SMALL LETTER Y	y	0059	Y	EXT	MAP
007A	LATIN SMALL LETTER Z	z	005A	Z	EXT	MAP
007A 0300	LATIN SMALL LETTER Z WITH COMBINING GRAVE ACCENT	z̀	005A	Z	EXT	MAP
007A 0304	LATIN SMALL LETTER Z WITH COMBINING MACRON	z̄	005A	Z	EXT	MAP
007A 0306	LATIN SMALL LETTER Z WITH COMBINING BREVE	z̆	005A	Z	EXT	MAP
007A 0308	LATIN SMALL LETTER Z WITH COMBINING DIAERESIS	z̈	005A	Z	EXT	MAP
007A 0327	LATIN SMALL LETTER Z WITH COMBINING CEDILLA	z̧	005A	Z	EXT	MAP
00C0	LATIN CAPITAL LETTER A WITH GRAVE	À	0041	A	ICAO	MAP
00C1	LATIN CAPITAL LETTER A WITH ACUTE	Á	0041	A	ICAO	MAP
00C2	LATIN CAPITAL LETTER A WITH CIRCUMFLEX	Â	0041	A	ICAO	MAP
00C3	LATIN CAPITAL LETTER A WITH TILDE	Ã	0041	A	ICAO	MAP
00C4	LATIN CAPITAL LETTER A WITH DIAERESIS	Ä	0041 0045	AE	ICAO	MAP
00C5	LATIN CAPITAL LETTER A WITH RING ABOVE	Å	0041 0041	AA	ICAO	MAP
00C6	LATIN CAPITAL LETTER AE	Æ	0041 0045	AE	ICAO	MAP
00C7	LATIN CAPITAL LETTER C WITH CEDILLA	Ç	0043	C	ICAO	MAP
00C7 0306	LATIN CAPITAL LETTER C WITH CEDILLA WITH COMBINING BREVE	Ç̆	0043	C	EXT	MAP
00C8	LATIN CAPITAL LETTER E WITH GRAVE	È	0045	E	ICAO	MAP
00C9	LATIN CAPITAL LETTER E WITH ACUTE	É	0045	E	ICAO	MAP
00CA	LATIN CAPITAL LETTER E WITH CIRCUMFLEX	Ê	0045	E	ICAO	MAP
00CB	LATIN CAPITAL LETTER E WITH DIAERESIS	Ë	0045	E	ICAO	MAP
00CC	LATIN CAPITAL LETTER I WITH GRAVE	Ì	0049	I	ICAO	MAP
00CD	LATIN CAPITAL LETTER I WITH ACUTE	Í	0049	I	ICAO	MAP
00CE	LATIN CAPITAL LETTER I WITH CIRCUMFLEX	Î	0049	I	ICAO	MAP
00CF	LATIN CAPITAL LETTER I WITH DIAERESIS	Ï	0049	I	ICAO	MAP
00D0	LATIN CAPITAL LETTER ETH	Ð	0044	D	EXT	MAP
00D1	LATIN CAPITAL LETTER N WITH TILDE	Ñ	004E	N	ICAO	MAP
00D2	LATIN CAPITAL LETTER O WITH GRAVE	Ò	004F	O	ICAO	MAP
00D3	LATIN CAPITAL LETTER O WITH ACUTE	Ó	004F	O	ICAO	MAP
00D4	LATIN CAPITAL LETTER O WITH CIRCUMFLEX	Ô	004F	O	ICAO	MAP
00D5	LATIN CAPITAL LETTER O WITH TILDE	Õ	004F	O	ICAO	MAP
00D6	LATIN CAPITAL LETTER O WITH DIAERESIS	Ö	004F 0045	OE	ICAO	MAP
00D8	LATIN CAPITAL LETTER O WITH STROKE	Ø	004F 0045	OE	ICAO	MAP
00D9	LATIN CAPITAL LETTER U WITH GRAVE	Ù	0055	U	ICAO	MAP
00DA	LATIN CAPITAL LETTER U WITH ACUTE	Ú	0055	U	ICAO	MAP
00DB	LATIN CAPITAL LETTER U WITH CIRCUMFLEX	Û	0055	U	ICAO	MAP
00DB 0304	LATIN CAPITAL LETTER U WITH CIRCUMFLEX WITH COMBINING MACRON	Û̄	0055	U	EXT	MAP
00DC	LATIN CAPITAL LETTER U WITH DIAERESIS	Ü	0055 0045	UE	ICAO	MAP
00DD	LATIN CAPITAL LETTER Y WITH ACUTE	Ý	0059	Y	ICAO	MAP
00DE	LATIN CAPITAL LETTER THORN	Þ	0054 0048	TH	EXT	MAP
00DF	LATIN SMALL LETTER SHARP S	ß	0053 0053	SS	ICAO	MAP
00E0	LATIN SMALL LETTER A WITH GRAVE	à	0041	A	EXT	MAP
00E1	LATIN SMALL LETTER A WITH ACUTE	á	0041	A	EXT	MAP
00E2	LATIN SMALL LETTER A WITH CIRCUMFLEX	â	0041	A	EXT	MAP
00E3	LATIN SMALL LETTER A WITH TILDE	ã	0041	A	EXT	MAP
00E4	LATIN SMALL LETTER A WITH DIAERESIS	ä	0041 0045	AE	EXT	MAP
00E5	LATIN SMALL LETTER A WITH RING ABOVE	å	0041 0041	AA	EXT	MAP
00E6	LATIN SMALL LETTER AE	æ	0041 0045	AE	EXT	MAP
00E7	LATIN SMALL LETTER C WITH CEDILLA	ç	0043	C	EXT	MAP
00E7 0306	LATIN SMALL LETTER C WITH CEDILLA WITH COMBINING BREVE	ç̆	0043	C	EXT	MAP
00E8	LATIN SMALL LETTER E WITH GRAVE	è	0045	E	EXT	MAP
00E9	LATIN SMALL LETTER E WITH ACUTE	é	0045	E	EXT	MAP
00EA	LATIN SMALL LETTER E WITH CIRCUMFLEX	ê	0045	E	EXT	MAP
00EB	LATIN SMALL LETTER E WITH DIAERESIS	ë	0045	E	EXT	MAP
00EC	LATIN SMALL LETTER I WITH GRAVE	ì	0049	I	EXT	MAP
00ED	LATIN SMALL LETTER I WITH ACUTE	í	0049	I	EXT	MAP
00EE	LATIN SMALL LETTER I WITH CIRCUMFLEX	î	0049	I	EXT	MAP
00EF	LATIN SMALL LETTER I WITH DIAERESIS	ï	0049	I	EXT	MAP
00F0	LATIN SMALL LETTER ETH	ð	0044	D	EXT	MAP
00F1	LATIN SMALL LETTER N WITH TILDE	ñ	004E	N	EXT	MAP
00F2	LATIN SMALL LETTER O WITH GRAVE	ò	004F	O	EXT	MAP
00F3	LATIN SMALL LETTER O WITH ACUTE	ó	004F	O	EXT	MAP
00F4	LATIN SMALL LETTER O WITH CIRCUMFLEX	ô	004F	O	EXT	MAP
00F5	LATIN SMALL LETTER O WITH TILDE	õ	004F	O	EXT	MAP
00F6	LATIN SMALL LETTER O WITH DIAERESIS	ö	004F 0045	OE	EXT	MAP
00F8	LATIN SMALL LETTER O WITH STROKE	ø	004F 0045	OE	EXT	MAP
00F9	LATIN SMALL LETTER U WITH GRAVE	ù	0055	U	EXT	MAP
00FA	LATIN SMALL LETTER U WITH ACUTE	ú	0055	U	EXT	MAP
00FB	LATIN SMALL LETTER U WITH CIRCUMFLEX	û	0055	U	EXT	MAP
00FB 0304	LATIN SMALL LETTER U WITH CIRCUMFLEX WITH COMBINING MACRON	û̄	0055	U	EXT	MAP
00FC	LATIN SMALL LETTER U WITH DIAERESIS	ü	0055 0045	UE	EXT	MAP
00FD	LATIN SMALL LETTER Y WITH ACUTE	ý	0059	Y	EXT	MAP
00FE	LATIN SMALL LETTER THORN	þ	0054 0048	TH	ICAO	MAP
00FF	LATIN SMALL LETTER Y WITH DIAERESIS	ÿ	0059	Y	EXT	MAP
00FF 0301	LATIN SMALL LETTER Y WITH DIAERESIS WITH COMBINING ACUTE ACCENT	ÿ́	0059	Y	EXT	MAP
0100	LATIN CAPITAL LETTER A WITH MACRON	Ā	0041	A	ICAO	MAP
0101	LATIN SMALL LETTER A WITH MACRON	ā	0041	A	EXT	MAP
0102	LATIN CAPITAL LETTER A WITH BREVE	Ă	0041	A	ICAO	MAP
0103	LATIN SMALL LETTER A WITH BREVE	ă	0041	A	EXT	MAP
0104	LATIN CAPITAL LETTER A WITH OGONEK	Ą	0041	A	ICAO	MAP
0105	LATIN SMALL LETTER A WITH OGONEK	ą	0041	A	EXT	MAP
0106	LATIN CAPITAL LETTER C WITH ACUTE	Ć	0043	C	ICAO	MAP
0107	LATIN SMALL LETTER C WITH ACUTE	ć	0043	C	EXT	MAP
0108	LATIN CAPITAL LETTER C WITH CIRCUMFLEX	Ĉ	0043	C	ICAO	MAP
0109	LATIN SMALL LETTER C WITH CIRCUMFLEX	ĉ	0043	C	EXT	MAP
010A	LATIN CAPITAL LETTER C WITH DOT ABOVE	Ċ	0043	C	ICAO	MAP
010B	LATIN SMALL LETTER C WITH DOT ABOVE	ċ	0043	C	EXT	MAP
010C	LATIN CAPITAL LETTER C WITH CARON	Č	0043	C	ICAO	MAP
010C 0315	LATIN CAPITAL LETTER C WITH CARON WITH COMBINING COMMA ABOVE RIGHT	Č̕	0043	C	EXT	MAP
010C 0323	LATIN CAPITAL LETTER C WITH CARON WITH COMBINING DOT BELOW	Č̣	0043	C	EXT	MAP
010D	LATIN SMALL LETTER C WITH CARON	č	0043	C	EXT	MAP
010D 0315	LATIN SMALL LETTER C WITH CARON WITH COMBINING COMMA ABOVE RIGHT	č̕	0043	C	EXT	MAP
010D 0323	LATIN SMALL LETTER C WITH CARON WITH COMBINING DOT BELOW	č̣	0043	C	EXT	MAP
010E	LATIN CAPITAL LETTER D WITH CARON	Ď	0044	D	ICAO	MAP
010F	LATIN SMALL LETTER D WITH CARON	ď	0044	D	EXT	MAP
0110	LATIN CAPITAL LETTER D WITH STROKE	Đ	0044	D	ICAO	MAP
0111	LATIN SMALL LETTER D WITH STROKE	đ	0044	D	EXT	MAP
0112	LATIN CAPITAL LETTER E WITH MACRON	Ē	0045	E	ICAO	MAP
0113	LATIN SMALL LETTER E WITH MACRON	ē	0045	E	EXT	MAP
0113 030D	LATIN SMALL LETTER E WITH MACRON WITH COMBINING VERTICAL LINE ABOVE	ē̍	0045	E	EXT	MAP
0114	LATIN CAPITAL LETTER E WITH BREVE	Ĕ	0045	E	ICAO	MAP
0115	LATIN SMALL LETTER E WITH BREVE	ĕ	0045	E	EXT	MAP
0116	LATIN CAPITAL LETTER E WITH DOT ABOVE	Ė	0045	E	ICAO	MAP
0117	LATIN SMALL LETTER E WITH DOT ABOVE	ė	0045	E	EXT	MAP
0118	LATIN CAPITAL LETTER E WITH OGONEK	Ę	0045	E	ICAO	MAP
0119	LATIN SMALL LETTER E WITH OGONEK	ę	0045	E	EXT	MAP
011A	LATIN CAPITAL LETTER E WITH CARON	Ě	0045	E	ICAO	MAP
011B	LATIN SMALL LETTER E WITH CARON	ě	0045	E	EXT	MAP
011C	LATIN CAPITAL LETTER G WITH CIRCUMFLEX	Ĝ	0047	G	ICAO	MAP
011D	LATIN SMALL LETTER G WITH CIRCUMFLEX	ĝ	0047	G	EXT	MAP
011E	LATIN CAPITAL LETTER G WITH BREVE	Ğ	0047	G	ICAO	MAP
011F	LATIN SMALL LETTER G WITH BREVE	ğ	0047	G	EXT	MAP
0120	LATIN CAPITAL LETTER G WITH DOT ABOVE	Ġ	0047	G	ICAO	MAP
0121	LATIN SMALL LETTER G WITH DOT ABOVE	ġ	0047	G	EXT	MAP
0122	LATIN CAPITAL LETTER G WITH CEDILLA	Ģ	0047	G	ICAO	MAP
0123	LATIN SMALL LETTER G WITH CEDILLA	ģ	0047	G	EXT	MAP
0124	LATIN CAPITAL LETTER H WITH CIRCUMFLEX	Ĥ	0048	H	ICAO	MAP
0125	LATIN SMALL LETTER H WITH CIRCUMFLEX	ĥ	0048	H	EXT	MAP
0126	LATIN CAPITAL LETTER H WITH STROKE	Ħ	0048	H	ICAO	MAP
0127	LATIN SMALL LETTER H WITH STROKE	ħ	0048	H	EXT	MAP
0128	LATIN CAPITAL LETTER I WITH TILDE	Ĩ	0049	I	ICAO	MAP
0129	LATIN SMALL LETTER I WITH TILDE	ĩ	0049	I	EXT	MAP
012A	LATIN CAPITAL LETTER I WITH MACRON	Ī	0049	I	ICAO	MAP
012A 0301	LATIN CAPITAL LETTER I WITH MACRON WITH COMBINING ACUTE ACCENT	Ī́	0049	I	EXT	MAP
012B	LATIN SMALL LETTER I WITH MACRON	ī	0049	I	EXT	MAP
012B 0301	LATIN SMALL LETTER I WITH MACRON WITH COMBINING ACUTE ACCENT	ī́	0049	I	EXT	MAP
012C	LATIN CAPITAL LETTER I WITH BREVE	Ĭ	0049	I	ICAO	MAP
012D	LATIN SMALL LETTER I WITH BREVE	ĭ	0049	I	EXT	MAP
012E	LATIN CAPITAL LETTER I WITH OGONEK	Į	0049	I	ICAO	MAP
012F	LATIN SMALL LETTER I WITH OGONEK	į	0049	I	EXT	MAP
0130	LATIN CAPITAL LETTER I WITH DOT ABOVE	İ	0049	I	ICAO	MAP
0131	LATIN SMALL LETTER DOTLESS I	ı	0049	I	EXT	MAP
0132	LATIN CAPITAL LIGATURE IJ	Ĳ	0049 004A	IJ	ICAO	MAP
0133	LATIN SMALL LIGATURE IJ	ĳ	0049 004A	IJ	EXT	MAP
0134	LATIN CAPITAL LETTER J WITH CIRCUMFLEX	Ĵ	004A	J	ICAO	MAP
0135	LATIN SMALL LETTER J WITH CIRCUMFLEX	ĵ	004A	J	EXT	MAP
0136	LATIN CAPITAL LETTER K WITH CEDILLA	Ķ	004B	K	ICAO	MAP
0137	LATIN SMALL LETTER K WITH CEDILLA	ķ	004B	K	EXT	MAP
0138	LATIN SMALL LETTER KRA	ĸ	004B	K	EXT	MAP
0139	LATIN CAPITAL LETTER L WITH ACUTE	Ĺ	004C	L	ICAO	MAP
013A	LATIN SMALL LETTER L WITH ACUTE	ĺ	004C	L	EXT	MAP
013B	LATIN CAPITAL LETTER L WITH CEDILLA	Ļ	004C	L	ICAO	MAP
013C	LATIN SMALL LETTER L WITH CEDILLA	ļ	004C	L	EXT	MAP
013D	LATIN CAPITAL LETTER L WITH CARON	Ľ	004C	L	ICAO	MAP
013E	LATIN SMALL LETTER L WITH CARON	ľ	004C	L	EXT	MAP
013F	LATIN CAPITAL LETTER L WITH MIDDLE DOT	Ŀ	004C	L	ICAO	MAP
0140	LATIN SMALL LETTER L WITH MIDDLE DOT	ŀ	004C	L	EXT	MAP
0141	LATIN CAPITAL LETTER L WITH STROKE	Ł	004C	L	ICAO	MAP
0142	LATIN SMALL LETTER L WITH STROKE	ł	004C	L	EXT	MAP
0143	LATIN CAPITAL LETTER N WITH ACUTE	Ń	004E	N	ICAO	MAP
0144	LATIN SMALL LETTER N WITH ACUTE	ń	004E	N	EXT	MAP
0145	LATIN CAPITAL LETTER N WITH CEDILLA	Ņ	004E	N	ICAO	MAP
0146	LATIN SMALL LETTER N WITH CEDILLA	ņ	004E	N	EXT	MAP
0147	LATIN CAPITAL LETTER N WITH CARON	Ň	004E	N	ICAO	MAP
0148	LATIN SMALL LETTER N WITH CARON	ň	004E	N	EXT	MAP
0149	LATIN SMALL LETTER N PRECEDED BY APOSTROPHE	ŉ	004E	N	EXT	MAP
014A	LATIN CAPITAL LETTER ENG	Ŋ	004E	N	EXT	MAP
014B	LATIN SMALL LETTER ENG	ŋ	004E	N	ICAO	MAP
014C	LATIN CAPITAL LETTER O WITH MACRON	Ō	004F	O	ICAO	MAP
014D	LATIN SMALL LETTER O WITH MACRON	ō	004F	O	EXT	MAP
014D 030D	LATIN SMALL LETTER O WITH MACRON WITH COMBINING VERTICAL LINE ABOVE	ō̍	004F	O	EXT	MAP
014E	LATIN CAPITAL LETTER O WITH BREVE	Ŏ	004F	O	ICAO	MAP
014F	LATIN SMALL LETTER O WITH BREVE	ŏ	004F	O	EXT	MAP
0150	LATIN CAPITAL LETTER O WITH DOUBLE ACUTE	Ő	004F	O	ICAO	MAP
0151	LATIN SMALL LETTER O WITH DOUBLE ACUTE	ő	004F	O	EXT	MAP
0152	LATIN CAPITAL LIGATURE OE	Œ	004F 0045	OE	ICAO	MAP
0153	LATIN SMALL LIGATURE OE	œ	004F 0045	OE	EXT	MAP
0154	LATIN CAPITAL LETTER R WITH ACUTE	Ŕ	0052	R	ICAO	MAP
0155	LATIN SMALL LETTER R WITH ACUTE	ŕ	0052	R	EXT	MAP
0156	LATIN CAPITAL LETTER R WITH CEDILLA	Ŗ	0052	R	ICAO	MAP
0157	LATIN SMALL LETTER R WITH CEDILLA	ŗ	0052	R	EXT	MAP
0158	LATIN CAPITAL LETTER R WITH CARON	Ř	0052	R	ICAO	MAP
0159	LATIN SMALL LETTER R WITH CARON	ř	0052	R	EXT	MAP
015A	LATIN CAPITAL LETTER S WITH ACUTE	Ś	0053	S	ICAO	MAP
015B	LATIN SMALL LETTER S WITH ACUTE	ś	0053	S	EXT	MAP
015C	LATIN CAPITAL LETTER S WITH CIRCUMFLEX	Ŝ	0053	S	ICAO	MAP
015D	LATIN SMALL LETTER S WITH CIRCUMFLEX	ŝ	0053	S	EXT	MAP
015E	LATIN CAPITAL LETTER S WITH CEDILLA	Ş	0053	S	ICAO	MAP
015F	LATIN SMALL LETTER S WITH CEDILLA	ş	0053	S	EXT	MAP
0160	LATIN CAPITAL LETTER S WITH CARON	Š	0053	S	ICAO	MAP
0161	LATIN SMALL LETTER S WITH CARON	š	0053	S	EXT	MAP
0162	LATIN CAPITAL LETTER T WITH CEDILLA	Ţ	0054	T	ICAO	MAP
0163	LATIN SMALL LETTER T WITH CEDILLA	ţ	0054	T	EXT	MAP
0164	LATIN CAPITAL LETTER T WITH CARON	Ť	0054	T	ICAO	MAP
0165	LATIN SMALL LETTER T WITH CARON	ť	0054	T	EXT	MAP
0166	LATIN CAPITAL LETTER T WITH STROKE	Ŧ	0054	T	ICAO	MAP
0167	LATIN SMALL LETTER T WITH STROKE	ŧ	0054	T	EXT	MAP
0168	LATIN CAPITAL LETTER U WITH TILDE	Ũ	0055	U	ICAO	MAP
0169	LATIN SMALL LETTER U WITH TILDE	ũ	0055	U	EXT	MAP
016A	LATIN CAPITAL LETTER U WITH MACRON	Ū	0055	U	ICAO	MAP
016B	LATIN SMALL LETTER U WITH MACRON	ū	0055	U	EXT	MAP
016C	LATIN CAPITAL LETTER U WITH BREVE	Ŭ	0055	U	ICAO	MAP
016D	LATIN SMALL LETTER U WITH BREVE	ŭ	0055	U	EXT	MAP
016E	LATIN CAPITAL LETTER U WITH RING ABOVE	Ů	0055	U	ICAO	MAP
016F	LATIN SMALL LETTER U WITH RING ABOVE	ů	0055	U	EXT	MAP
0170	LATIN CAPITAL LETTER U WITH DOUBLE ACUTE	Ű	0055	U	ICAO	MAP
0171	LATIN SMALL LETTER U WITH DOUBLE ACUTE	ű	0055	U	EXT	MAP
0172	LATIN CAPITAL LETTER U WITH OGONEK	Ų	0055	U	ICAO	MAP
0173	LATIN SMALL LETTER U WITH OGONEK	ų	0055	U	EXT	MAP
0174	LATIN CAPITAL LETTER W WITH CIRCUMFLEX	Ŵ	0057	W	ICAO	MAP
0175	LATIN SMALL LETTER W WITH CIRCUMFLEX	ŵ	0057	W	EXT	MAP
0176	LATIN CAPITAL LETTER Y WITH CIRCUMFLEX	Ŷ	0059	Y	ICAO	MAP
0177	LATIN SMALL LETTER Y WITH CIRCUMFLEX	ŷ	0059	Y	EXT	MAP
0178	LATIN CAPITAL LETTER Y WITH DIAERESIS	Ÿ	0059	Y	ICAO	MAP
0179	LATIN CAPITAL LETTER Z WITH ACUTE	Ź	005A	Z	ICAO	MAP
017A	LATIN SMALL LETTER Z WITH ACUTE	ź	005A	Z	EXT	MAP
017B	LATIN CAPITAL LETTER Z WITH DOT ABOVE	Ż	005A	Z	ICAO	MAP
017C	LATIN SMALL LETTER Z WITH DOT ABOVE	ż	005A	Z	EXT	MAP
017D	LATIN CAPITAL LETTER Z WITH CARON	Ž	005A	Z	ICAO	MAP
017D 0326	LATIN CAPITAL LETTER Z WITH CARON WITH COMBINING COMMA BELOW	Ž̦	005A	Z	EXT	MAP
017D 0327	LATIN CAPITAL LETTER Z WITH CARON WITH COMBINING CEDILLA	Ž̧	005A	Z	EXT	MAP
017E	LATIN SMALL LETTER Z WITH CARON	ž	005A	Z	EXT	MAP
017E 0326	LATIN SMALL LETTER Z WITH CARON WITH COMBINING COMMA BELOW	ž̦	005A	Z	EXT	MAP
017E 0327	LATIN SMALL LETTER Z WITH CARON WITH COMBINING CEDILLA	ž̧	005A	Z	EXT	MAP
0187	LATIN CAPITAL LETTER C WITH HOOK	Ƈ	0043	C	EXT	MAP
0188	LATIN SMALL LETTER C WITH HOOK	ƈ	0043	C	EXT	MAP
018F	LATIN CAPITAL LETTER SCHWA	Ə	0045	E	EXT	MAP
0197	LATIN CAPITAL LETTER I WITH STROKE	Ɨ	0049	I	EXT	MAP
01A0	LATIN CAPITAL LETTER O WITH HORN	Ơ	004F	O	EXT	MAP
01A1	LATIN SMALL LETTER O WITH HORN	ơ	004F	O	EXT	MAP
01AF	LATIN CAPITAL LETTER U WITH HORN	Ư	0055	U	EXT	MAP
01B0	LATIN SMALL LETTER U WITH HORN	ư	0055	U	EXT	MAP
01B7	LATIN CAPITAL LETTER EZH	Ʒ	005A	Z	EXT	MAP
01CD	LATIN CAPITAL LETTER A WITH CARON	Ǎ	0041	A	EXT	MAP
01CE	LATIN SMALL LETTER A WITH CARON	ǎ	0041	A	EXT	MAP
01CF	LATIN CAPITAL LETTER I WITH CARON	Ǐ	0049	I	EXT	MAP
01D0	LATIN SMALL LETTER I WITH CARON	ǐ	0049	I	EXT	MAP
01D1	LATIN CAPITAL LETTER O WITH CARON	Ǒ	004F	O	EXT	MAP
01D2	LATIN SMALL LETTER O WITH CARON	ǒ	004F	O	EXT	MAP
01D3	LATIN CAPITAL LETTER U WITH CARON	Ǔ	0055	U	EXT	MAP
01D4	LATIN SMALL LETTER U WITH CARON	ǔ	0055	U	EXT	MAP
01D5	LATIN CAPITAL LETTER U WITH DIAERESIS AND MACRON	Ǖ	0055 0045	UE	EXT	MAP
01D6	LATIN SMALL LETTER U WITH DIAERESIS AND MACRON	ǖ	0055 0045	UE	EXT	MAP
01D7	LATIN CAPITAL LETTER U WITH DIAERESIS AND ACUTE	Ǘ	0055 0045	UE	EXT	MAP
01D8	LATIN SMALL LETTER U WITH DIAERESIS AND ACUTE	ǘ	0055 0045	UE	EXT	MAP
01D9	LATIN CAPITAL LETTER U WITH DIAERESIS AND CARON	Ǚ	0055 0045	UE	EXT	MAP
01DA	LATIN SMALL LETTER U WITH DIAERESIS AND CARON	ǚ	0055 0045	UE	EXT	MAP
01DB	LATIN CAPITAL LETTER U WITH DIAERESIS AND GRAVE	Ǜ	0055 0045	UE	EXT	MAP
01DC	LATIN SMALL LETTER U WITH DIAERESIS AND GRAVE	ǜ	0055 0045	UE	EXT	MAP
01DE	LATIN CAPITAL LETTER A WITH DIAERESIS AND MACRON	Ǟ	0041 0045	AE	EXT	MAP
01DF	LATIN SMALL LETTER A WITH DIAERESIS AND MACRON	ǟ	0041 0045	AE	EXT	MAP
01E2	LATIN CAPITAL LETTER AE WITH MACRON	Ǣ	0041 0045	AE	EXT	MAP
01E3	LATIN SMALL LETTER AE WITH MACRON	ǣ	0041 0045	AE	EXT	MAP
01E4	LATIN CAPITAL LETTER G WITH STROKE	Ǥ	0047	G	EXT	MAP
01E5	LATIN SMALL LETTER G WITH STROKE	ǥ	0047	G	EXT	MAP
01E6	LATIN CAPITAL LETTER G WITH CARON	Ǧ	0047	G	EXT	MAP
01E7	LATIN SMALL LETTER G WITH CARON	ǧ	0047	G	EXT	MAP
01E8	LATIN CAPITAL LETTER K WITH CARON	Ǩ	004B	K	EXT	MAP
01E9	LATIN SMALL LETTER K WITH CARON	ǩ	004B	K	EXT	MAP
01EA	LATIN CAPITAL LETTER O WITH OGONEK	Ǫ	004F	O	EXT	MAP
01EB	LATIN SMALL LETTER O WITH OGONEK	ǫ	004F	O	EXT	MAP
01EC	LATIN CAPITAL LETTER O WITH OGONEK AND MACRON	Ǭ	004F	O	EXT	MAP
01ED	LATIN SMALL LETTER O WITH OGONEK AND MACRON	ǭ	004F	O	EXT	MAP
01EE	LATIN CAPITAL LETTER EZH WITH CARON	Ǯ	005A	Z	EXT	MAP
01EF	LATIN SMALL LETTER EZH WITH CARON	ǯ	005A	Z	EXT	MAP
01F0	LATIN SMALL LETTER J WITH CARON	ǰ	004A	J	EXT	MAP
01F4	LATIN CAPITAL LETTER G WITH ACUTE	Ǵ	0047	G	EXT	MAP
01F5	LATIN SMALL LETTER G WITH ACUTE	ǵ	0047	G	EXT	MAP
01F8	LATIN CAPITAL LETTER N WITH GRAVE	Ǹ	004E	N	EXT	MAP
01F9	LATIN SMALL LETTER N WITH GRAVE	ǹ	004E	N	EXT	MAP
01FA	LATIN CAPITAL LETTER A WITH RING ABOVE AND ACUTE	Ǻ	0041 0041	AA	EXT	MAP
01FB	LATIN SMALL LETTER A WITH RING ABOVE AND ACUTE	ǻ	0041 0041	AA	EXT	MAP
01FC	LATIN CAPITAL LETTER AE WITH ACUTE	Ǽ	0041 0045	AE	EXT	MAP
01FD	LATIN SMALL LETTER AE WITH ACUTE	ǽ	0041 0045	AE	EXT	MAP
01FE	LATIN CAPITAL LETTER O WITH STROKE AND ACUTE	Ǿ	004F 0045	OE	EXT	MAP
01FF	LATIN SMALL LETTER O WITH STROKE AND ACUTE	ǿ	004F 0045	OE	EXT	MAP
0212	LATIN CAPITAL LETTER R WITH INVERTED BREVE	Ȓ	0052	R	EXT	MAP
0213	LATIN SMALL LETTER R WITH INVERTED BREVE	ȓ	0052	R	EXT	MAP
0218	LATIN CAPITAL LETTER S WITH COMMA BELOW	Ș	0053	S	EXT	MAP
0219	LATIN SMALL LETTER S WITH COMMA BELOW	ș	0053	S	EXT	MAP
021A	LATIN CAPITAL LETTER T WITH COMMA BELOW	Ț	0054	T	EXT	MAP
021B	LATIN SMALL LETTER T WITH COMMA BELOW	ț	0054	T	EXT	MAP
021E	LATIN CAPITAL LETTER H WITH CARON	Ȟ	0048	H	EXT	MAP
021F	LATIN SMALL LETTER H WITH CARON	ȟ	0048	H	EXT	MAP
0227	LATIN SMALL LETTER A WITH DOT ABOVE	ȧ	0041	A	EXT	MAP
0228	LATIN CAPITAL LETTER E WITH CEDILLA	Ȩ	0045	E	EXT	MAP
0229	LATIN SMALL LETTER E WITH CEDILLA	ȩ	0045	E	EXT	MAP
022A	LATIN CAPITAL LETTER O WITH DIAERESIS AND MACRON	Ȫ	004F 0045	OE	EXT	MAP
022B	LATIN SMALL LETTER O WITH DIAERESIS AND MACRON	ȫ	004F 0045	OE	EXT	MAP
022C	LATIN CAPITAL LETTER O WITH TILDE AND MACRON	Ȭ	004F	O	EXT	MAP
022D	LATIN SMALL LETTER O WITH TILDE AND MACRON	ȭ	004F	O	EXT	MAP
022E	LATIN CAPITAL LETTER O WITH DOT ABOVE	Ȯ	004F	O	EXT	MAP
022F	LATIN SMALL LETTER O WITH DOT ABOVE	ȯ	004F	O	EXT	MAP
0230	LATIN CAPITAL LETTER O WITH DOT ABOVE AND MACRON	Ȱ	004F	O	EXT	MAP
0231	LATIN SMALL LETTER O WITH DOT ABOVE AND MACRON	ȱ	004F	O	EXT	MAP
0232	LATIN CAPITAL LETTER Y WITH MACRON	Ȳ	0059	Y	EXT	MAP
0233	LATIN SMALL LETTER Y WITH MACRON	ȳ	0059	Y	EXT	MAP
0259	LATIN SMALL LETTER SCHWA	ə	0045	E	EXT	MAP
0268	LATIN SMALL LETTER I WITH STROKE	ɨ	0049	I	EXT	MAP
0292	LATIN SMALL LETTER EZH	ʒ	005A	Z	EXT	MAP
1E02	LATIN CAPITAL LETTER B WITH DOT ABOVE	Ḃ	0042	B	EXT	MAP
1E03	LATIN SMALL LETTER B WITH DOT ABOVE	ḃ	0042	B	EXT	MAP
1E06	LATIN CAPITAL LETTER B WITH LINE BELOW	Ḇ	0042	B	EXT	MAP
1E07	LATIN SMALL LETTER B WITH LINE BELOW	ḇ	0042	B	EXT	MAP
1E0A	LATIN CAPITAL LETTER D WITH DOT ABOVE	Ḋ	0044	D	EXT	MAP
1E0B	LATIN SMALL LETTER D WITH DOT ABOVE	ḋ	0044	D	EXT	MAP
1E0C	LATIN CAPITAL LETTER D WITH DOT BELOW	Ḍ	0044	D	EXT	MAP
1E0D	LATIN SMALL LETTER D WITH DOT BELOW	ḍ	0044	D	EXT	MAP
1E0E	LATIN CAPITAL LETTER D WITH LINE BELOW	Ḏ	0044	D	EXT	MAP
1E0F	LATIN SMALL LETTER D WITH LINE BELOW	ḏ	0044	D	EXT	MAP
1E10	LATIN CAPITAL LETTER D WITH CEDILLA	Ḑ	0044	D	EXT	MAP
1E11	LATIN SMALL LETTER D WITH CEDILLA	ḑ	0044	D	EXT	MAP
1E17	LATIN SMALL LETTER E WITH MACRON AND ACUTE	ḗ	0045	E	EXT	MAP
1E1C	LATIN CAPITAL LETTER E WITH CEDILLA AND BREVE	Ḝ	0045	E	EXT	MAP
1E1D	LATIN SMALL LETTER E WITH CEDILLA AND BREVE	ḝ	0045	E	EXT	MAP
1E1E	LATIN CAPITAL LETTER F WITH DOT ABOVE	Ḟ	0046	F	EXT	MAP
1E1F	LATIN SMALL LETTER F WITH DOT ABOVE	ḟ	0046	F	EXT	MAP
1E20	LATIN CAPITAL LETTER G WITH MACRON	Ḡ	0047	G	EXT	MAP
1E21	LATIN SMALL LETTER G WITH MACRON	ḡ	0047	G	EXT	MAP
1E22	LATIN CAPITAL LETTER H WITH DOT ABOVE	Ḣ	0048	H	EXT	MAP
1E23	LATIN SMALL LETTER H WITH DOT ABOVE	ḣ	0048	H	EXT	MAP
1E24	LATIN CAPITAL LETTER H WITH DOT BELOW	Ḥ	0048	H	EXT	MAP
1E25	LATIN SMALL LETTER H WITH DOT BELOW	ḥ	0048	H	EXT	MAP
1E26	LATIN CAPITAL LETTER H WITH DIAERESIS	Ḧ	0048	H	EXT	MAP
1E27	LATIN SMALL LETTER H WITH DIAERESIS	ḧ	0048	H	EXT	MAP
1E28	LATIN CAPITAL LETTER H WITH CEDILLA	Ḩ	0048	H	EXT	MAP
1E29	LATIN SMALL LETTER H WITH CEDILLA	ḩ	0048	H	EXT	MAP
1E2A	LATIN CAPITAL LETTER H WITH BREVE BELOW	Ḫ	0048	H	EXT	MAP
1E2B	LATIN SMALL LETTER H WITH BREVE BELOW	ḫ	0048	H	EXT	MAP
1E2F	LATIN SMALL LETTER I WITH DIAERESIS AND ACUTE	ḯ	0049	I	EXT	MAP
1E30	LATIN CAPITAL LETTER K WITH ACUTE	Ḱ	004B	K	EXT	MAP
1E31	LATIN SMALL LETTER K WITH ACUTE	ḱ	004B	K	EXT	MAP
1E32	LATIN CAPITAL LETTER K WITH DOT BELOW	Ḳ	004B	K	EXT	MAP
1E32 0304	LATIN CAPITAL LETTER K WITH DOT BELOW WITH COMBINING MACRON	Ḳ̄	004B	K	EXT	MAP
1E33	LATIN SMALL LETTER K WITH DOT BELOW	ḳ	004B	K	EXT	MAP
1E33 0304	LATIN SMALL LETTER K WITH DOT BELOW WITH COMBINING MACRON	ḳ̄	004B	K	EXT	MAP
1E34	LATIN CAPITAL LETTER K WITH LINE BELOW	Ḵ	004B	K	EXT	MAP
1E35	LATIN SMALL LETTER K WITH LINE BELOW	ḵ	004B	K	EXT	MAP
1E36	LATIN CAPITAL LETTER L WITH DOT BELOW	Ḷ	004C	L	EXT	MAP
1E37	LATIN SMALL LETTER L WITH DOT BELOW	ḷ	004C	L	EXT	MAP
1E3A	LATIN CAPITAL LETTER L WITH LINE BELOW	Ḻ	004C	L	EXT	MAP
1E3B	LATIN SMALL LETTER L WITH LINE BELOW	ḻ	004C	L	EXT	MAP
1E40	LATIN CAPITAL LETTER M WITH DOT ABOVE	Ṁ	004D	M	EXT	MAP
1E41	LATIN SMALL LETTER M WITH DOT ABOVE	ṁ	004D	M	EXT	MAP
1E42	LATIN CAPITAL LETTER M WITH DOT BELOW	Ṃ	004D	M	EXT	MAP
1E43	LATIN SMALL LETTER M WITH DOT BELOW	ṃ	004D	M	EXT	MAP
1E44	LATIN CAPITAL LETTER N WITH DOT ABOVE	Ṅ	004E	N	EXT	MAP
1E45	LATIN SMALL LETTER N WITH DOT ABOVE	ṅ	004E	N	EXT	MAP
1E46	LATIN CAPITAL LETTER N WITH DOT BELOW	Ṇ	004E	N	EXT	MAP
1E47	LATIN SMALL LETTER N WITH DOT BELOW	ṇ	004E	N	EXT	MAP
1E48	LATIN CAPITAL LETTER N WITH LINE BELOW	Ṉ	004E	N	EXT	MAP
1E49	LATIN SMALL LETTER N WITH LINE BELOW	ṉ	004E	N	EXT	MAP
1E52	LATIN CAPITAL LETTER O WITH MACRON AND ACUTE	Ṓ	004F	O	EXT	MAP
1E53	LATIN SMALL LETTER O WITH MACRON AND ACUTE	ṓ	004F	O	EXT	MAP
1E54	LATIN CAPITAL LETTER P WITH ACUTE	Ṕ	0050	P	EXT	MAP
1E55	LATIN SMALL LETTER P WITH ACUTE	ṕ	0050	P	EXT	MAP
1E56	LATIN CAPITAL LETTER P WITH DOT ABOVE	Ṗ	0050	P	EXT	MAP
1E57	LATIN SMALL LETTER P WITH DOT ABOVE	ṗ	0050	P	EXT	MAP
1E58	LATIN CAPITAL LETTER R WITH DOT ABOVE	Ṙ	0052	R	EXT	MAP
1E59	LATIN SMALL LETTER R WITH DOT ABOVE	ṙ	0052	R	EXT	MAP
1E5A	LATIN CAPITAL LETTER R WITH DOT BELOW	Ṛ	0052	R	EXT	MAP
1E5B	LATIN SMALL LETTER R WITH DOT BELOW	ṛ	0052	R	EXT	MAP
1E5E	LATIN CAPITAL LETTER R WITH LINE BELOW	Ṟ	0052	R	EXT	MAP
1E5F	LATIN SMALL LETTER R WITH LINE BELOW	ṟ	0052	R	EXT	MAP
1E60	LATIN CAPITAL LETTER S WITH DOT ABOVE	Ṡ	0053	S	EXT	MAP
1E61	LATIN SMALL LETTER S WITH DOT ABOVE	ṡ	0053	S	EXT	MAP
1E62	LATIN CAPITAL LETTER S WITH DOT BELOW	Ṣ	0053	S	EXT	MAP
1E62 0304	LATIN CAPITAL LETTER S WITH DOT BELOW WITH COMBINING MACRON	Ṣ̄	0053	S	EXT	MAP
1E63	LATIN SMALL LETTER S WITH DOT BELOW	ṣ	0053	S	EXT	MAP
1E63 0304	LATIN SMALL LETTER S WITH DOT BELOW WITH COMBINING MACRON	ṣ̄	0053	S	EXT	MAP
1E6A	LATIN CAPITAL LETTER T WITH DOT ABOVE	Ṫ	0054	T	EXT	MAP
1E6B	LATIN SMALL LETTER T WITH DOT ABOVE	ṫ	0054	T	EXT	MAP
1E6C	LATIN CAPITAL LETTER T WITH DOT BELOW	Ṭ	0054	T	EXT	MAP
1E6C 0304	LATIN CAPITAL LETTER T WITH DOT BELOW WITH COMBINING MACRON	Ṭ̄	0054	T	EXT	MAP
1E6D	LATIN SMALL LETTER T WITH DOT BELOW	ṭ	0054	T	EXT	MAP
1E6D 0304	LATIN SMALL LETTER T WITH DOT BELOW WITH COMBINING MACRON	ṭ̄	0054	T	EXT	MAP
1E6E	LATIN CAPITAL LETTER T WITH LINE BELOW	Ṯ	0054	T	EXT	MAP
1E6F	LATIN SMALL LETTER T WITH LINE BELOW	ṯ	0054	T	EXT	MAP
1E80	LATIN CAPITAL LETTER W WITH GRAVE	Ẁ	0057	W	EXT	MAP
1E81	LATIN SMALL LETTER W WITH GRAVE	ẁ	0057	W	EXT	MAP
1E82	LATIN CAPITAL LETTER W WITH ACUTE	Ẃ	0057	W	EXT	MAP
1E83	LATIN SMALL LETTER W WITH ACUTE	ẃ	0057	W	EXT	MAP
1E84	LATIN CAPITAL LETTER W WITH DIAERESIS	Ẅ	0057	W	EXT	MAP
1E85	LATIN SMALL LETTER W WITH DIAERESIS	ẅ	0057	W	EXT	MAP
1E86	LATIN CAPITAL LETTER W WITH DOT ABOVE	Ẇ	0057	W	EXT	MAP
1E87	LATIN SMALL LETTER W WITH DOT ABOVE	ẇ	0057	W	EXT	MAP
1E8C	LATIN CAPITAL LETTER X WITH DIAERESIS	Ẍ	0058	X	EXT	MAP
1E8D	LATIN SMALL LETTER X WITH DIAERESIS	ẍ	0058	X	EXT	MAP
1E8E	LATIN CAPITAL LETTER Y WITH DOT ABOVE	Ẏ	0059	Y	EXT	MAP
1E8F	LATIN SMALL LETTER Y WITH DOT ABOVE	ẏ	0059	Y	EXT	MAP
1E90	LATIN CAPITAL LETTER Z WITH CIRCUMFLEX	Ẑ	005A	Z	EXT	MAP
1E91	LATIN SMALL LETTER Z WITH CIRCUMFLEX	ẑ	005A	Z	EXT	MAP
1E92	LATIN CAPITAL LETTER Z WITH DOT BELOW	Ẓ	005A	Z	EXT	MAP
1E93	LATIN SMALL LETTER Z WITH DOT BELOW	ẓ	005A	Z	EXT	MAP
1E94	LATIN CAPITAL LETTER Z WITH LINE BELOW	Ẕ	005A	Z	EXT	MAP
1E95	LATIN SMALL LETTER Z WITH LINE BELOW	ẕ	005A	Z	EXT	MAP
1E96	LATIN SMALL LETTER H WITH LINE BELOW	ẖ	0048	H	EXT	MAP
1E97	LATIN SMALL LETTER T WITH DIAERESIS	ẗ	0054	T	EXT	MAP
1E9E	LATIN CAPITAL LETTER SHARP S	ẞ	0053 0053	SS	EXT	MAP
1EA0	LATIN CAPITAL LETTER A WITH DOT BELOW	Ạ	0041	A	EXT	MAP
1EA0 0308	LATIN CAPITAL LETTER A WITH DOT BELOW WITH COMBINING DIAERESIS	Ạ̈	0041 0045	AE	EXT	MAP
1EA1	LATIN SMALL LETTER A WITH DOT BELOW	ạ	0041	A	EXT	MAP
1EA1 0308	LATIN SMALL LETTER A WITH DOT BELOW WITH COMBINING DIAERESIS	ạ̈	0041 0045	AE	EXT	MAP
1EA2	LATIN CAPITAL LETTER A WITH HOOK ABOVE	Ả	0041	A	EXT	MAP
1EA3	LATIN SMALL LETTER A WITH HOOK ABOVE	ả	0041	A	EXT	MAP
1EA4	LATIN CAPITAL LETTER A WITH CIRCUMFLEX AND ACUTE	Ấ	0041	A	EXT	MAP
1EA5	LATIN SMALL LETTER A WITH CIRCUMFLEX AND ACUTE	ấ	0041	A	EXT	MAP
1EA6	LATIN CAPITAL LETTER A WITH CIRCUMFLEX AND GRAVE	Ầ	0041	A	EXT	MAP
1EA7	LATIN SMALL LETTER A WITH CIRCUMFLEX AND GRAVE	ầ	0041	A	EXT	MAP
1EA8	LATIN CAPITAL LETTER A WITH CIRCUMFLEX AND HOOK ABOVE	Ẩ	0041	A	EXT	MAP
1EA9	LATIN SMALL LETTER A WITH CIRCUMFLEX AND HOOK ABOVE	ẩ	0041	A	EXT	MAP
1EAA	LATIN CAPITAL LETTER A WITH CIRCUMFLEX AND TILDE	Ẫ	0041	A	EXT	MAP
1EAB	LATIN SMALL LETTER A WITH CIRCUMFLEX AND TILDE	ẫ	0041	A	EXT	MAP
1EAC	LATIN CAPITAL LETTER A WITH CIRCUMFLEX AND DOT BELOW	Ậ	0041	A	EXT	MAP
1EAD	LATIN SMALL LETTER A WITH CIRCUMFLEX AND DOT BELOW	ậ	0041	A	EXT	MAP
1EAE	LATIN CAPITAL LETTER A WITH BREVE AND ACUTE	Ắ	0041	A	EXT	MAP
1EAF	LATIN SMALL LETTER A WITH BREVE AND ACUTE	ắ	0041	A	EXT	MAP
1EB0	LATIN CAPITAL LETTER A WITH BREVE AND GRAVE	Ằ	0041	A	EXT	MAP
1EB1	LATIN SMALL LETTER A WITH BREVE AND GRAVE	ằ	0041	A	EXT	MAP
1EB2	LATIN CAPITAL LETTER A WITH BREVE AND HOOK ABOVE	Ẳ	0041	A	EXT	MAP
1EB3	LATIN SMALL LETTER A WITH BREVE AND HOOK ABOVE	ẳ	0041	A	EXT	MAP
1EB4	LATIN CAPITAL LETTER A WITH BREVE AND TILDE	Ẵ	0041	A	EXT	MAP
1EB5	LATIN SMALL LETTER A WITH BREVE AND TILDE	ẵ	0041	A	EXT	MAP
1EB6	LATIN CAPITAL LETTER A WITH BREVE AND DOT BELOW	Ặ	0041	A	EXT	MAP
1EB7	LATIN SMALL LETTER A WITH BREVE AND DOT BELOW	ặ	0041	A	EXT	MAP
1EB8	LATIN CAPITAL LETTER E WITH DOT BELOW	Ẹ	0045	E	EXT	MAP
1EB9	LATIN SMALL LETTER E WITH DOT BELOW	ẹ	0045	E	EXT	MAP
1EBA	LATIN CAPITAL LETTER E WITH HOOK ABOVE	Ẻ	0045	E	EXT	MAP
1EBB	LATIN SMALL LETTER E WITH HOOK ABOVE	ẻ	0045	E	EXT	MAP
1EBC	LATIN CAPITAL LETTER E WITH TILDE	Ẽ	0045	E	EXT	MAP
1EBD	LATIN SMALL LETTER E WITH TILDE	ẽ	0045	E	EXT	MAP
1EBE	LATIN CAPITAL LETTER E WITH CIRCUMFLEX AND ACUTE	Ế	0045	E	EXT	MAP
1EBF	LATIN SMALL LETTER E WITH CIRCUMFLEX AND ACUTE	ế	0045	E	EXT	MAP
1EC0	LATIN CAPITAL LETTER E WITH CIRCUMFLEX AND GRAVE	Ề	0045	E	EXT	MAP
1EC1	LATIN SMALL LETTER E WITH CIRCUMFLEX AND GRAVE	ề	0045	E	EXT	MAP
1EC2	LATIN CAPITAL LETTER E WITH CIRCUMFLEX AND HOOK ABOVE	Ể	0045	E	EXT	MAP
1EC3	LATIN SMALL LETTER E WITH CIRCUMFLEX AND HOOK ABOVE	ể	0045	E	EXT	MAP
1EC4	LATIN CAPITAL LETTER E WITH CIRCUMFLEX AND TILDE	Ễ	0045	E	EXT	MAP
1EC5	LATIN SMALL LETTER E WITH CIRCUMFLEX AND TILDE	ễ	0045	E	EXT	MAP
1EC6	LATIN CAPITAL LETTER E WITH CIRCUMFLEX AND DOT BELOW	Ệ	0045	E	EXT	MAP
1EC7	LATIN SMALL LETTER E WITH CIRCUMFLEX AND DOT BELOW	ệ	0045	E	EXT	MAP
1EC8	LATIN CAPITAL LETTER I WITH HOOK ABOVE	Ỉ	0049	I	EXT	MAP
1EC9	LATIN SMALL LETTER I WITH HOOK ABOVE	ỉ	0049	I	EXT	MAP
1ECA	LATIN CAPITAL LETTER I WITH DOT BELOW	Ị	0049	I	EXT	MAP
1ECB	LATIN SMALL LETTER I WITH DOT BELOW	ị	0049	I	EXT	MAP
1ECC	LATIN CAPITAL LETTER O WITH DOT BELOW	Ọ	004F	O	EXT	MAP
1ECC 0308	LATIN CAPITAL LETTER O WITH DOT BELOW WITH COMBINING DIAERESIS	Ọ̈	004F 0045	OE	EXT	MAP
1ECD	LATIN SMALL LETTER O WITH DOT BELOW	ọ	004F	O	EXT	MAP
1ECD 0308	LATIN SMALL LETTER O WITH DOT BELOW WITH COMBINING DIAERESIS	ọ̈	004F 0045	OE	EXT	MAP
1ECE	LATIN CAPITAL LETTER O WITH HOOK ABOVE	Ỏ	004F	O	EXT	MAP
1ECF	LATIN SMALL LETTER O WITH HOOK ABOVE	ỏ	004F	O	EXT	MAP
1ED0	LATIN CAPITAL LETTER O WITH CIRCUMFLEX AND ACUTE	Ố	004F	O	EXT	MAP
1ED1	LATIN SMALL LETTER O WITH CIRCUMFLEX AND ACUTE	ố	004F	O	EXT	MAP
1ED2	LATIN CAPITAL LETTER O WITH CIRCUMFLEX AND GRAVE	Ồ	004F	O	EXT	MAP
1ED3	LATIN SMALL LETTER O WITH CIRCUMFLEX AND GRAVE	ồ	004F	O	EXT	MAP
1ED4	LATIN CAPITAL LETTER O WITH CIRCUMFLEX AND HOOK ABOVE	Ổ	004F	O	EXT	MAP
1ED5	LATIN SMALL LETTER O WITH CIRCUMFLEX AND HOOK ABOVE	ổ	004F	O	EXT	MAP
1ED6	LATIN CAPITAL LETTER O WITH CIRCUMFLEX AND TILDE	Ỗ	004F	O	EXT	MAP
1ED7	LATIN SMALL LETTER O WITH CIRCUMFLEX AND TILDE	ỗ	004F	O	EXT	MAP
1ED8	LATIN CAPITAL LETTER O WITH CIRCUMFLEX AND DOT BELOW	Ộ	004F	O	EXT	MAP
1ED9	LATIN SMALL LETTER O WITH CIRCUMFLEX AND DOT BELOW	ộ	004F	O	EXT	MAP
1EDA	LATIN CAPITAL LETTER O WITH HORN AND ACUTE	Ớ	004F	O	EXT	MAP
1EDB	LATIN SMALL LETTER O WITH HORN AND ACUTE	ớ	004F	O	EXT	MAP
1EDC	LATIN CAPITAL LETTER O WITH HORN AND GRAVE	Ờ	004F	O	EXT	MAP
1EDD	LATIN SMALL LETTER O WITH HORN AND GRAVE	ờ	004F	O	EXT	MAP
1EDE	LATIN CAPITAL LETTER O WITH HORN AND HOOK ABOVE	Ở	004F	O	EXT	MAP
1EDF	LATIN SMALL LETTER O WITH HORN AND HOOK ABOVE	ở	004F	O	EXT	MAP
1EE0	LATIN CAPITAL LETTER O WITH HORN AND TILDE	Ỡ	004F	O	EXT	MAP
1EE1	LATIN SMALL LETTER O WITH HORN AND TILDE	ỡ	004F	O	EXT	MAP
1EE2	LATIN CAPITAL LETTER O WITH HORN AND DOT BELOW	Ợ	004F	O	EXT	MAP
1EE3	LATIN SMALL LETTER O WITH HORN AND DOT BELOW	ợ	004F	O	EXT	MAP
1EE4	LATIN CAPITAL LETTER U WITH DOT BELOW	Ụ	0055	U	EXT	MAP
1EE4 0304	LATIN CAPITAL LETTER U WITH DOT BELOW WITH COMBINING MACRON	Ụ̄	0055	U	EXT	MAP
1EE4 0308	LATIN CAPITAL LETTER U WITH DOT BELOW WITH COMBINING DIAERESIS	Ụ̈	0055 0045	UE	EXT	MAP
1EE5	LATIN SMALL LETTER U WITH DOT BELOW	ụ	0055	U	EXT	MAP
1EE5 0304	LATIN SMALL LETTER U WITH DOT BELOW WITH COMBINING MACRON	ụ̄	0055	U	EXT	MAP
1EE5 0308	LATIN SMALL LETTER U WITH DOT BELOW WITH COMBINING DIAERESIS	ụ̈	0055 0045	UE	EXT	MAP
1EE6	LATIN CAPITAL LETTER U WITH HOOK ABOVE	Ủ	0055	U	EXT	MAP
1EE7	LATIN SMALL LETTER U WITH HOOK ABOVE	ủ	0055	U	EXT	MAP
1EE8	LATIN CAPITAL LETTER U WITH HORN AND ACUTE	Ứ	0055	U	EXT	MAP
1EE9	LATIN SMALL LETTER U WITH HORN AND ACUTE	ứ	0055	U	EXT	MAP
1EEA	LATIN CAPITAL LETTER U WITH HORN AND GRAVE	Ừ	0055	U	EXT	MAP
1EEB	LATIN SMALL LETTER U WITH HORN AND GRAVE	ừ	0055	U	EXT	MAP
1EEC	LATIN CAPITAL LETTER U WITH HORN AND HOOK ABOVE	Ử	0055	U	EXT	MAP
1EED	LATIN SMALL LETTER U WITH HORN AND HOOK ABOVE	ử	0055	U	EXT	MAP
1EEE	LATIN CAPITAL LETTER U WITH HORN AND TILDE	Ữ	0055	U	EXT	MAP
1EEF	LATIN SMALL LETTER U WITH HORN AND TILDE	ữ	0055	U	EXT	MAP
1EF0	LATIN CAPITAL LETTER U WITH HORN AND DOT BELOW	Ự	0055	U	EXT	MAP
1EF1	LATIN SMALL LETTER U WITH HORN AND DOT BELOW	ự	0055	U	EXT	MAP
1EF2	LATIN CAPITAL LETTER Y WITH GRAVE	Ỳ	0059	Y	EXT	MAP
1EF3	LATIN SMALL LETTER Y WITH GRAVE	ỳ	0059	Y	EXT	MAP
1EF4	LATIN CAPITAL LETTER Y WITH DOT BELOW	Ỵ	0059	Y	EXT	MAP
1EF5	LATIN SMALL LETTER Y WITH DOT BELOW	ỵ	0059	Y	EXT	MAP
1EF6	LATIN CAPITAL LETTER Y WITH HOOK ABOVE	Ỷ	0059	Y	EXT	MAP
1EF7	LATIN SMALL LETTER Y WITH HOOK ABOVE	ỷ	0059	Y	EXT	MAP
1EF8	LATIN CAPITAL LETTER Y WITH TILDE	Ỹ	0059	Y	EXT	MAP
1EF9	LATIN SMALL LETTER Y WITH TILDE	ỹ	0059	Y	EXT	MAP

== Informative part ==
=== Extended letters ===
Each conforming IT system should be able to handle the extended letters for all name fields. This includes the collection, storage, transmission, display, and printout.

==== Greek letters (gl) ====
For cross-border data exchange, every IT system should support Greek letters in name fields.

Table: Greek Letters (gl)
Code points	Name	Glyph
0386	GREEK CAPITAL LETTER ALPHA WITH TONOS	Ά
0388	GREEK CAPITAL LETTER EPSILON WITH TONOS	Έ
0389	GREEK CAPITAL LETTER ETA WITH TONOS	Ή
038A	GREEK CAPITAL LETTER IOTA WITH TONOS	Ί
038C	GREEK CAPITAL LETTER OMICRON WITH TONOS	Ό
038E	GREEK CAPITAL LETTER UPSILON WITH TONOS	Ύ
038F	GREEK CAPITAL LETTER OMEGA WITH TONOS	Ώ
0390	GREEK SMALL LETTER IOTA WITH DIALYTIKA AND TONOS	ΐ
0391	GREEK CAPITAL LETTER ALPHA	Α
0392	GREEK CAPITAL LETTER BETA	Β
0393	GREEK CAPITAL LETTER GAMMA	Γ
0394	GREEK CAPITAL LETTER DELTA	Δ
0395	GREEK CAPITAL LETTER EPSILON	Ε
0396	GREEK CAPITAL LETTER ZETA	Ζ
0397	GREEK CAPITAL LETTER ETA	Η
0398	GREEK CAPITAL LETTER THETA	Θ
0399	GREEK CAPITAL LETTER IOTA	Ι
039A	GREEK CAPITAL LETTER KAPPA	Κ
039B	GREEK CAPITAL LETTER LAMDA	Λ
039C	GREEK CAPITAL LETTER MU	Μ
039D	GREEK CAPITAL LETTER NU	Ν
039E	GREEK CAPITAL LETTER XI	Ξ
039F	GREEK CAPITAL LETTER OMICRON	Ο
03A0	GREEK CAPITAL LETTER PI	Π
03A1	GREEK CAPITAL LETTER RHO	Ρ
03A3	GREEK CAPITAL LETTER SIGMA	Σ
03A4	GREEK CAPITAL LETTER TAU	Τ
03A5	GREEK CAPITAL LETTER UPSILON	Υ
03A6	GREEK CAPITAL LETTER PHI	Φ
03A7	GREEK CAPITAL LETTER CHI	Χ
03A8	GREEK CAPITAL LETTER PSI	Ψ
03A9	GREEK CAPITAL LETTER OMEGA	Ω
03AA	GREEK CAPITAL LETTER IOTA WITH DIALYTIKA	Ϊ
03AB	GREEK CAPITAL LETTER UPSILON WITH DIALYTIKA	Ϋ
03AC	GREEK SMALL LETTER ALPHA WITH TONOS	ά
03AD	GREEK SMALL LETTER EPSILON WITH TONOS	έ
03AE	GREEK SMALL LETTER ETA WITH TONOS	ή
03AF	GREEK SMALL LETTER IOTA WITH TONOS	ί
03B0	GREEK SMALL LETTER UPSILON WITH DIALYTIKA AND TONOS	ΰ
03B1	GREEK SMALL LETTER ALPHA	α
03B2	GREEK SMALL LETTER BETA	β
03B3	GREEK SMALL LETTER GAMMA	γ
03B4	GREEK SMALL LETTER DELTA	δ
03B5	GREEK SMALL LETTER EPSILON	ε
03B6	GREEK SMALL LETTER ZETA	ζ
03B7	GREEK SMALL LETTER ETA	η
03B8	GREEK SMALL LETTER THETA	θ
03B9	GREEK SMALL LETTER IOTA	ι
03BA	GREEK SMALL LETTER KAPPA	κ
03BB	GREEK SMALL LETTER LAMDA	λ
03BC	GREEK SMALL LETTER MU	μ
03BD	GREEK SMALL LETTER NU	ν
03BE	GREEK SMALL LETTER XI	ξ
03BF	GREEK SMALL LETTER OMICRON	ο
03C0	GREEK SMALL LETTER PI	π
03C1	GREEK SMALL LETTER RHO	ρ
03C2	GREEK SMALL LETTER FINAL SIGMA	ς
03C3	GREEK SMALL LETTER SIGMA	σ
03C4	GREEK SMALL LETTER TAU	τ
03C5	GREEK SMALL LETTER UPSILON	υ
03C6	GREEK SMALL LETTER PHI	φ
03C7	GREEK SMALL LETTER CHI	χ
03C8	GREEK SMALL LETTER PSI	ψ
03C9	GREEK SMALL LETTER OMEGA	ω
03CA	GREEK SMALL LETTER IOTA WITH DIALYTIKA	ϊ
03CB	GREEK SMALL LETTER UPSILON WITH DIALYTIKA	ϋ
03CC	GREEK SMALL LETTER OMICRON WITH TONOS	ό
03CD	GREEK SMALL LETTER UPSILON WITH TONOS	ύ
03CE	GREEK SMALL LETTER OMEGA WITH TONOS	ώ

==== Cyrillic letters (cl) ====
For cross-border data exchange, every IT system should support Cyrillic letters in name fields for Bulgarian names.

Table: Cyrillic Letters (cl)
Code points	Name	Glyph
040D	CYRILLIC CAPITAL LETTER I WITH GRAVE	Ѝ
0410	CYRILLIC CAPITAL LETTER A	А
0411	CYRILLIC CAPITAL LETTER BE	Б
0412	CYRILLIC CAPITAL LETTER VE	В
0413	CYRILLIC CAPITAL LETTER GHE	Г
0414	CYRILLIC CAPITAL LETTER DE	Д
0415	CYRILLIC CAPITAL LETTER IE	Е
0416	CYRILLIC CAPITAL LETTER ZHE	Ж
0417	CYRILLIC CAPITAL LETTER ZE	З
0418	CYRILLIC CAPITAL LETTER I	И
0419	CYRILLIC CAPITAL LETTER SHORT I	Й
041A	CYRILLIC CAPITAL LETTER KA	К
041B	CYRILLIC CAPITAL LETTER EL	Л
041C	CYRILLIC CAPITAL LETTER EM	М
041D	CYRILLIC CAPITAL LETTER EN	Н
041E	CYRILLIC CAPITAL LETTER O	О
041F	CYRILLIC CAPITAL LETTER PE	П
0420	CYRILLIC CAPITAL LETTER ER	Р
0421	CYRILLIC CAPITAL LETTER ES	С
0422	CYRILLIC CAPITAL LETTER TE	Т
0423	CYRILLIC CAPITAL LETTER U	У
0424	CYRILLIC CAPITAL LETTER EF	Ф
0425	CYRILLIC CAPITAL LETTER HA	Х
0426	CYRILLIC CAPITAL LETTER TSE	Ц
0427	CYRILLIC CAPITAL LETTER CHE	Ч
0428	CYRILLIC CAPITAL LETTER SHA	Ш
0429	CYRILLIC CAPITAL LETTER SHCHA	Щ
042A	CYRILLIC CAPITAL LETTER HARD SIGN	Ъ
042C	CYRILLIC CAPITAL LETTER SOFT SIGN	Ь
042E	CYRILLIC CAPITAL LETTER YU	Ю
042F	CYRILLIC CAPITAL LETTER YA	Я
0430	CYRILLIC SMALL LETTER A	а
0431	CYRILLIC SMALL LETTER BE	б
0432	CYRILLIC SMALL LETTER VE	в
0433	CYRILLIC SMALL LETTER GHE	г
0434	CYRILLIC SMALL LETTER DE	д
0435	CYRILLIC SMALL LETTER IE	е
0436	CYRILLIC SMALL LETTER ZHE	ж
0437	CYRILLIC SMALL LETTER ZE	з
0438	CYRILLIC SMALL LETTER I	и
0439	CYRILLIC SMALL LETTER SHORT I	й
043A	CYRILLIC SMALL LETTER KA	к
043B	CYRILLIC SMALL LETTER EL	л
043C	CYRILLIC SMALL LETTER EM	м
043D	CYRILLIC SMALL LETTER EN	н
043E	CYRILLIC SMALL LETTER O	о
043F	CYRILLIC SMALL LETTER PE	п
0440	CYRILLIC SMALL LETTER ER	р
0441	CYRILLIC SMALL LETTER ES	с
0442	CYRILLIC SMALL LETTER TE	т
0443	CYRILLIC SMALL LETTER U	у
0444	CYRILLIC SMALL LETTER EF	ф
0445	CYRILLIC SMALL LETTER HA	х
0446	CYRILLIC SMALL LETTER TSE	ц
0447	CYRILLIC SMALL LETTER CHE	ч
0448	CYRILLIC SMALL LETTER SHA	ш
0449	CYRILLIC SMALL LETTER SHCHA	щ
044A	CYRILLIC SMALL LETTER HARD SIGN	ъ
044C	CYRILLIC SMALL LETTER SOFT SIGN	ь
044E	CYRILLIC SMALL LETTER YU	ю
044F	CYRILLIC SMALL LETTER YA	я
045D	CYRILLIC SMALL LETTER I WITH GRAVE	ѝ

==== Non-letters E1 (enl) ====
These letters should be supported for legal entity names and product names.

Table: Non-Letters E1 (enl)
Code points	Name	Glyph
0192	LATIN SMALL LETTER F WITH HOOK	ƒ
02B0	MODIFIER LETTER SMALL H	ʰ
02B3	MODIFIER LETTER SMALL R	ʳ
02C6	MODIFIER LETTER CIRCUMFLEX ACCENT	ˆ
02DC	SMALL TILDE	˜
02E2	MODIFIER LETTER SMALL S	ˢ
1D48	MODIFIER LETTER SMALL D	ᵈ
1D57	MODIFIER LETTER SMALL T	ᵗ
2018	LEFT SINGLE QUOTATION MARK	‘
201A	SINGLE LOW-9 QUOTATION MARK	‚
201C	LEFT DOUBLE QUOTATION MARK	“
201D	RIGHT DOUBLE QUOTATION MARK	”
201E	DOUBLE LOW-9 QUOTATION MARK	„
2020	DAGGER	†
2026	HORIZONTAL ELLIPSIS	…
2030	PER MILLE SIGN	‰
2032	PRIME	′
2033	DOUBLE PRIME	″
2039	SINGLE LEFT-POINTING ANGLE QUOTATION MARK	‹
203A	SINGLE RIGHT-POINTING ANGLE QUOTATION MARK	›
2070	SUPERSCRIPT ZERO	⁰
2074	SUPERSCRIPT FOUR	⁴
2075	SUPERSCRIPT FIVE	⁵
2076	SUPERSCRIPT SIX	⁶
2077	SUPERSCRIPT SEVEN	⁷
2078	SUPERSCRIPT EIGHT	⁸
2079	SUPERSCRIPT NINE	⁹
207F	SUPERSCRIPT LATIN SMALL LETTER N	ⁿ
2080	SUBSCRIPT ZERO	₀
2081	SUBSCRIPT ONE	₁
2082	SUBSCRIPT TWO	₂
2083	SUBSCRIPT THREE	₃
2084	SUBSCRIPT FOUR	₄
2085	SUBSCRIPT FIVE	₅
2086	SUBSCRIPT SIX	₆
2087	SUBSCRIPT SEVEN	₇
2088	SUBSCRIPT EIGHT	₈
2089	SUBSCRIPT NINE	₉
2122	TRADE MARK SIGN	™
221E	INFINITY	∞
2264	LESS-THAN OR EQUAL TO	≤
2265	GREATER-THAN OR EQUAL TO	≥

=== Technical data types (informative) ===
For information, technical data types are defined as subsets of the letters defined in the standard. These can be used for interface agreements, for technical checks or as a basis for creating your own data types. An implementation as an XML schema type is included in the din-91379-datatypes.xsd file attached to the standard. This implementation is also freely available under the CC BY-ND license as part of the XOEV library.

Table: Technical data types (informative)
Data type	Latin Letters (blla)	Non-Letters N1 (bnlreq)	Non-Letters N2 (bnl)	Non-Letters N3 (bnlopt)	Non-Letters N4 (bnlnot)	Greek Letters (gl)	Cyrillic Letters (cl)	Non-Letters E1 (enl)	Remark
A	+	+							Names of natural persons
B	+	+	+						Other names
C	+	+	+	+	+				All normative letters, and only these
D	+	+	+	+		+		+	Legal entity names and product names
E	+	+	+	+	+	+	+	+	All normative and extended letters, and only these

== Added letters ==
Compared to DIN SPEC 91379, some additional letters have been included, only two of these letters are not deprecated.

Table: Added Letters
Code points	Name	Glyph	State
0113 030D	LATIN SMALL LETTER E WITH MACRON WITH COMBINING VERTICAL LINE ABOVE	ē̍	deprecated
014D 030D	LATIN SMALL LETTER O WITH MACRON WITH COMBINING VERTICAL LINE ABOVE	ō̍	deprecated
1E17	LATIN SMALL LETTER E WITH MACRON AND ACUTE	ḗ	deprecated
030D	COMBINING VERTICAL LINE ABOVE	̍	deprecated
2032	PRIME	′	current
2033	DOUBLE PRIME	″	current

== Current state ==
Current results of the standardization process include the specification DIN SPEC 91379 in March 2019 and final DIN standard in August 2022. The CEN/TC 224/WG 19 working group is working on the further development of this standard into the European standard EN 00224284 in the 04301181 project. According to AFNOR norminfo the project started in Dec. 2024 with a design phase, in April 2026 a public inquiry should start and the publication of the standard is planned for Nov. 2027. As of October 2026, information regarding the project has disappeared from the AFNOR and DIN websites—its current status is unknown.

== Open-source software supporting DIN 91379 ==
- Free Java library for creating and editing PDF supporting DIN 91379:
  - OpenPDF
- Free converter from XSL formatting objects to PDF
  - Apache FOP
- Free Fonts for DIN 91379
  - Arimo
  - Noto Latin, Greek, Cyrillic, see also issue "Combining comma above right" at wrong position
  - Sudo coding font
- Free typesetting systems
  - LuaLateX
  - Typst, see also issue PDF with wrong ToUnicode table created for DIN 91379 sequences; extracted text wrong; not accessible #8767

== Related standards ==
=== Keyboard standard DIN 2137 ===
The German keyboard layouts E1 and E2 standardized in the DIN 2137-1 standard enable the entry of all characters listed in DIN 91379 except Cyrillic letters without recourse to their Unicode value or their decimal code. Achieving this was one of the main reasons for revising these keyboard layouts compared to the previous version DIN 2137-1:2018-12.

=== Character naming and spelling standard DIN 5009 ===
The version of DIN 5009:2022-06 “Word and information processing for office applications — Announcing and dictating of text and characters” published in May 2022 together with its supplement "Announcing, naming and keyboard input of special letters and characters" contains German-language names, spelling rules and spelling announcement words for all characters listed in DIN 91379 (except some outdated characters and the Greek and Cyrillic letters). This ensures that the characters can be reproduced correctly in oral communication (e.g. on the telephone).
