= Latin International keyboard layout =

Variant of the arrangement keyboard keys

The Latin International keyboard layout is a keyboard layout defined in the international standard ISO/IEC 9995-3:2026 "Latin International keyboard layout", which was published in January 2026. It enables the input of a large set of characters including diacritical marks, special Latin letters and punctuation marks used in other languages than English, and symbols needed for quality typography.

This standard defines several variants which apply to different hardware key arrangements with different placing of the function keys, while the keys assigned to character input are placed identically as far as possible. The variant "Latin International-A" resembles the common US keyboard layout as defined in the US standard ANSI INCITS X3.154-1988 (the widespread "ANSI QWERTY" layout), with the only exception that the key to the right of the space bar is used as an AltGr key instead of an Alt key, as it is common for many European and other keyboard layouts.

Thus, anyone familiar with the "ANSI QWERTY" layout can use the Latin International layout without having to learn new things, especially when touch-typing. They only have to learn new key combinations for the "new" characters that they actually want to use that were not on the "ANSI QWERTY" layout.

== Purpose ==
- All personal names and texts written in the national languages of all countries can be entered correctly (provided they use the Latin script).
- Common transliteration systems are supported, such as for Arabic, Chinese (Pinyin), Hebrew, Russian and other languages using the Cyrillic script, and Sanskrit.
- All characters used in "good typography" can be entered easily, like the em dash, the en dash, or the prime. Especially, the "comma-shaped apostrophe" gets a prominent position (being doubled as "closing single quote" which is allocated systematically with the other quotation marks).
- Furthermore, punctuation marks used in languages other than English are supported, as the different quotation marks used in different languages, or the reference mark ※ which is used in Japan also in English texts.
- The Latin script variants Fraktur (Blackletter) and Gaelic, which have some contemporary use despite their "old-fashioned" look, are supported (for environments which provide appropriate fonts and automatic ligating for Fraktur, which can be controlled by the "zero width non-joiner").
- Symbols used commonly in business texts are provided, like ¥, £, €, ®, ™, or ⌀ (diameter).

== Scope ==
=== Depiction and general description of the layout ===
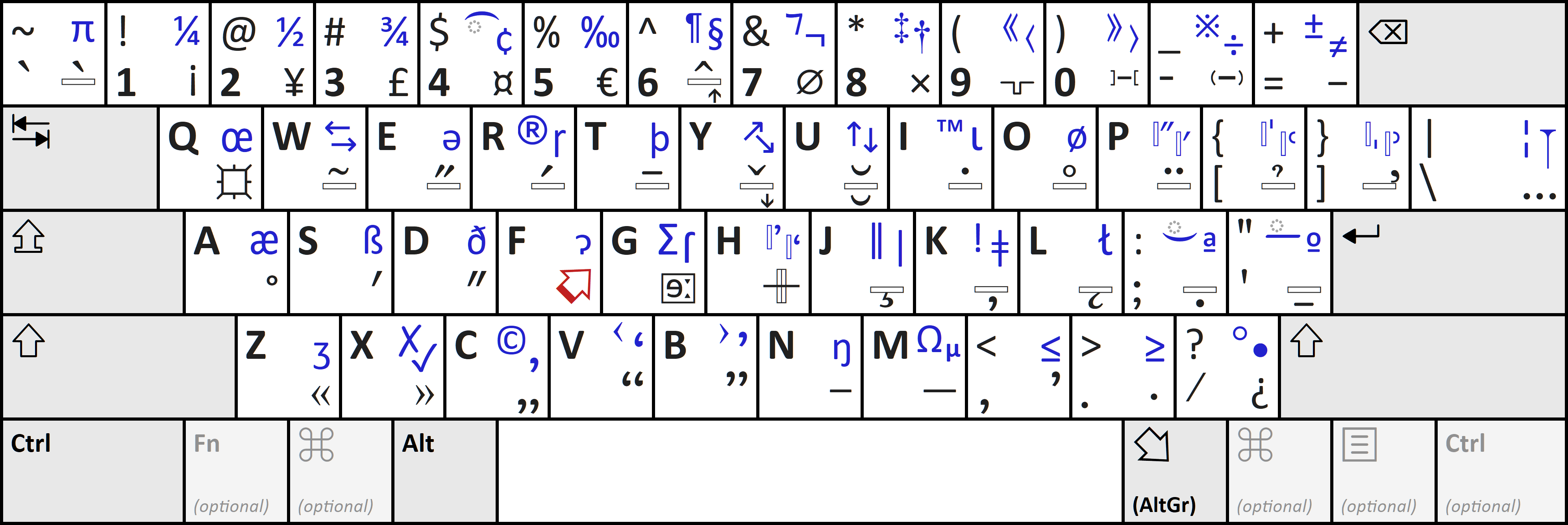

Keyboard layout "Latin International-A", using the common key arrangement ISO A ("ANSI")

The characters at the lower left of the keytop depictions are produced by pressing the key without pressing a special key simultaneously.
The characters at the upper left are produced by pressing the key together with ⇧ (the Shift key).
The characters at the lower right (in blackwhite) are produced by pressing the key while holding down AltGr.
The characters at the upper right (depicted in blue) are entered using the "Extra Selector" key (i.e. AltGr+f, see the following subsection).

=== The "Extra Selector" key for characters shown at the upper right of the keycaps ===
The characters shown at the upper right of the keytop depictions are entered using the special "Extra Selector" key combination AltGr+f, which has the symbol (the AltGr key is explained below). If a letter is shown that has uppercase and lowercase variants, only the lowercase variant is shown on the keytop. If two characters are shown in the upper right quadrant of the keytop depiction, the first (upper left) one is to be entered using the Shift key on the second input key.

Examples:

- Icelandic þ (lowercase thorn): (AltGr+f), release these keys, then t.
- Icelandic Þ (uppercase thorn): (AltGr+f), release these keys, then ⇧+T.
- Copyright symbol ©: (AltGr+f), release these keys, then ⇧+C.
- Cent symbol ¢: (AltGr+f), release these keys, then 4.

Explanations for some of these characters and symbols:

- (on $), (on :), (on "): These symbols denote diacritical marks spanning over or under two letters. They are to be entered after the first letter and before the second letter.
- ⁊ (on &) is the Tironian et.
- : Narrow vertical rectangles mark symbols used as letters (modifier letters in Unicode terminology) which are used in transliteration systems and in the orthographies of some languages. Especially, the ʻ on the h key is the ʻokina used in Hawaiian.
- (on \) is a symbol for invisible zero width non-joiner which prevents unwanted ligatures, as between the constituents of German compound words (e.g. at the "fi" in Schilfinsel, a compound of Schilf 'reed' and Insel 'island').
- (on i) is the dotless i used in Turkish, Azerbaijani and other languages.
- ɂ (on f) denotes the letter Ɂ/ɂ used for the glottal stop in some languages.
- ∑ (on G) is the sum symbol (e.g. usable for descriptions of spreadsheet formulas). ſ (on g) is the long s.
- ǁ ǀ ǃ ǂ (on J j K k) are click letters used in some languages of Namibia and South Africa.
- ◦ (on ?) and • (on /) are bullet points.

=== The AltGr key for characters shown at the lower right of the keycaps ===
The AltGr key (usually placed right of the space bar instead of the right Alt key) is to be pressed together with any key to input the character (or function) shown (or symbolized) at the lower right of the keycap. E.g., pressing AltGr together with 2 yields the Yen/Yuan sign "¥". Especially, this applies for the following special characters represented by symbols:

- (AltGr+9): Narrow no-break space
- (AltGr+0): Non-breaking hyphen
- (AltGr+-): Soft hyphen

Moreover, for the following characters, explanations are given here:

- ⌀ (AltGr+6): This is the diameter sign (neither the null sign ∅ nor the Danish letter Ø).
- ′ (AltGr+s) and ″ (AltGr+d): These are the symbols for foot/arcminute and inch/arcsecond.
- ’ (AltGr+,): This is the "curly apostrophe" (the preferred form of the apostrophe in quality typography).
- − (AltGr+=) is the minus sign (visually matching the "+" sign), – (AltGr+n) is the en dash, — (AltGr+m) is the em dash.

The following functions can be selected by the AltGr key:

- : Narrow horizontal rectangles mark dead keys (see below).
- (AltGr+q) is the "Superselect" key to select from a large set of special characters (see below).
- (AltGr+f) is the "Extra Selector" key to select characters displayed in the upper right corner of the keytops (see above).
- (AltGr+g) is the "IPA Special Selector key" to select characters of the International Phonetic Alphabet (see below).
- (AltGr+h) is the special dead key for the horizontal crossbar (see below).

==== Dead keys (marked by horizontal rectangles) ====
Dead keys for diacritical marks are marked by narrow horizontal rectangles, which also indicate the position of the diacritical mark relative to the base letter (this is according to ISO/IEC 9995-11). First, the dead key is to be pressed and released, then the base letter. According to ISO/IEC 9995-11, this only has to work for combinations for which individual code points are defined in Unicode (precomposed characters), as the Microsoft Windows keyboard driver model only allows this (as of December 2025). However, this covers the common use cases for widely used languages.

To be able to enter diacritical characters independently of this restriction, you can also enter them after the base character by actuating the dead key twice.

Examples:

- To enter the character Ç (capital C with cedilla), which is common and therefore available as a precombined character in Unicode, press (i.e., AltGr+j), release them, and then press the ⇧+C keys.
- To enter the character X̱ (capital X with macron below), which is not common and not available as a precombined character in Unicode, press ⇧+X first, then (i.e., AltGr+') twice.

The dead key "breve" (AltGr+u) puts the breve above of the character for all characters (e.g. Ă, ă), except for H and h where it is put beneath (as the characters Ḫ and ḫ are common in transliteration systems).

All dead keys are entered using the AltGr key. The characters ` (grave accent) and ^ (circumflex accent) typed without pressing AltGr behave like the according keys of the standard US ANSI keyboard, generating spacing characters (as appropriate e.g. for the input of programming code). Note that the dead key variant of ~ (the tilde) is placed on another key (w) than the spacing tilde, as the AltGr-place there already is occupied by the grave accent as dead key.

==== Chained dead keys ====
Dead keys also can be chained, in particular for Vietnamese. This works for result characters available as precomposed characters in Unicode (as it is the case for all common Vietnamese characters).

For example, to enter ự (u with horn and underdot), press AltGr+ (i.e. AltGr+]) for the horn, release these keys, then press AltGr+ (i.e. AltGr+;) for the underdot, release these keys, then press u. (The order in which the diacritical marks are entered is irrelevant.)

To enter an Ẹ́ (E with acute accent and underdot) for Yoruba (as an example of a character not available in Unicode as a precomposed character), press ⇧+E, release these keys, then (i.e. AltGr+r), then the same key combination again, then (i.e. AltGr+;), then the same key combination again.

==== Dead keys on digits: Superscripting and subscripting ====
The circumflex (i.e., AltGr+6) applied on a digit (i.e., pressed and released before typing the digit) yields the superscript version of the digit (as indicated by the arrow in the keyboard symbol). Likewise, the caron (i.e., AltGr+y) yields the subscript version of the digit. Besides digits, the same applies for the parentheses ( and ), the plus sign + and the hyphen-minus -, the latter yielding a superscripted or subscripted minus sign.

==== Dead keys on space: Spacing variants of the diacritical marks ====
Applying a diacritical mark on the space yields a spacing variant of the mark (i.e., a character showing the mark on its own instead of being applied onto a letter) whenever such a character is contained in Unicode.
For instance, the input sequence (i.e. AltGr+p) – Space bar yields "¨".

For some diacritical marks for which no spacing variant is contained in Unicode, such sequences yield a spacing character similar to the diacritical mark, especially:

- (i.e. AltGr+[) – Space bar yields "ˀ" (a superscript version of the glottal stop letter).
- (i.e. AltGr+k) – Space bar yields "⸴" (a slightly elevated comma).
- (i.e. AltGr+;) – Space bar yields "⸳" (a slightly elevated full stop).

==== The special dead key for the horizontal crossbar ====
The special dead key (AltGr+h) applies the horizontal crossbar onto letters. As any dead key, it is to be entered before the letter to which it applies. Especially, it is used to enter the following letters:

- Đ/đ used for Serbo-Croatioan, Vietnamese and several other languages,
- Ħ/ħ for Maltese,
- Ŧ/ŧ for Sámi languages,
- Ʉ/ʉ for Comanche and other languages.

It is not to be used to enter Ł/ł (as used for Polish, Sorbian, Venetian, and several North American indigenous languages), as the bar is not horizontal. Also, it is not suited for Icelandic Eth (Ð/ð), since this is a different letter than the đ with horizontal bar (although the uppercase forms look identical). These letters are entered with the "Extra Selector" (see above) followed by L/l resp. D/d.

==== The generic currency symbol ¤ as dead key to enter other currency symbols ====
The key ¤ (AltGr+4 acts as a dead key to enter currency symbols. To enter such a symbol, enter ¤ first and then a letter according to the following table (uppercase for symbols in the first line, lowercase for those in the second line).

	q	w	e	r	t	y	u	i	o	p	a	s	d	f	g	h	j	k	l	z	x	c	v	b	n	m	Space bar
A...Z a...z	₧ ₡	⃄ ₩	₠ €	₽ ₹	₮	¥	⃃		¤	₱ ₰	₳	⃀ ₪	֏ ₫	₣ ƒ	₾ ₲	₤ ₴	₯ ₨	₭	₺ £	⃂ ⃁	$ ₢	₵ ¢	ℛ ℳ	₿ ฿	₻ ₦	₼ ₥	¤

==== Other characters which can be entered by dead keys ====
Dead key i.e. AltGr+	6	t		i	h	u		]					
Second key	=	-	=		-	H	h	C	c	E	e	I	i
Result	≙	⹀ (Note: This is the double hyphen (a punctuation mark different from the equals sign).)	≡	(Note: This is a diacritical mark to be entered after the character to which it applies.)	⸺ (Note: This is the two-em dash.)	Ḫ	ḫ	Ƈ	ƈ	Ɛ	ɛ	Ĳ (Note: The Dutch ligatures Ĳ/ĳ to be used when in fact required as single characters, instead of simply using the letter sequences "IJ"/"ij".)	ĳ

=== Characters which can be entered by Shift+AltGr ===
Some additional characters can be entered by pressing a key together with ⇧ (Shift) + AltGr. These are not displayed on the keytops, according to ISO/IEC 9995-1:2026. These are diacritical marks (and a special character combination on the - key) used for transliterations of non-Latin script systems and other special purposes, related to the ones shown in the lower right part of the keytops (which are accessed by AltGr without ⇧).

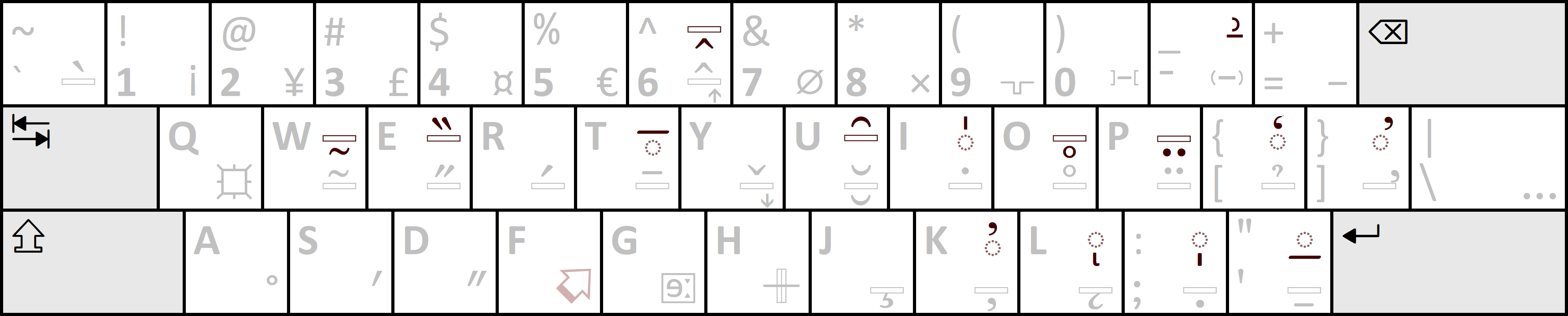

Diagram showing the characters enterable by ⇧+AltGr in the upper right parts of the keytops
(there are no such characters below the ASDFGH row.)

The diacritical marks marked by narrow horizontal rectangles are dead keys.
The ones marked by a dotted circle are to be entered after the base letter on which they are to be applied.
(on the 6 key) denotes the "circumflex below" used in Venḓa, a language spoken in South Africa and Zimbabwe.
(on the L key) is the "open mark" used in some orthographies of Low German.
The overline on the T key and the underline on the ' key yield connecting lines when applied to consecutive characters.

=== Input of IPA phonetic characters using the "IPA Special Selector key" ===
The "IPA Special Selector key" (AltGr+g) can be used to enter all phonetic symbols of the International Phonetic Alphabet (IPA), as listed in the 1999 edition of the Handbook of the International Phonetic Association (the current edition as of February 2026), excluding some of the symbols listed there in the Appendix 3: Extensions to the IPA. This repertoire is supplemented by three symbols ȴ, ȵ, and ȶ used in sinology. To enter such characters, press the key followed by a letter and a number. (Thus, this key acts like a compose key, with the exception that the result does not visually resemble a composition of the two following characters.) This pair identifies the IPA character according to the following tables (upper table: enter the letter first, followed by the digit; lower table: reverse order).

The diacritical characters entered in this way according to the lower table are always applied to the previously entered letter (or, in the case of subsequent entry, to the character to the left of the cursor).

The following tables correspond to those in the international standard ISO/IEC 9995-9.

IPA Letters: Enter letter (column header) first, then digit (row header)
	a	b	c	d	e	f	g	h	i	j	k	l	m	n	o	p	q	r	s	t	u	v	w	x	y	z
1					ᵊ	ǀ		ʰ		ʲ		ˡ		ⁿ			ˤ	ɿ	ˢ				ʷ	ˣ	ʸ	
2		ʙ		ᶑ	ɝ	ǁ	ɢ	ʜ	ɪ			ʟ		ɴ	ɶ			ʀ							ʏ	
3	ɐ				ə	ǂ		ɥ			ʞ	ƛ	ɯ					ɹ	ʅ	ʇ		ʌ	ʍ		ʎ	
4		ɓ	ƈ	ɗ	ɚ	ǃ	ɠ	ɦ			ƙ	ɬ				ƥ	ʠ	ɾ		ƭ		ⱱ				
5	ɑ	β	ç	ð	ɛ	ʘ	ɣ	ꟸ	ɩ			λ		ɳ	ɷ		ʔ	ʁ		θ	ʊ	ʋ		χ		ʒ
6	ɒ	ꞵ	ʗ	ɖ	ɜ		ɡ	ɧ		ʝ		ɭ	ɱ	ŋ	ɔ		ʕ	ɽ	ʃ	ʈ						ʐ
7				ʣ	ɞ	ɸ	ʛ	ħ	ɨ	ɟ		ɫ		ƞ	ɵ		ʡ	ɻ	ʂ	ƫ	ʉ			ʦ		ƻ
8		[	ɕ	ʤ	ʚ		ɤ	ʮ	ˑ	ʄ		ȴ	ɰ	ȵ	ø		ʢ	ɺ	ʆ	ȶ	ˌ	|		ʧ		ʑ
9	æ	]		ʥ	ɘ		ˠ	ʯ	ː	‿		ɮ		ɲ	œ		ʖ	ɼ		ᶿ	ˈ	‖		ʨ		ʓ

IPA special characters: Enter digit (row header) first, then letter (column header)
	a	b	c	d	e	f	g	h	i	j	k	l	m	n	o	p	q	r	s	t	u	v	w	x	y	z
1	̽	᷄		̄	̈				̂	̏	̑		᷈	᷅	̚	̊	́	̃	̇	̋	̌		̀		̆	͡
2	̪	̴	̢	̬	̤	̜	̹	̙	̞	̘	̯	̺	̫		̝	̥	̗	̰	̣	̩	̟	̼	̖	̡	̠	̻
3		/	)			ʻ	ʼ	[	˧	]	ꜛ	ꜜ	‖	|	˨	˩	ˑ	˞		˹	˦	ˈ	ː	(	˥	
4	,		⸩					{	˕	}	↗	↘			˔		ˏ		.	ˌ	˖		ˎ	⸨	˗	‿

Examples:

The input sequence – r – 5 yields ʁ.
The input sequence – o – 6 yields ɔ, the subsequent input sequence – 2 – r complements this to ɔ̰ (open o with tilde below).

The following common IPA special characters can be entered using shorter key sequences:

- ː (Length mark): – . (dot; alternatively – :)
- ˑ (half length mark): – , (comma)
- ˈ (primary stress): – +
- ˌ (secondary stress): – -
- ‖ (major intonation group): – #

=== Input of other characters using the "Superselect key" ===
The "Superselect key" (AltGr+q) allows inputting a large set of special characters. Its symbol is named "square sun". It works similar to a compose key, with the exception that the result does not visually resemble a composition of the two following characters. This key (including its name) is defined in its own international standard, and, based on this, can be included into any keyboard layout. Therefore, some characters which can be entered by this mechanism are duplications of ones which can be entered with the Latin International keyboard directly. According to that standard, the keyboard symbol may be used instead of as long as the former symbol is not used for another purpose.

The characters selectable by the "Superselect" are listed in the following table. To enter one of the characters listed there, enter "Superselect" followed by:

- the "group" character (a lowercase letter "a"..."z"), which is shown in the first column, selecting the group of characters denoted by it in the table.
- the "selection" character, which is an uppercase or lowercase letter "A"..."Z"/"a"..."z" or (for some groups) a digit "0"..."9", selecting the letter shown in the corresponding column.

The table contains three rows for each group:

- the first one shows (besides a short description of the group) the characters selectable by "0"..."9" (if any),
- the second one shows the characters selectable by "A"..."Z",
- and the third one shows the characters selectable by "a"..."z".

Characters selectable by "Superselect"
	Description																1	2	3	4	5	6	7	8	9	0
	Q q	W w	E e	R r	T t	Y y	U u	I i	O o	P p	A a	S s	D d	F f	G g	H h	J j	K k	L l	Z z	X x	C c	V v	B b	N n	M m
a	Diacritics																									
a	͇ ́	̨ ̀	̤ ̈	̰ ̃	̩ ̋	̮ ̆	᪷ ̌	̭ ̂	̧ ̉	̥ ̊	̦ ̛	̣ ̇	̸ ͘	҃ ̒	҆ ̓	҅ ̔	҄ ̏	҇ ̑	͟ ͠	͜ ͡	Iota subscript ͂	̷ ̐	̶ ̍	̵ ̎	̱ ̄	̲ ̅
v	Spacing diacritics and similar symbols																									
v	‗ ˊ	˛ ˋ	⫽ ¨	˷ ˜	ˌ ˝	⏑ ˘	ˇ	ꞈ ˆ	¸ ‧	˳ ˚	⸴ ´	⸳ ˙	⌐ ¯	ꜗ ʻ	ꜘ ʼ	ꜙ ʽ	ꜚ ⸚	ꜛ ↥	ꜜ ⸛	‿ ⁀	ͺ ῀	⁏ ⹁	` ˈ	⹂ ˮ	ˍ ˉ	~ ‾
e	Additional Latin letters																ˑ	ː	ˈ	ˌ	ʹ	ʺ	ʻ	ʼ	ʿ	ʾ
e	꟎ ꟏	Ƿ ƿ	Ə ə	ɼ	Þ þ	Ꟛ ꟛ	Ȣ ȣ	İ ı	Œ œ	Ɂ ɂ	Æ æ	ẞ ß	Ð ð	ʕ ſ		Ƕ ƕ	Ȝ ȝ	ʔ ĸ	Ƛ ƛ	Ʒ ʒ	Ꭓ ꭓ	Ꞌ ꞌ	Ɤ ɤ	Ꞵ ꞵ	Ŋ ŋ	Ƞ ƞ
f	Additional Latin letters (e.g. for African languages)																ǀ	ǁ	ǂ	ǃ	ʘ	꞉	꞊	ᵊ	ˁ	ˀ
f	Ƣ ƣ	Ꞷ ꞷ	Ǝ ǝ	Ꝛ ꝛ		Ь ь	Ʊ ʊ	Ɪ ɪ	Ɔ ɔ		Ɑ ɑ	Ʃ ʃ	ƌ Ƌ		Ɣ ɣ	Ɥ ɥ	Ʝ ʝ		Ⱡ ⱡ	Ƹ ƹ			Ʌ ʌ	Ƃ ƃ	Ꞑ ꞑ	
h	Latin letters with hook above and similar																									
h	Ꜣ ꜣ	Ⱳ ⱳ	Ɛ ɛ	Ʀ ʀ	Ƭ ƭ	Ƴ ƴ		Ꞽ ꞽ		Ƥ ƥ			Ɗ ɗ		Ɠ ɠ	Ɦ ɦ	Ĳ ĳ	Ƙ ƙ	Ŀ ŀ		Ꜥ ꜥ	Ƈ ƈ	Ʋ ʋ	Ɓ ɓ	ŉ	
b	Latin letters with hook below and similar																									
b	Ɋ ɋ			Ɽ ɽ	Ʈ ʈ		Ɯ ɯ	Ɩ ɩ					Ɖ ɖ	Ƒ ƒ		Ꜧ ꜧ			Ɬ ɬ	Ȥ ȥ		Ꞔ ꞔ		Ꞗ ꞗ	Ɲ ɲ	Ɱ ɱ
z	Latin Letters with horizontal stroke																									
z			ꬳ	Ɍ ɍ	Ŧ ŧ	Ɏ ɏ	Ʉ ʉ	Ɨ ɨ	Ɵ ɵ	Ᵽ ᵽ		Ꟊ ꟊ	Đ đ	Ꞙ ꞙ	Ǥ ǥ	Ħ ħ	Ɉ ɉ	Ꝁ ꝁ	Ƚ ƚ	Ƶ ƶ		Ꞓ ꞓ		Ƀ ƀ		
x	Latin letters with diagonal stroke																									
x			Ɇ ɇ	Ꞧ ꞧ	Ⱦ ⱦ		Ꞹ ꞹ		Ø ø		Ⱥ ⱥ	Ꞩ ꞩ			Ꞡ ꞡ			Ꞣ ꞣ	Ł ł			Ȼ ȼ	Ꝟ ꝟ		Ꞥ ꞥ	₥
r	Raised Latin letters and digits																¹	²	³	⁴	⁵	⁶	⁷	⁸	⁹	⁰
r	ꟴ	ᵂ ʷ	ᴱ ᵉ	ᴿ ʳ	ᵀ ᵗ	ʸ	ᵁ ᵘ	ᴵ ⁱ	ᴼ ᵒ	ᴾ ᵖ	ᴬ ᵃ	꟱ ˢ	ᴰ ᵈ	ꟳ ᶠ	ᴳ ᵍ	ᴴ ʰ	ᴶ ʲ	ᴷ ᵏ	ᴸ ˡ	ᶻ	ˣ	ꟲ ᶜ	ⱽ ᵛ	ᴮ ᵇ	ᴺ ⁿ	ᴹ ᵐ
q	Smallcap-like shaped and lowered Latin letters and digits																₁	₂	₃	₄	₅	₆	₇	₈	₉	₀
q	ꞯ	ᴡ ₝	ᴇ ₑ	ʀ ᵣ	ᴛ ₜ	ʏ ₞	ᴜ ᵤ	ɪ ᵢ	ᴏ ₒ	ᴘ ₚ	ᴀ ₐ	ꜱ ₛ	ᴅ	ꜰ	ɢ	ʜ ₕ	ᴊ ⱼ	ᴋ ₖ	ʟ ₗ	ᴢ ₟	ₓ	ᴄ	ᴠ ᵥ	ʙ	ɴ ₙ	ᴍ ₘ
o	Encircled Latin letters and digits																①	②	③	④	⑤	⑥	⑦	⑧	⑨	⓪
o	Ⓠ ⓠ	Ⓦ ⓦ	Ⓔ ⓔ	Ⓡ ⓡ	Ⓣ ⓣ	Ⓨ ⓨ	Ⓤ ⓤ	Ⓘ ⓘ	Ⓞ ⓞ	Ⓟ ⓟ	Ⓐ ⓐ	Ⓢ ⓢ	Ⓓ ⓓ	Ⓕ ⓕ	Ⓖ ⓖ	Ⓗ ⓗ	Ⓙ ⓙ	Ⓚ ⓚ	Ⓛ ⓛ	Ⓩ ⓩ	Ⓧ ⓧ	Ⓒ ⓒ	Ⓥ ⓥ	Ⓑ ⓑ	Ⓝ ⓝ	Ⓜ ⓜ
g	Greek letters																									
g	͂ Iota subscript	ς	Ε ε	Ρ ρ	Τ τ	Υ υ	Θ θ	Ι ι	Ο ο	Π π	Α α	Σ σ	Δ δ	Φ φ	Γ γ	Η η	Ξ ξ	Κ κ	Λ λ	Ζ ζ	Χ χ	Ψ ψ	Ω ω	Β β	Ν ν	Μ μ
y	Additional Greek letters																									
y	Ϙ ϙ	Ϝ ϝ	⁙ ϵ	ϼ ϱ	Ϟ ϟ	ϒ ϶	ϴ ϑ	͵ ·	Ͻ ͻ	ʹ ϖ	Ͼ ͼ	Ϲ ϲ	Ͽ ͽ	᾽ ϕ	Ͷ ͷ	Ͱ ͱ	Ϳ ϳ	ϰ	΄ ;	Ͳ ͳ	Ϡ ϡ	Ϛ ϛ	Ϻ ϻ	῾ ϐ	Ϸ ϸ	Ϗ ϗ
c	Currency symbols																									
c	₧ ₡	⃄ ₩	₠ €	₽ ₹	₮	¥	⃃		¤	₱ ₰	₳	⃀ ₪	֏ ₫	₣ ƒ	₾ ₲	₤ ₴	₯ ₨	₭	₺ £	⃂ ⃁	$ ₢	₵ ¢	ℛ ℳ	₿ ฿	₻ ₦	₼ ₥
t	Letterlike and Other Symbols																⑪	⑫	⑬	⑭	⑮	⑯	⑰	⑱	⑲	⑩
t	∶ ‰	⋅ ⌘	⑳ ℮	® ℞	™ ※	≡ ÷	≙ ≅	∼ ≈	♂ º	℗ ¶	♀ ª	℠ §	↵ ℔	/ ﬁ	∕ ﬂ	∠ ﴾	∡ ﴿	∢ ␣	∟ ℓ	⚥ ±	✕ ×	© ℅	� ♫	♯ ♭	№ ♪	Ω µ
s	Geometric shapes and related symbols																☐	❖	❑	‣	➤	⮚	➔	➜	✔	✘
s	□ ■	◇ ◆	○ ●	☞ ☛	☜ ☚	◌ ¦	⦀ ‖	↨ ↕	☹ ☺	✗ ✓	▣ ∎	◈ ◊	◉ ◎	↗ ↑	↘ ↓	❧ →	☙ ←	❦ ‡	✝ †	▫ ▪	♡ ♥	◦ •	△ ▲	▽ ▼	▷ ►	◁ ◄
m	Mathematical symbols																¼	½	¾	⅛	⅜	⅝	⅞	⅓	⅔	∅
m	ℚ ≠	≫ ≪	∄ ∃	ℝ √	∇ ⟂	≥ ≤	∩ ∪	∝ ∞	∉ ∈	∏ ⇌	ℵ ∀	∑ ∫	∆ ∂	∴ ∵	⊇ ⊆	ℏ ℎ	⊄ ⊂	⊅ ⊃	∌ ∋	ℤ ↔	⋄ ¬	ℂ ∛	∧ ∨	⇎ ⇔	ℕ ⇐	⇏ ⇒
p	Punctuation marks																									
p	⸮ ¿	‽ ¡	⸘ ·	⟪ ⟨	⟫ ⟩	⁞ …	⹝ ⸢	⸗ ⸣	‛ ⸤	‟ ⸥	∗ °	‵ ′	‶ ″	⁊ ⌀	‚ „	‘ “	’ ”	‹ «	› »	⁂	⁒	‐	⹀	― ‒	⸺ –	⸻ —
	Q	W	E	R	T	Y	U	I	O	P	A	S	D	F	G	H	J	K	L	Z	X	C	V	B	N	M

Note: In the "q" group, the lowered Latin letters w, y, and z are scheduled for inclusion in Unicode version 18.0, expected for September 2026. In the "c" group, the same applies to the currency symbols at W, u, and Z.

The symbols shown in gray in the last group "Punctuation marks" are the ones defined in ISO/IEC 9995-7 and 9995-10 for the following invisible characters and special hyphens and dashes:

	Input sequence	Unicode character	
	– p – 1		U+202F narrow no-break space
	– p – 2		U+00A0 no-break space
	– p – 3		U+2003 em space
	– p – 4		U+2007 figure space
	– p – 5		U+2009 thin space
	– p – 6		U+200A hair space
	– p – 7		U+200B zero width space
	– p – 8		U+034F combining grapheme joiner
	– p – 9		U+200D zero width joiner
	– p – 0		U+200C zero width non-joiner
‐	– p – C	‐	U+2010 hyphen (for use where U+002D hyphen-minus is not appropriate)
⹀	– p – V	⹀	U+2E40 double hyphen
―	– p – B	―	U+2015 horizontal bar
⸺	– p – N	⸺	U+2E3A two-em dash
⸻	– p – M	⸻	U+2E3B three-em dash
⁓	– p – z	⁓	U+2053 swung dash
−	– p – x	−	U+2212 minus sign
	– p – c		U+00AD soft hyphen
	– p – v	‑	U+2011 non-breaking hyphen
‒	– p – b	‒	U+2012 figure dash
–	– p – n	–	U+2013 en dash
—	– p – m	—	U+2014 em dash

== Variants ==
The standard ISO/IEC 9995-3:2026 defines several variants based on different key arrangements. The set and arrangement of the character keys is identical for all variants (with the exception of the placement of the \ key which varies with the shape of the return key), while the placement of the AltGr key varies. Additional keys present in some key arrangements are used:

- as a dedicated "Extra selector" key (which then can be typed without the simultaneous pressing of the AltGr key),
- or as a "left AltGr key". This has the ergonomic advantage that all key combinations using AltGr can be typed without two-finger combinations of one hand.

Some layout variants use the Shift Lock / Caps Lock key as "left AltGr" key. For these variants, pressing that key together with a Control key (Ctrl) shall cause the Shift Lock or Caps Lock function. This has the additional ergonomic anvantage that an inadvertent touch of that key alone has no effect.

For example, the layout "Latin International-S" is based on the hardware key arrangement of the Korean Dubeolsik layout. Thus, it is considered to pose no specific challenges on manufacturers of keyboard hardware. It utilizes the additional keys left and right of the space bar as "left and right AltGr keys", and has a dedicated "Extra selector" key instead of a right Alt key. Moreover, its large shift keys and its large return key are considered as an ergonomic advance.

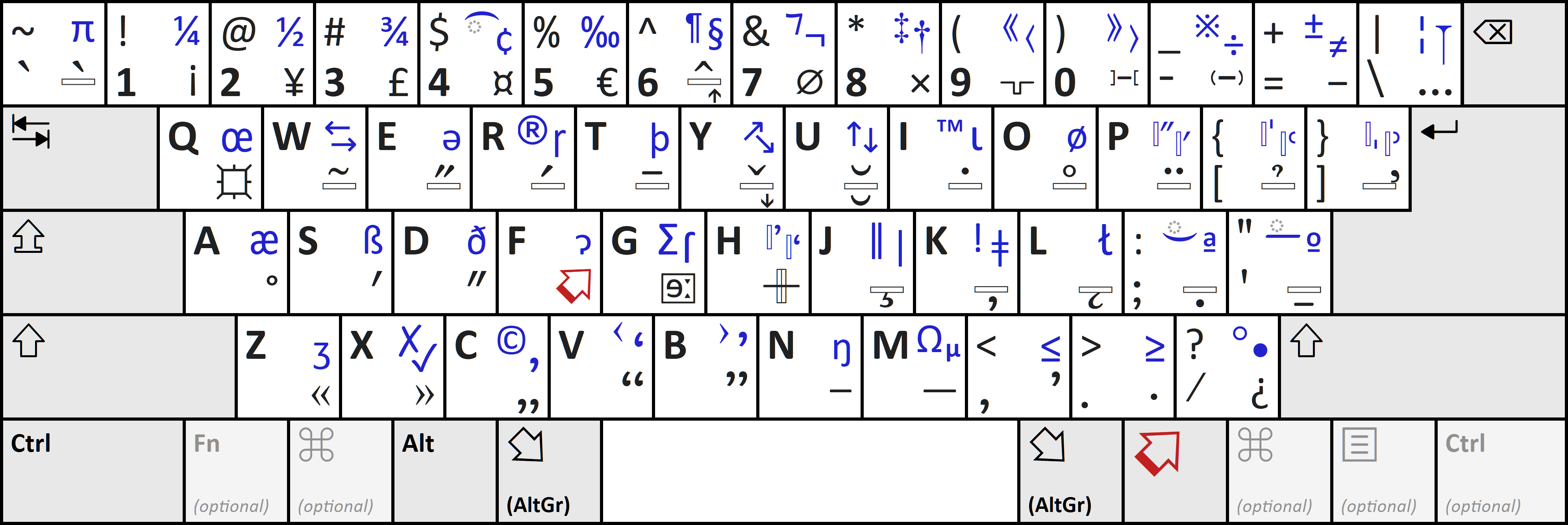

Keyboard layout "Latin International-S"

== Availability ==
As of May 2026, a free keyboard driver for the variant "Latin International-A" is available for Microsoft Windows 8/10/11, together with its source code.

== See also ==
- German extended keyboard layout
