= German extended keyboard layout =

Keyboard layout

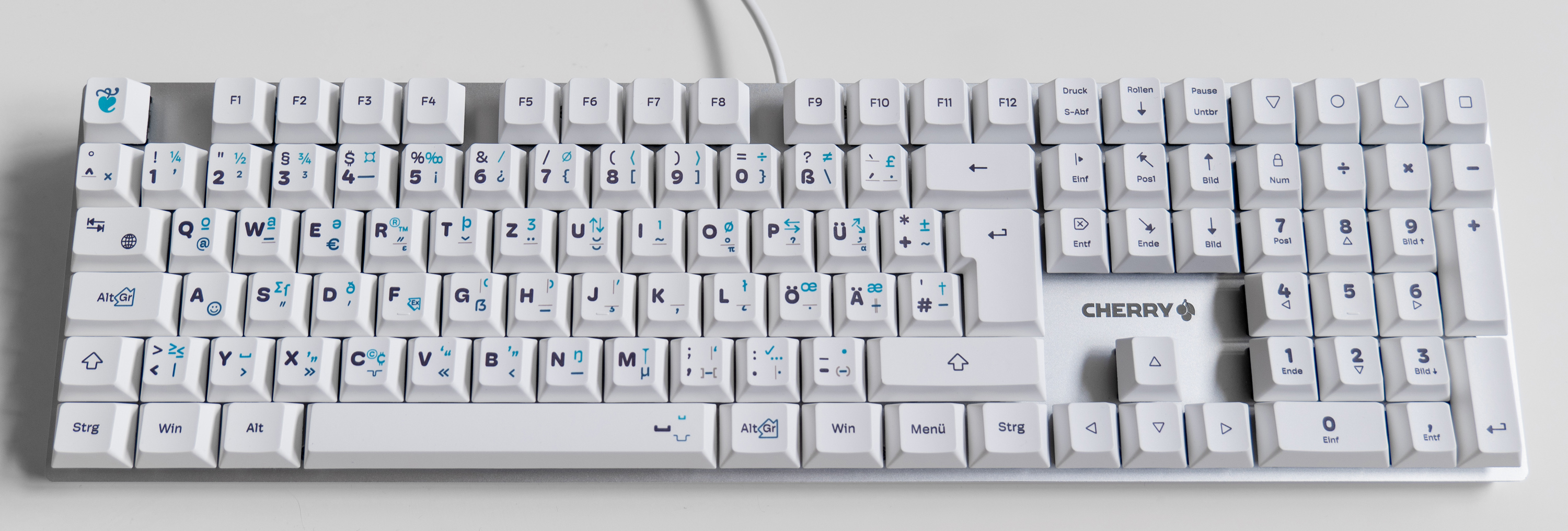
German extended keyboard layout "E1"

The German extended keyboard layout is an extended version of the basic German keyboard layout. It enables users to enter all letters and diacritical marks used in the primary official languages of all countries worldwide and in European minority languages, provided these languages use the Latin script. It also enables the input of all punctuation marks regularly used in Europe and various frequently used special characters such as bullet points and arrows, as well as transcription characters for other writing systems.

There are two variants: The "E1" variant is compliant with the common German key arrangement (which employs an extra key right of the left Shift key, in comparison with the common US QWERTY key arrangement), to be used on existing German standard keyboards where only additional engravings are appropriate, but no changes. The "E2" variant complies with the common US QWERTY key arrangement hardware (but would require a different key labelling).

The layout variants can be selected in Microsoft Windows since the 24H2 update for Windows 11 as "German extended (E1)" and "German extended (E2)" ("Deutsch erweitert (E1)" and "Deutsch erweitert (E2)" if German language is selected).

The "E1" and "E2" variants were first defined in the 2018 version of the German DIN standard DIN 2137 and were slightly revised in the current 2023 version (DIN 2137-01:2023-08). Thus, they are two of the three current standard German-language keyboard layouts for Germany and Austria (alongside the basic keyboard layout now called "T1", which has been standardized since 2003). They replace the extended layouts T2 and T3 defined in the 2012 version of DIN 2137, which did not gain widespread use.

== Objectives ==
The extended keyboard layout meets the following requirements:

- All proper names can be entered correctly (i.e., with all special letters and diacritical marks) regardless of the origin of the name bearer (as long as the Latin script is used).
- All minority languages spoken in Europe (e.g., Sorbian or Sámi) can be entered correctly.
- All Latin characters and all special characters listed in DIN 91379 "Characters and defined character sequences in Unicode for the electronic processing of names and data exchange in Europe" can be entered.
- Standardized transliterations are supported for common non-Latin scripts, such as Arabic according to DIN 31635, Chinese (Pinyin), Hebrew according to DIN 31636, Russian and other languages using the Cyrillic script according to DIN 1460, and Sanskrit according to IAST. This means that personal names from these languages can also be written unambiguously, as required in scientific and religious contexts and also in Wikipedia.
- "Write as printed": All characters used in the printing of normal texts can also be entered. The restrictions and compromises in typeface that date back to the era of mechanical typewriters have been overcome.
- The layout is backward compatible with the German standard keyboard layout (T1) commonly used to date. Ten-finger touch typists in particular should not have to relearn anything, but should only have to learn new finger combinations for newly enterable characters as needed.
- The additional characters should be arranged in positions that are easy to learn and to recognize.
- Operating concepts familiar to users of the basic German keyboard layout are used to a wider extent.
  - This applies to the use of the AltGr key, which is used on the basic German keyboard layout e.g. to enter brackets or the Euro sign. In the German standard, the key is named "Alt Gr" (containing a space).
  - This also applies to the use of dead keys, which are used on the basic German keyboard layout to enter accented letters like á à â é è ê.
- The layout requires as few new operating concepts as possible. In fact, two such concepts are added:
  - The "Extra Selector" key (see below; German Extra-Wahltaste, resulting in a "group 2 single-select" in the terminology of ISO/IEC 9995-2).
  - "Special Selector" keys (German Wahltasten) are an extension of the dead key concept. Pressing such a key like a dead key, followed by another key, results in the input of a special character which not necessarily resembles the application of a diacritical mark onto the latter character. This complies with the concept of "peculiar characters" outlined in ISO/IEC 9995-11.
- The interpunct is placed at a prominent position (Alt Gr+.), as it is used in "Leichte Sprache" (a standardized version of the German language directed to people who have low competences in German).
- All characters mentioned in the main text of DIN 5008:2020-03 are placed at prominent positions that are easy to communicate in teaching and easy to enter. (This in particular results in the placement of the narrow non-breaking space on Alt Gr+c, so that it can be clearly identified and entered in the same way as the non-breaking space on Alt Gr+Space.)
- The keyboard layout can be easily communicated (especially in teaching).
- The keyboard layout must be able to be implemented on common operating systems, especially Microsoft Windows, without any special tricks. In particular, no modifications to the operating system itself are required.

== Scope ==
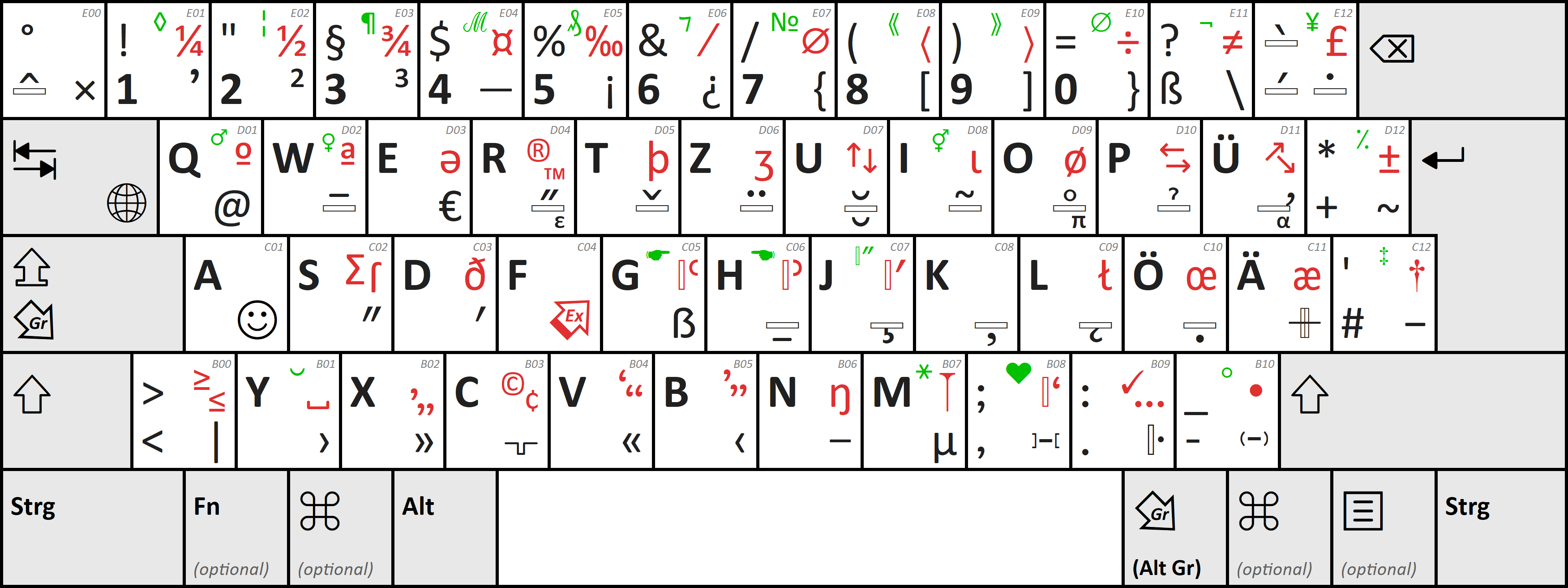

German extended keyboard layout "E1" (for the "E2" variant, see below)

The characters at the lower left of the keytop depictions are produced by pressing the key without pressing a special key simultaneously.
The characters at the top left are produced by pressing the key together with ⇧ (the Shift key.
The characters at the lower right (in black) are produced by pressing the key while holding down Alt Gr.
The characters at the top right (depicted in red or green) are entered using the "Extra Selector" key (i.e. Alt Gr+f, see below).
The characters depicted in green are usually in fact not engraved on the keytops (see below "Additional characters enterable by the Extra Selector key").

=== Dead keys ===
Dead keys for diacritical marks are marked by narrow horizontal rectangles, which also indicate the position of the diacritical mark relative to the base letter (this is according to ISO/IEC 9995-11). First, the dead key is to be pressed and released, then the base letter. According to DIN 2137-01:2023-08, this only has to work for combinations for which individual code points are defined in Unicode (precomposed characters), as the Microsoft Windows keyboard driver model only allows this (as of December 2025). However, this covers the common use cases for widely used languages. To be able to enter diacritical characters independently of this restriction, you can also enter them after the base character by actuating the dead key twice.

For example, to enter the character Ç (capital C with cedilla), press Alt Gr+ (i.e., Alt Gr+j), release them, and then press the ⇧+C keys.

Dead keys also can be chained, in particular for Vietnamese. For example, to enter ự (u with horn and underdot), press Alt Gr+ for the horn, release these keys, then press Alt Gr+ for the underdot, release these keys, then press u. (The order in which the diacritical marks are entered is irrelevant.)

To enter a Ẹ́ (E with acute accent and underdot) for Yoruba (as an example of a character not available in Unicode as a precomposed character), press ⇧+E, release these keys, then, then the same key again, then Alt Gr+, then the same key combination again.

=== Extra Selector key ===
The characters shown at the top right of the keytop depictions are entered using the special "Extra Selector" key combination Alt Gr+f, which is symbolized as. If a letter is shown that has uppercase and lowercase variants, only the lowercase variant is shown on the keytop. If two characters are shown in the upper right quadrant of the keytop depiction, the first (upper left) one is to be entered using the Shift key on the second input key.

Examples:

- Icelandic þ (lowercase): (Alt Gr+f), release these keys, then t.
- Icelandic Þ (uppercase): (Alt Gr+f), release these keys, then ⇧+T.
- Copyright symbol : (Alt Gr+f), release these keys, then ⇧+C.
- Cent symbol ¢: (Alt Gr+f), release these keys, then c.

=== Special Selector keys ===
Special Selector keys are an extension of the dead key concept and work in the same way: first, the Special Selector key is pressed together with Alt Gr, then a basic character; this results in the selection of an input character assigned to this combination. Some of the selection keys are also dead keys: for example, when applied to letters, the "caron and subscript key" (Alt Gr+t) produces a combination with the caron, thus acting as a dead key, while for numbers it produces the corresponding subscript number. Such modifier keys (except and for superscripting and subscripting digits) are indicated by an additional symbol on the narrow horizontal rectangle that indicates the function of the modifier key (ε for phonetic transcription, π for mathematical symbols, α for Greek letters).

=== Caps Lock / Shift Lock ===
DIN 2137-01:2023-08 does not stipulate that the key located on the left in the third row must be a Caps Lock or Shift Lock key, but recommends that this key position be used as a "left Alt Gr key." This would have the ergonomic advantage for touch typists that no input character requires the simultaneous use of two fingers of the same hand. The Caps Lock or Shift Lock function should then be accessible in another way, for example, by pressing this key together with the Control key to act as a Shift Lock (this would have the additional advantage to prevent accidental activation of the Shift Lock). The standard does not explicitly specify anything binding in this regard.

The Microsoft implementation (as of Windows 11 24H2) however utilizes the key as Shift Lock in the same way as for the basic German keyboard layout. However, it allows the simultaneous pressing of the left control key with the Alt key (which is only present as "left Alt key" on German keyboards) to act as Alt Gr key. Thus, characters reachable by Alt Gr on the right half of the keyboard are at least reachable by a uniform way of the use of the left hand, avoiding at least dislocating finger movements that otherwise would be required for combining Alt Gr with keys arranged vertical above the Alt Gr key.

== Keyboard symbols and corresponding input characters ==
Diacritical marks are symbolized by a narrow horizontal rectangle. This also indicates the position of the character relative to the base letter.

Some characters which are otherwise difficult to distinguish are symbolized together with a narrow vertical rectangle, which indicates the cap height (capital letter height) and thus the vertical position of the character.

Dead keys and Special Selector keys are marked in light or dark orange in the following lists.

=== Directly enterable characters with additional function ===
Key	Input character
	circumflex; yields ≙ when applied to = Superscript when applied to digits and + - ( )

=== Characters to be entered with Alt Gr (shown on keycaps in the lower right) ===
The key listed in the column "Key" is to be actuated together with the key Alt Gr, in no case together with the Shift key ⇧.
The table is sorted by the position of the keys in the German keyboard layout. A thicker horizontal separation line in this table indicates a new row of the keyboard layout.
The list only shows the characters that require a special explanation.

Symbol	Key	Resulting input character
		Multiplication cross
	1	Raised comma (used for the apostrophe in quality typography)
	4	Em dash. This is not located on Alt Gr+m (unlike the En dash which is in fact allocated to Alt Gr+n), as this position is used for the micro sign in the basic German keyboard layout and therefore retained in the German extended keyboard layout. Also, the em dash is not used commonly in German typography. Therefore, it is allocated to the "4" key as the "$" is on the shifted position of this key, resulting in "the US-American dash is positioned at the (US-American) Dollar sign".
		Overdot
		(Intended for future extensions, specifically in accordance with ISO/IEC 9995-9 and 9995-12)
	W	Macron
	R	Double acute accent if applied to o/O and u/U when writing Hungarian. Otherwise to enter IPA phonetic characters according to the table shown below.
	T	Caron Subscript if applied to digits and + - ( ) =
	Z	Two dot diacritic (diaeresis, umlaut)
	U	Breve; If applied to h/H, the breve will be placed below the letter (ḫ/Ḫ, as needed for Arabic transliteration), otherwise above the letter. If applied to c/C, j/J, k, n, and r/R, the special characters ƈ/Ƈ, ĳ/Ĳ, ĸ, ŉ, and ȓ/Ȓ (as enumerated in DIN 91379) will be generated. Third fractions when applied to the digits 1 and 2: ⅓ ⅔
	I	Tilde (diacritical mark) If applied to the tilde (punctuation mark, Alt Gr++), the approximately equals sign ≈ will be generated.
	O	Ring (overring) if applied to a/A, u/U, w, and y. If applied to digits: encirclement ① ② ... If applied to other letters and characters: mathematical symbols according to the table below.
	P	Hook above if applied to a/A e/E i/I o/O u/U y/Y when writing Vietnamese
	Ü	Horn if applied to o/O and u/U when writing Vietnamese. If applied to other letters: Greek letters according to the table below. Eighth fractions of applied to the digits 1 3 5 7: ⅛ ⅜ ⅝ ⅞
	+	Tilde (punctuation mark)
	A	Smiley: According to DIN 2137, this key combination can invoke a selection function for emojis and/or other special characters.
	S	Double prime (inches, arcseconds)
	D	Prime (feet, arcminutes)
	F	Extra Selector key (see above)
ẞ	G	Capital ß (capital sharp s). Although this is a capital letter, it is not needed to press the shift key ⇧ together with this key combination Alt Gr+g.
	H	Macron below It can also be used to create various special characters: - → ⹀ (double hyphen), = → ≡, + → ± (plus–minus sign), < > → ≤ ≥.
	J	Cedilla
	K	Comma below if applied to s/S and t/T when writing Romanian. If applied to g/G k/K l/L n/N, the key combination works like the one for the cedilla, since in Latvian the cedilla usually has the shape of a comma below. This makes it easier for users unfamiliar with the language to enter it correctly. Applied to other letters or characters, other special characters for living and extinct languages can be entered according to the tables below.
	L	Ogonek
	Ö	Underdot
	Ä	Strike-through key (horizontal bar accent) for entering, for example, the Serbo-Croatian and Vietnamese Ð/đ, the Maltese Ħ/ħ, or the Sámi Ŧ/ŧ. When applied to other characters, special characters are produced as shown in the table below, especially bullet characters when applied to digits. Note: The Polish/Sorbian/Venetian Ł/ł (L with a slanted, not straight, crossbar) is not entered with the crossbar accent, but with the key sequence – L/l.
	#	Minus sign: the symbol that matches the plus sign in size and position and is therefore typographically the preferred one
›	Y	Right-pointing single guillemet
»	X	Right-pointing guillemet
	C	Narrow non-breaking space
«	V	Left-pointing guillemet
‹	B	Left-pointing single guillemet
	N	En dash
μ	M	Micro sign
	,	Non-breaking hyphen
	.	Interpunct
	-	Soft hyphen

=== Characters to be input using the Extra Selector key (depicted on the upper right of the keycaps) ===
Symbol	Key	Resulting input character
¤	4	Generic currency sign
	6	Fraction slash: when used with suitable software and fonts, it produces fraction representations when surrounded by digits.
⌀	7	Diameter symbol Note: This is not the symbol ∅ for the empty set; this is to be entered as – =.
⟨	8	Opening angle bracket
⟩	9	Closing angle bracket
÷	0	Division sign
≠	ß	"Not equal" sign
£		Pound sign (currency sign)
º	q	Masculine ordinal indicator (as used e.g. in Italian and Spanish)
ª	w	Feminine ordinal indicator
ə	e/E	Letter ə/Ə for Azerbaijani and (as Schwa of the IPA phonetic alphabet) for various dialect transcriptions
	r/R	With Shift key ⇧: Registered trademark symbol Without Shift key ⇧: (unregistered) Trademark symbol
þ	t/T	Letter Thorn (þ/Þ) for Icelandic, Faroese and Old English
ʒ	z/Z	Letter Ezh (ʒ/Ʒ) for Sámi
	u/U	With Shift key ⇧: upwards arrow Without Shift key ⇧: downwards arrow
	i	Lowercase letter dotless i for Turkish and Azerbaijani. Note: The uppercase letter for it is the common uppercase I, which is to be entered without the Extra Selector key.
ø	o/O	Letter ø/Ø for Danish and Norwegian. Note: This is not the diameter symbol ⌀, which is to be entered as – 7. Also, this is not the symbol for the empty set ∅, which is to be entered as – =.
	p/P	With Shift key ⇧: leftward arrow Without Shift key ⇧: rightward arrow
	ü/Ü	With Shift key ⇧: slanted upward arrow ("positive trend", "see also"); Without Shift key ⇧: slanted downward arrow ("negative trend")
	s/S	With Shift key ⇧: Summation symbol (used e.g. in citations of spreadsheet formulas); Without Shift key ⇧: lowercase letter long s
ð	d/D	Letter Eth (ð/Ð) for Icelandic
	g	Transliteration character for Arabic Ayn according to DIN 31635 and Hebrew Ayin according to DIN 31636
	h	Transliteration character for Arabic Hamza according to DIN 31635 and Hebrew Aleph according to DIN 31636
	j	Transliteration character for Cyrillic ь ("soft sign") and Hebrew Geresh
	l/L	Letter ł/Ł (l/L with slanted short stroke) for Polish, Sorbian, Venetian, and other languages
œ	ö/Ö	Letter œ/Œ for French and other languages
æ	ä/Ä	Letter æ/Æ for Danish, Norwegian, Old English, and other languages. If a diacritical mark is to be applied to this letter, this is to be entered first, followed by and then ä/Ä.
	y	Gap symbol; open box
	x/X	With Shift key ⇧: German single opening quotation mark Without Shift key ⇧: German opening quotation mark
	c/C	With Shift key ⇧: Copyright symbol Without Shift key ⇧: Cent symbol
	v/V	With Shift key ⇧: German single closing quotation mark; English single opening quotation mark Without Shift key ⇧: German closing quotation mark; English opening quotation mark
	b/B	With Shift key ⇧: English single closing quotation mark Without Shift key ⇧: English closing quotation mark
ŋ	n/N	Letter Eng (ŋ/Ŋ) for Sámi, other languages, and dialect orthographies
	m	Zero-width non-joiner, which prevents automatic application of ligatures where German typographic rules do not allow them (e.g. in "Brotzeit" between t and z, as it is a compound word of "Brot" and "Zeit")
	,	ʻOkina
	.	With Shift key ⇧: Check mark Without Shift key ⇧: Ellipsis
	-	Bullet point

=== Additional characters (not displayed on the keytops) to be entered by the "Extra Selector" key ===
Other characters that can be entered using the Extra Selector key are not shown on the keytops, as they are only included for special applications (e.g., for reproducing historical texts). After entering the Extra Selector key, the input character listed in the following table is to be entered to get the character listed in the "result" row.

Key	1	2	3	4	5	6	7	8	9	0	ß		Q	W	I	+	G	H	J	#	Y	M	,	-
Input (with ⇧)	!	"	§	$	%	&	/	(	)	=	?		Q	W	I	*	G	H	J	'	Y	M	;	_
Result	◊	¦	¶	ℳ	₰	⁊ (Note: Tironian et: Used in Irish texts sometimes instead of the "&" (ampersand). Also, used in Fraktur for "et" in the abbreviation = "etc".)	№	⟪	⟫	∅ (Note: Empty set symbol. This is not the diameter symbol, which is to be entered as – 7.)	¬	¥	♂	♀	⚥	⁒	☛	☚	ʺ (Note: Transliteration character for the Cyrillic ъ (hard sign), which no longer is used in the modern Russian orthography)	‡	⏑	∗ (Note: "Telephony star" (see below))	♥	◦

The "telephony star" (to be entered by – ⇧+M) is the asterisk symbol that matches the hash sign "#" in design, position, and size for the description of inputs made on a telephone keypad. Since Unicode version 16.0 (released in September 2024), the Unicode character ∗ (U+2217 asterisk operator) is dedicated for this purpose.-

== Characters to be entered with special key combinations ==
=== Input of IPA phonetic characters ===
The "double acute and IPA Special Selector key" (Alt Gr+r) can be used to enter all phonetic symbols of the International Phonetic Alphabet (IPA), as listed in the 1999 edition of the Handbook of the International Phonetic Association (the current edition as of December 2025), excluding some of the symbols listed there in the Appendix 3: Extensions to the IPA. This repertoire is supplemented by three symbols ȴ, ȵ, and ȶ used in sinology. To enter such characters, press the key followed by a letter and a number. (Thus, this key acts like a compose key, with the exception that the result does not optically resemble a composition of the two following characters.) This pair identifies the IPA character according to the following tables (upper table: enter the letter first, followed by the digit; lower table: reverse order).

The diacritical characters entered in this way according to the lower table are always applied to the previously entered letter (or, in the case of subsequent entry, to the character to the left of the cursor).

The following tables correspond to those in the international standard ISO/IEC 9995-9. However, since the selection key used here also functions as a dead key (for applying a double acute) for the letters o and u, the umlauts ö and ü are used instead for phonetic transcription input.

IPA Letters: Enter letter (column header) first, then digit (row header)
	a	b	c	d	e	f	g	h	i	j	k	l	m	n	ö	p	q	r	s	t	ü	v	w	x	y	z
1					ᵊ	ǀ		ʰ		ʲ		ˡ		ⁿ			ˤ	ɿ	ˢ				ʷ	ˣ	ʸ	
2		ʙ		ᶑ	ɝ	ǁ	ɢ	ʜ	ɪ			ʟ		ɴ	ɶ			ʀ							ʏ	
3	ɐ				ə	ǂ		ɥ			ʞ	ƛ	ɯ					ɹ	ʅ	ʇ		ʌ	ʍ		ʎ	
4		ɓ	ƈ	ɗ	ɚ	ǃ	ɠ	ɦ			ƙ	ɬ				ƥ	ʠ	ɾ		ƭ		ⱱ				
5	ɑ	β	ç	ð	ɛ	ʘ	ɣ	ꟸ	ɩ			λ		ɳ	ɷ		ʔ	ʁ		θ	ʊ	ʋ		χ		ʒ
6	ɒ	ꞵ	ʗ	ɖ	ɜ		ɡ	ɧ		ʝ		ɭ	ɱ	ŋ	ɔ		ʕ	ɽ	ʃ	ʈ						ʐ
7				ʣ	ɞ	ɸ	ʛ	ħ	ɨ	ɟ		ɫ		ƞ	ɵ		ʡ	ɻ	ʂ	ƫ	ʉ			ʦ		ƻ
8		[	ɕ	ʤ	ʚ		ɤ	ʮ	ˑ	ʄ		ȴ	ɰ	ȵ	ø		ʢ	ɺ	ʆ	ȶ	ˌ	|		ʧ		ʑ
9	æ	]		ʥ	ɘ		ˠ	ʯ	ː	‿		ɮ		ɲ	œ		ʖ	ɼ		ᶿ	ˈ	‖		ʨ		ʓ

IPA special characters: Enter digit (row header) first, then letter (column header)
	a	b	c	d	e	f	g	h	i	j	k	l	m	n	ö	p	q	r	s	t	ü	v	w	x	y	z
1	̽	᷄		̄	̈				̂	̏	̑		᷈	᷅	̚	̊	́	̃	̇	̋	̌		̀		̆	͡
2	̪	̴	̢	̬	̤	̜	̹	̙	̞	̘	̯	̺	̫		̝	̥	̗	̰	̣	̩	̟	̼	̖	̡	̠	̻
3		/	)			ʻ	ʼ	[	˧	]	ꜛ	ꜜ	‖	|	˨	˩	ˑ	˞		˹	˦	ˈ	ː	(	˥	
4	,		⸩					{	˕	}	↗	↘			˔		ˏ		.	ˌ	˖		ˎ	⸨	˗	‿

Examples:

The input sequence – r – 5 yields ʁ.
The input sequence – ö – 6 yields ɔ, the subsequent input sequence – 2 – r complements this to ɔ̰ (open o with tilde below).

The following common IPA special characters can be entered using shorter key sequences:

- ː (Length mark): – . (dot; alternatively – :)
- ˑ (half length mark): – , (comma)
- ˈ (primary stress): – +
- ˌ (secondary stress): – -
- ‖ (major intonation group): – #

=== Input of Greek characters ===
The "Greek Special Selector and horn key" (Alt Gr+ü) can be used to enter all characters of the Greek alphabet, both for use as symbols in scientific and technical texts and for entering short Greek texts. All diacritical marks used in classical Ancient Greek also can be entered.

The following table complies with the international standard ISO/IEC 9995-9. However, since the selector key used here also functions as a dead key for applying the Vietnamese horn (dấu móc) to the letters o and u, the umlauts ö and ü are used instead for Greek input. The aforementioned standard contains the "comma above" (for spiritus lenis) in a different table, which is why the column "ß" has been added here.

	a	b	c	d	e	f	g	h	i	j	k	l	m	n	ö	p	q	r	s	t	ü	v	w	x	y	z	ß
⇧	Α	Β	Ψ	Δ	Ε	Φ	Γ	Η	Ι	Ξ	Κ	Λ	Μ	Ν	Ο	Π	͂	Ρ	Σ	Τ	Θ	Ω	̔	Χ	Υ	Ζ	
	α	β	ψ	δ	ε	φ	γ	η	ι	ξ	κ	λ	μ	ν	ο	π	Ι	ρ	σ	τ	θ	ω	ς	χ	υ	ζ	̓

Table arranged according to the Greek alphabet:

	a	b	g	d	e	z	h	ü	i	k	l	m	n	j	ö	p	r	s	t	y	f	x	c	v	w	q	ß
⇧	Α	Β	Γ	Δ	Ε	Ζ	Η	Θ	Ι	Κ	Λ	Μ	Ν	Ξ	Ο	Π	Ρ	Σ	Τ	Υ	Φ	Χ	Ψ	Ω	̔	͂	
	α	β	γ	δ	ε	ζ	η	θ	ι	κ	λ	μ	ν	ξ	ο	π	ρ	σ	τ	υ	φ	χ	ψ	ω	ς	Ι	̓

Diacritical marks are entered as follows, always after the letter (if entered later, they appear to the left of the cursor):

- Circumflex (Perispoméni, different from the circumflex of the Latin script): – Q (uppercase letter!)
- Spiritus lenis (Psili, Smooth breathing #Coronis #coronis, comma above): – ß
- Spiritus asper (Dasía, mirrored comma above): – W (uppercase letter!)
- Iota subscriptum: – q (lowercase letter)
- Acute accent (oxía, tonos), grave accent (baría) and trema (dialytika) are entered without by double actuating of, and respectively.

Example: The input sequence – v yields ω, the subsequent input – W – – Q – – q – supplements this to ᾧ (Omega with spiritus asper, circumflex and iota subscriptum), if correct Unicode character composing is supported by software and font.

For Modern Greek texts, especially for proper names processed in accordance with DIN 91379, the tonos (acute accent) on all vowels and the dialytika (trema) on the letters ι and υ can also be entered as dead keys. Example: – – i gives ί (iota with tonos). The combination of tonos + dialytika on the lowercase letters ι and υ is generated for this purpose with the dead key sequence – (since a sequence of three dead keys cannot be easily implemented in all keyboard drivers).

=== Input of special letters and characters used in linguistics ===
The "comma below" key (Alt Gr+k) can be used to enter letters for special user groups and special linguistic characters, as listed in the following tables.

Click letters for languages of Namibia
Letter	Input	Alternate input (Note: according to an earlier version of the German keyboard standard, left for compatibility in the current version)	Description
ǀ	1	'	Click letter consisting of one stroke
ǁ	2	"	Click letter consisting of two strokes
ǂ	3	#	Click letter consisting of three strokes
ǃ	4	!	Click letter similar to an exclamation mark

Transcription of Egyptian hieroglyphs
	Letter (Note: In transcription, usually only lowercase letters are used. However, Unicode contains uppercase forms e.g. to be used in headlines.)	Input	Description
Egyptological alef	ꜣ/Ꜣ	b/B	Egyptological alef
Egyptological ain	ꜥ/Ꜥ	c/C	Egyptological ain
Egyptological yod	ꞽ/Ꞽ	i/I	Egyptological yod

Other characters used in linguistics
Char.	Input	Description
ƒ/Ƒ	f/F	The lowercase letter (Florin sign) is the currency symbol for the Netherlands Antillean guilder and of the historic Dutch guilder, and is sometimes used for the f-number in photography.
ƕ/Ƕ	h/H	Transliteration of the Gothic letter 𐍈, preferred to the digraph hv
ɂ/Ɂ	q/Q	Letter indicating a glottal stop, used in some dialect orthographies and e.g. in Canadian minority languages, e.g. Chipewyan
ɼ	r	Long r as used in some Irish fonts
℞	R	"Prescription take" symbol, indicates prescription drugs
ƿ/Ƿ	w/W	Wynn (letter used in Old English texts)
ȝ/Ȝ	y/Y	Yogh (letter used in Middle English and Older Scots texts)
ȥ/Ȥ	z/Z	Character used in some modern printings of Middle High German texts for a "z" denoting the sound /s/
⸤ / ⸥	( / )	Low half brackets
⸢ / ⸣	[ / ]	High half brackets
⸗	=	Slanted double hyphen
⦀	|	Triple vertical bar
⸮	?	Mirrored question mark, used e.g. as a form of the irony mark
‵ / ‶	′ / ″	Mirrored single and double prime

=== Input of special mathematical symbols ===
In addition to various common mathematical symbols that are already included in the basic assignment or can be entered using the Extra Selector key according to the tables above, a selection of more specialized mathematical symbols can be entered using the "Math Special Selector or ring key" (Alt Gr+o). The selector key only produces a ring accent or an encirclement for symbols marked by colored table cells.

	a	b	c	d	e	f	g	h	i	j	k	l	m	n	o	p	q	r	s	t	u	v	w	x	y	z	ä	ö	ü	ß
⇧	Å	⇎	ℂ	∆	∄	∴	⊄	ℏ	∝	⊅	⊇	∩	⇏	ℕ	∠	℗	ℚ	ℝ	∇	∟	Ů	∧	ʬ	ℵ	∢	ℤ	∌	∉	∦	
	å	⇔	∛	∂	∃	∵	⊂	ℎ	∞	⊃	⊆	∪	⇒	⇐	∡	∏	∀	√	↔	⊥	ů	∨	ẘ	✕	ẙ	⚡︎	∋	∈	∥	∫

×	/	(	)	[	]	=	+	*	~	#	<	>	.	;	:	·	-
⊗	∕	❲	❳	⟦	⟧	≝	⊕	∗	⸛	∎	≪	≫	⋅	⇌	∶	∙	⊖

Some of the assignments to letters are based on the English name of the symbol, such as infinity, root, cube root.

=== Input of additional special characters using the strike-through key ===
Using the strike-through key (Alt Gr+ä) followed by a digit or a special character key, additional bullet symbols, dingbats, and decorative characters can be entered according to the following table:

1	2	3	4	5	6	7	8	9	0
◾	◽︎	❑	❖	‣	➤	⮚	✗	✘	✔ (Note: This is a bold version of the check mark (in contrast to the one that is entered by – :).)

,	;	.	°	·	<	=	>	-	~	^	%	(	)	[	]	+	*	#	'	|	/	?
◁	□	●	◌	◉	☙	❦	❧	⸺	⁓	ˆ (Note: This is a raised free-standing caron, in contrast to the larger caron which is entered by ^ – Space. The latter is the form appropriate for use in programming languages.)	℔	﴾	﴿	⁅	⁆	⌘	⁂	※	♪	✝ (Note: This is the Latin cross which differs from the dagger (which is entered by – #) by always having a shape resembling two crossed narrow rectangles.)	℅	�

=== Input of additional diacritical marks ===
With special combinations of two dead keys entered in succession, additional diacritical marks can be entered (especially for transliterations and linguistic texts) according to the following table:

Result	Resulting Unicode character	Input sequence
̐	U+0310 combining candrabindu (Note: To be entered after entering the base character. If entered into an existing text, the diacritical mark will appear on the base character to the left of the cursor.)	– (overdot – breve)
̓	U+0313 combining comma above	– ß (Greek – ß)
̭	U+032D combining circumflex accent below (Note: To be entered as a chained dead key pair before entering the base character. Together with the corresponding base letters, this produces the letters Ḓ/ḓ/Ḙ/ḙ/Ḽ/ḽ/Ṋ/ṋ/Ṱ/ṱ/Ṷ/ṷ for Tshivenda, one of the official languages of South Africa.)	– (caron – circumflex)
̥	U+0325 combining ring below	– (caron – ring)
͟	U+035F combining double macron below (Note: Diacritical mark for a letter pair: to be entered after the first and before the second character. ; If entered into an existing text, it appears under the basic letters to the left and right of the cursor.)	– (caron – macron below)
͜	U+035C combining double breve below	– (caron – breve)
̭	U+032D combining circumflex accent below	– (comma below – circumflex)
̍	U+030D combining vertical line above	– (comma below – acute accent)
̏	U+030F combining double grave accent	– (comma below – grave accent)
̅	U+0305 combining overline (Note: Overline connects when applied to several consecutive characters; e.g. it is suited for generating a vinculum over repeating decimal digits.)	– (comma below – macron)
̯	U+032F combining inverted breve below	– (comma below – breve)
͘	U+0358 combining dot above right	– (comma below – overdot)
̒	U+0312 combining turned comma above	– (comma below – hook)
̕	U+0315 combining comma above right	– (comma below – horn)
̲	U+0332 combining low line (Note: Underline connects when applied to several consecutive characters.)	– (comma below – macron below)
᪷	U+1AB7 combining open mark below (Note: The straight hook below is used in some Low German orthographies, e.g. in works of Fritz Reuter.)	– (comma below – ogonek)

=== Input of spaces and other invisible characters ===
The standard space is entered using the space bar. This function does not change if the Shift key ⇧ is pressed simultaneously or if Caps Lock is activated. The combination Alt Gr+Space produces a non-breaking space. For the narrow non-breaking space, which is used more frequently in advanced typography, especially in abbreviations according to DIN 5008, there is the dedicated key combination Alt Gr+c. Thus, a dedicated key with an easily recognizable symbol is available for this purpose.

Overall, the following spaces and other invisible characters can be entered:

Resulting Unicode character	Input sequence
U+0020 space	Space
U+00A0 no-break space	Alt Gr+Space
U+202F narrow no-break space	Alt Gr+c
U+200A hair space	– Space
U+2007 figure space	– ß
U+2009 thin space	– ü
U+2003 em space	– Ü
U+200B zero width space	– ö
U+200D zero width joiner	– Ö
U+200C zero width non-joiner	– m

=== Superscripting, subscripting and encirclement of letters ===
Special combinations of two dead keys entered in succession can be used to superscript, subscript, or encircle the 26 letters a...z and A...Z. This effectively enters the special Unicode characters that have the corresponding appearance. While Unicode contains encircled variants for all of these letters, it does not contain superscript or subscript variants for all of these letters (in particular, there are no subscript uppercase letters at all). The input option described here only works for superscript and subscript if the target letter is available in the Basic Multilingual Plane of Unicode. On the other hand, this character selection also works independently of software in unformatted plain text. In addition, the correct Unicode characters are used for languages in which superscript letters are elements of spelling, or used in linguistic texts (for example, about the Proto-Indo-European language).

- The key sequence – (breve – circumflex) causes superscripting for the letter entered after it.
- The key sequence – (breve – caron) causes subscripting.
- The key sequence – (breve – ring) causes encirclement.

== Variant "E2" ==
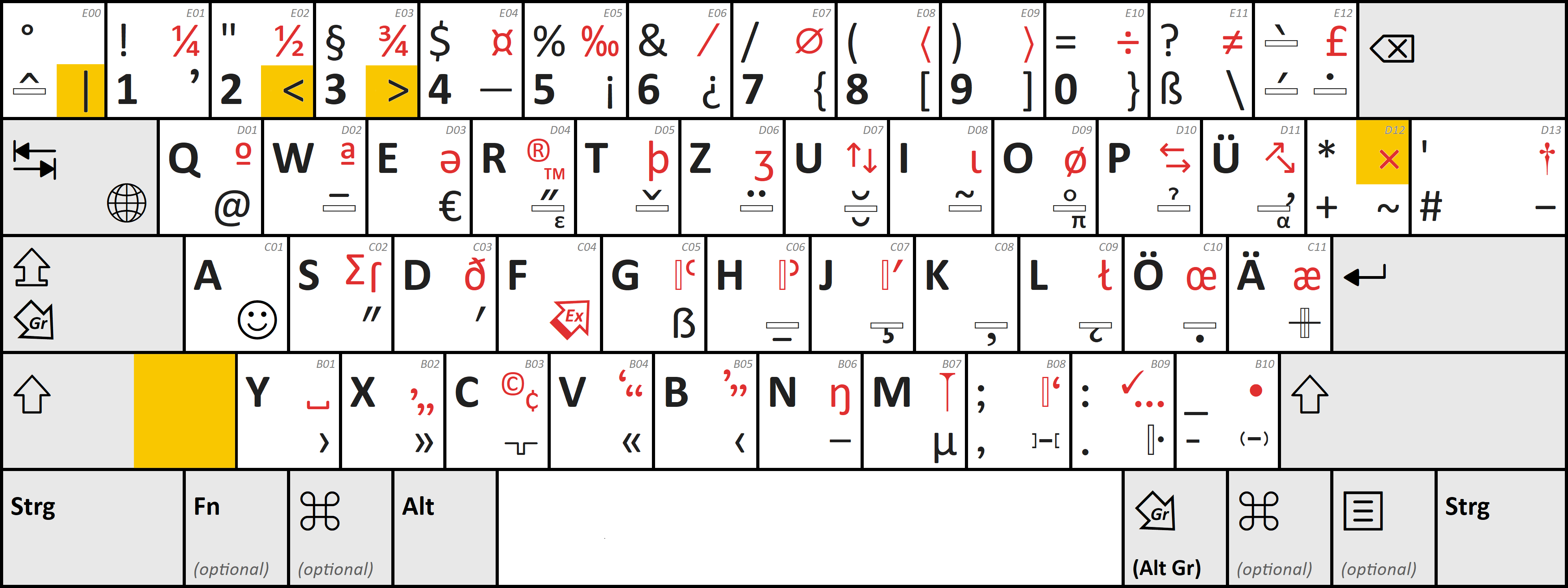
German extended keyboard layout "E2" according to DIN 2137-01:2023-08 (differences to layout "E1" marked)

Besides the German extended keyboard layout "E1", The German standard DIN 2137 specifies a variant "E2". This is intended to be used on keyboards whose hardware resembles the key arrangement of the standard US QWERTY keyboard, thus lacking one key compared to the standard German QWERTZ hardware (on the right side of the left shift key, thus enabling a broader left shift key). This allows to produce e.g. special keyboard hardware in small numbers (e.g. for persons with restricted mobility), for which the German version then only has to deviate from the US version in the key labelling, but not in the key arrangement.

As the superscripted digits ^{2} and ^{3}, which occupy a separate position on the "E1" layout as well as on the basic German keyboard layout, can be entered by the key combinations +2 and +3 using the extended layout, they no longer need a separate position. The latter also applies to the ± symbol, which can be entered by ++. Therefore, the characters "<", ">", and "|", which are positioned on the key to the right of the left shift key on the "E1" layout, are moved to those positions on the "E2" layout (together with an additional move of the "×" to give the "|" a more prominent position).

== Availability ==
=== Hardware ===
Since December 2024, keyboards and keycap sets with labelling according to the German extended keyboard layout "E1" are available from a specialized German supplier.

=== Software ===
Since the 24H2 update for Windows 11, the German extended keyboard layouts "E1" and "E2" are available in Microsoft Windows as "German extended (E1)" and "German extended (E2)".

For Microsoft Windows 8, 10 and 11, a driver with extended functions is available from a private developer, among other solutions. In particular, a variant is also available where the left key of the middle row ("ASDFG row") functions as a left Alt Gr key in accordance with the recommendation of the standard, but still has the shift lock function when pressed simultaneously with the Control key.

MacOS offers a layout "German – Standard" in addition to the usual German keyboard layout, which is largely compatible with the German extended layout "E1" in Microsoft Windows.

A driver for Linux is available from component xkeyboard-config 2.44 of the X Window System. The keyboard layout can be selected, for example, with setxkbmap de e1 or setxkbmap de e2.

== See also ==
- Latin International keyboard layout
