= ISO/IEC 9995 =

ISO standard: computer keyboard layouts

ISO/IEC 9995 Information technology — Keyboard layouts for text and office systems is an ISO/IEC standard series defining layout principles for computer keyboards. It provides the base for national and industry standards which define such layouts.

The project of this standard was adopted by ISO in 1985 under the proposition of Dr Yves Neuville. The ISO/IEC 9995 standard series dates back to 1994 and has undergone several updates over the years. The last major revision was published in December 2025 and January 2026.

== Parts ==
The ISO/IEC 9995 standard series currently (as of February 2026) consists of the following parts:

- ISO/IEC 9995-1:2026 General principles governing keyboard layouts
- ISO/IEC 9995-2:2026 Alphanumeric section
- ISO/IEC 9995-3:2026 Latin International keyboard layout
  The content of this part has completely changed compared to its predecessor version:
  ISO/IEC 9995-3:2010 Complementary layouts of the alphanumeric zone of the alphanumeric section
- ISO/IEC 9995-4:2025 Numeric section
- ISO/IEC 9995-5:2009 Editing and function section
- ~~ISO/IEC 9995-6:2006 Function section~~ (withdrawn)
- ISO/IEC 9995-7:2009 Symbols used to represent functions with Amendment 1 (2012)
  As of February 2026, this part is under revision, and a new version is expected.
- ISO/IEC 9995-8:2009 Allocation of letters to the keys of a numeric keypad
- ISO/IEC 9995-9:2026 Groups and mechanisms for multilingual and multiscript input
- ISO/IEC 9995-10:2025 Conventional symbols and methods to represent graphic characters not uniquely recognizable by their glyph on keyboards and in documentation
- ISO/IEC 9995-11:2026 Functionality and labelling of dead keys
- ISO/IEC 9995-12:2020 Keyboard group selection

The parts ISO/IEC 9995-5, ISO/IEC 9995-8, and ISO/IEC 9995-12 were not affected by the revision of the ISO/IEC 9995 series published in 2025/2026.

The part ISO 9995-6:2006 Function section was withdrawn in October 2009, as its content was integrated into ISO/IEC 9995-5:2009 Editing and function section (whose prior version was titled ISO/IEC 9995-5:2006 Editing section).

== Part 1: "General principles governing keyboard layouts" ==
ISO/IEC 9995-1:2026 provides a fundamental description of keyboards suitable for text and office systems, and defines several terms which are used throughout the ISO/IEC 9995 standard series.

=== Physical division and reference grid ===
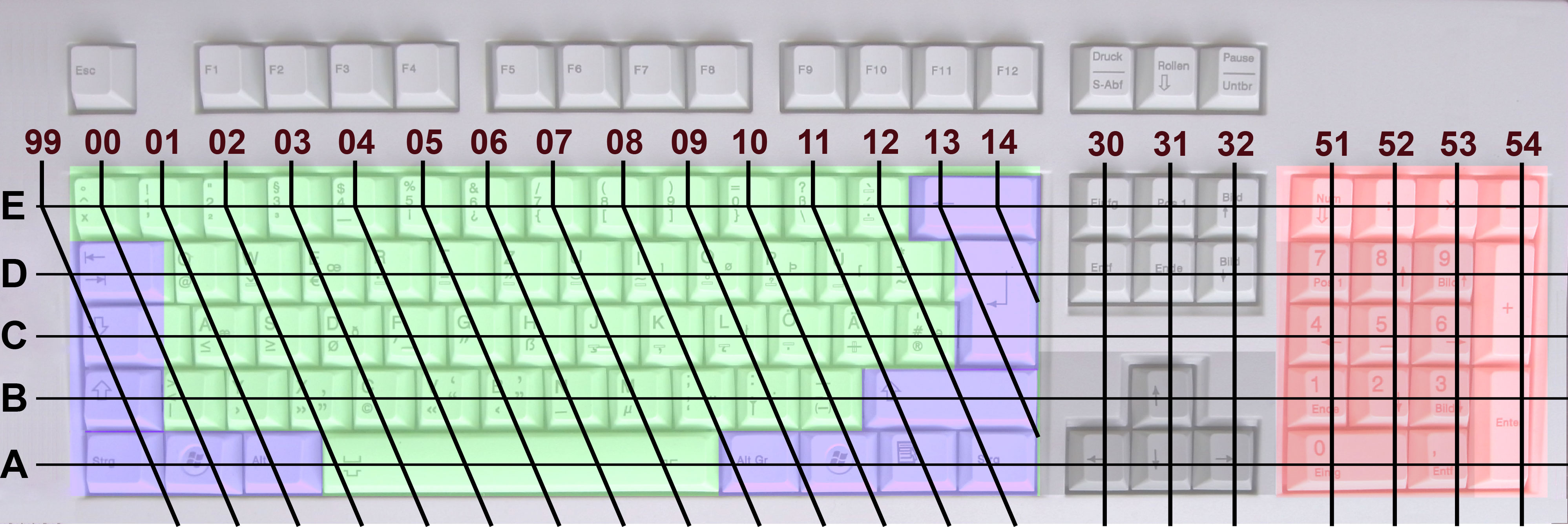
Keyboard-sections-zones-grid-ISOIEC-9995-1

The figure shows the division of a keyboard into sections, which are subdivided into zones.

- alphanumeric section
  - alphanumeric zone (indicated by green coloring)
  - function zones (indicated by light purple coloring)
- numeric section
  - numeric zone (indicated by darker red coloring)
  - function zone (indicated by lighter red coloring)
- editing and function section (in fact covering all parts of the keyboard which do not belong to the alphanumeric or numeric section)
  - cursor key zone (indicated by darker grey coloring)
  - editing function zone (indicated by lighter grey coloring)

The presence of a numeric section is not required by the standard. Also, the standard does not prevent a numeric section from being placed left of the alphanumeric section.

By means of the reference grid, each key can be identified by a unique combination of a letter (indicating the row) and a sequence of two digits (indicating the column). E.g., the key visually marked as "1" on several layouts is identified as "Key E01". The labeling rules do allow for function keys to be arranged in a position other than above the alphanumeric section, or to be arranged in more than one row (thus, e.g. an AT keyboard is compliant to the standard):

- Columns containing editing or function keys are to be numbered from 60 on when placed beyond a right numeric section, or from 80 downwards when placed to the left of the alphanumeric section.
- Rows above the alphanumeric section are to be labeled from K on, and rows below the space key are to be labeled from Z downwards.

The grid may be angled (as shown in the figure within the alphanumeric section), or squared (thus, keyboards where the alphanumeric keys are ordered in pure vertical columns are compliant to the standard).

The standard does not constrain the numbers of rows and columns in the alphanumeric section.

=== Levels and groups ===
The selection of level and group during the input of a character (e.g. by means of a shift key, an AltGr key, or a group selection key or key sequence) is specified in ISO/IEC 9995-2.

==== Levels ("unshifted" "shifted", "AltGr", "AltGr+Shift") ====
The characters that can be input by the keys in the alphanumeric section are usually organized in levels. For two-cased scripts like Latin, the basic level ("Level 1") contains lower-case letters, while Level 2 contains capital letters (therefore, these levels are usually called "unshifted" and "shifted"). For characters that are not letters (like punctuation marks), no rules are given regarding their distribution among the levels. While digits are commonly in Level 1, there are exceptions (e.g. the French keyboard layout).

The standard allows for up to four levels.

- Characters in the third level are usually (but not mandatory by the standard) selected by means of an AltGr key.
- Characters in the fourth level are usually selected by pressing them together with an AltGr key and a Shift key. Unless a dedicated key or key combination exists (like pressing ⇧ Shift+AltGr and releasing it before entering the key whose fourth level character is to be input, resembling a sticky key feature), this requires an uncomfortable "guitar chord grip" using three fingers simultaneously. Therefore, the fourth level should be used only for obscure or rarely used characters or other specific cases. Its characters do not need to be shown on the keytops, but only in instruction documents for the specific keyboard layout.

==== Groups ====
If the organization into three or four levels is not sufficient or considered appropriate to accommodate all characters to be contained in a specific layout, then "groups" may be defined, which then constitute a higher hierarchical unit than levels. Thus, each such group is usually subdivided into up to four levels. Common examples are layouts allowing the input of characters of different scripts. On the Japanese keyboard layout, the kana constitutes the second group. The Canadian Québec layout (1992) and the German E1 layout (2018, updated 2023) allow the input of considerably more characters than their preceding editions, to overcome the historic limits of mechanical typewriters.

Mechanisms to switch between groups are provided in ISO/IEC 9995-2, ISO/IEC 9995-9, and ISO/IEC 9995-12.

==== "Extra characters" and "Extra selector" ====
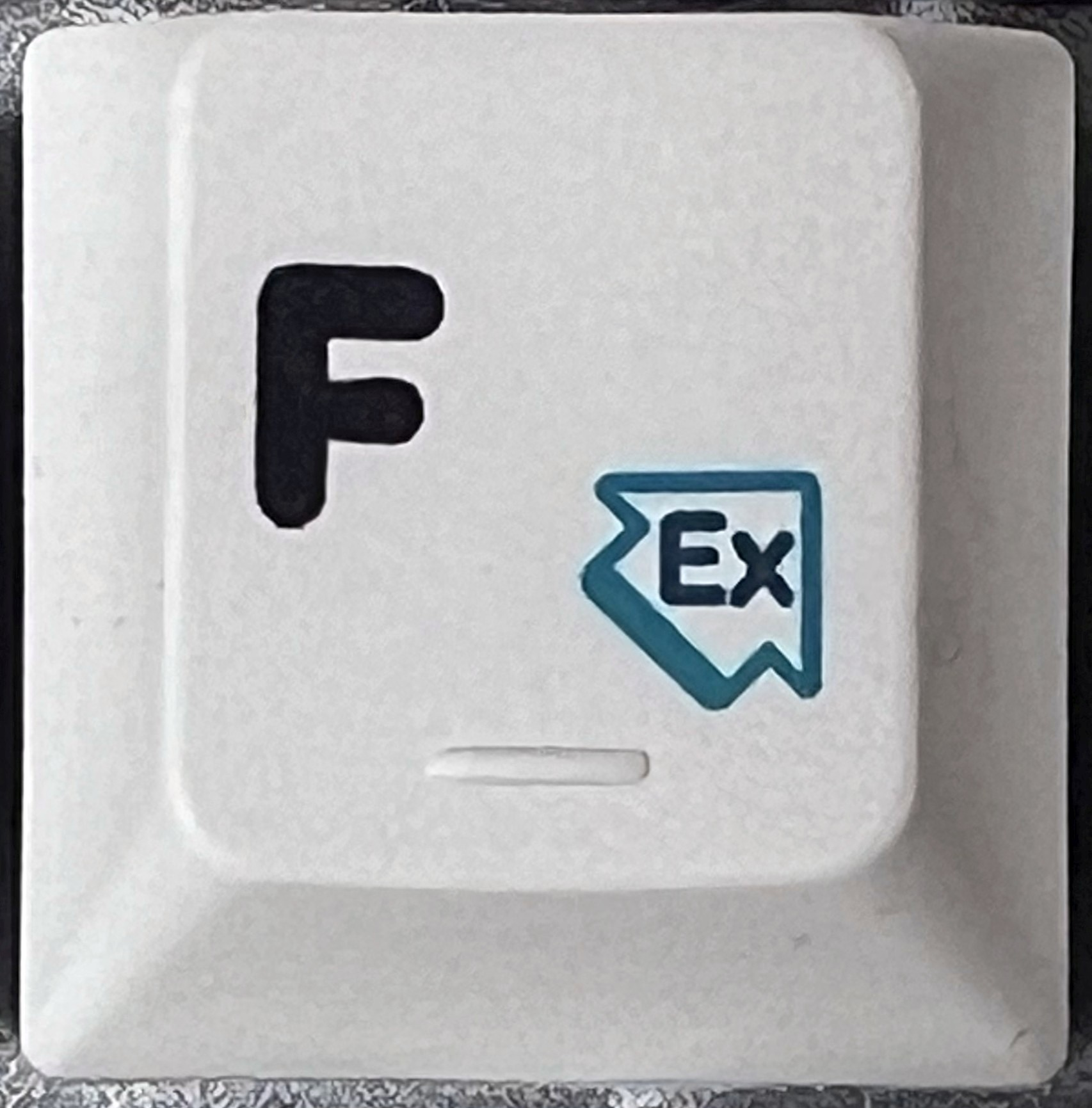
German E1 key with "Extra selector" as AltGr+f

If characters contained in a "secondary group" are a supplement of the "primary group" (rather than being characters of a different script), this secondary group may be called "extra characters". Then, a "group 2 single-select" key or key combination (as defined in ISO/IEC 9995-2) causes only the next key actuation to yield the character of the secondary group, while the system switches back to the primary group after that. Such a key or key combination may be named "Extra selector". The keyboard symbol for this function is or, depending on whether the characters of the secondary group are shown on the whole right part or on the top right part of the keytop. The German extended layout E1 uses as a variant of the latter symbol, as the key combination there is named "Extra-Wahltaste" (German for "extra selector").

=== Depictions on the keytops ===
ISO/IEC 9995-1:2026 specifies three ways of key labelling and symbol positioning:

- columnar placement,
- group-1-priorized placement,
- level-4-including placement.

==== Columnar placement ====
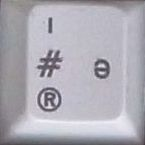
Key of the outdated German T2 layout (2 groups, 3 levels)

Here, the level is indicated by the row where the character is depicted on the keytop:

- Level 2 ("shifted") above of Level 1 ("unshifted")
- Level 3 ("AltGr") below Level 1 ("unshifted").

The group is indicated by the column on the keytop:

- The first or "primary group" at the left keytop border
- The second or "secondary group" at the right keytop border
- Additional groups (if existing) in between.

When letters on a case pair are associated with a key, only the capital character needs to be shown on the keytop for the primary group, while the lowercase character only is shown for the secondary group.

Thus, on the depicted key of the German T2 layout (which is outdated since 2018), in the primary group are the characters # in Level 1 (unshifted), ' in Level 2 (shifted), and ® in Level 3 (accessed by the AltGr key). In the secondary group, there is the lowercase letter ə in Level 1 (unshifted) and its capital counterpart Ə in Level 2 (shifted).

In prior editions of the standard, this was the only way specified in there. As for stacking three characters on a keytop, the symbols have to be small enough, which posed problems regarding legibility. Therefore, the other two ways were developed. However, prior editions described the possibility to place Level 3 characters on the front of the keycaps. As keyboards produced since the 2020s predominantly have flat keys without providing enough space for readable symbols on the front, this possibility was dropped in the revision published 2026.

==== Group-1-priorized placement ====
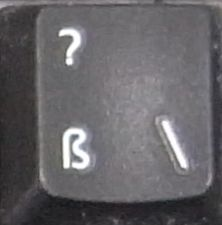
Key of the standard German layout

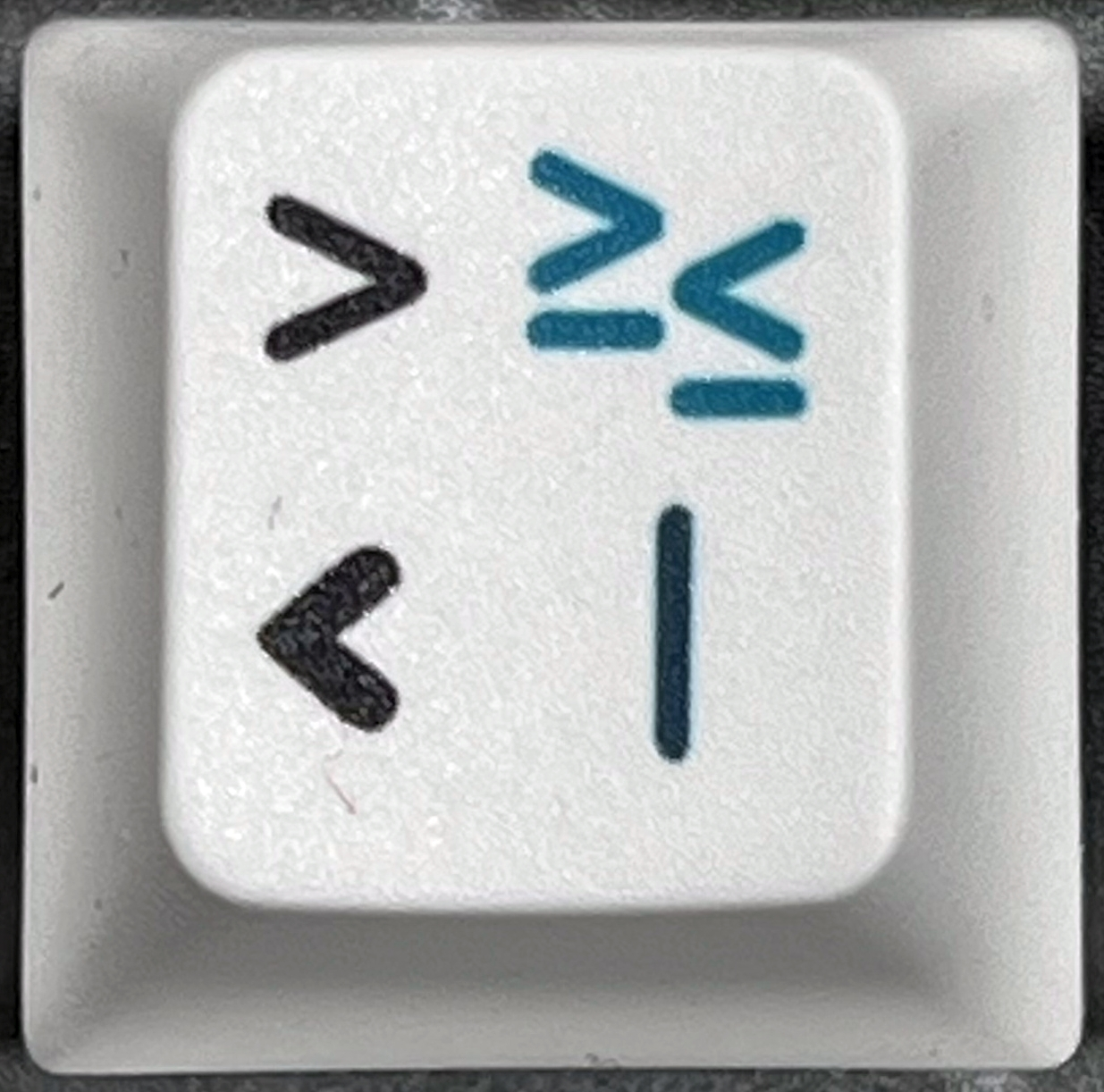
Key of the extended German E1 layout

For layouts containing only one group, characters in Level 3 may be depicted in the lower right corner of a keytop, to allow larger depictions than the columnar placement. For instance, on the depicted key of the German standard (T1) layout, the "\" is in Level 3 (of the only defined group), to be accessed by the AltGr key.

For layouts containing a secondary group with two levels, its characters can be depicted in the upper right quadrant of the keytops (preferably using a different color or hue), by the following rules:

- If the two characters are the lowercase and uppercase forms of a letter, only the lowercase form is to be depicted. Thus, that letter can be shown in the same size as the letters contained in the primary group.
- Otherwise, they are to be depicted side by side, the Level 2 character (which is to be entered by the shift key) on the left and recognizable nearer to the top than the Level 1 character.

For instance, the characters of the depicted key of the German E1 layout are to be entered as follows:

- The "|" belongs to Level 3 of the primary group and is to be entered using the AltGr key.
- The "≥" belongs to Level 2 of the secondary group and is to be entered using the "group 2 single-select" key, followed by > (i.e. ⇧ Shift+<).
- The "≤" belongs to Level 1 of the secondary group and is to be entered using followed by <.

==== Level-4-including placement ====
This placement addresses layouts where the majority of the characters in level 3 and 4 are the lowercase and uppercase variants for additional letters, as it is the case for the US-International keyboard layout.

== Part 2: "Alphanumeric section" ==
ISO/IEC 9995-2:2026 specifies requirements for the keys contained in the alphanumeric section (see the description of ISO/IEC 9995-1 above). That section consists of the "alphanumeric zone" (containing graphic keys) and the left and right "function zones" (containing function keys).

=== Graphic keys ===
According to the standard, a "graphic key" is a key used to input characters, rather than being a pure function key. This includes the space bar since the ISO/IEC 9995-2:2026 edition (while predecessor editions excluded it explicitly).

The alphanumeric zone (being a part of the alphanumeric section) has to contain 47 or more graphic keys used to input characters, including the space bar which has to be placed in the lowest row (row A according to the reference grid specified in ISO/IEC 9995-1). Also, there must be:

- at least 12 keys in row E (the uppermost row) in positions E00 to E15, containing all keys to input the decimal digits,
- at least 12 keys in row D in positions D01 to D15,
- at least 11 keys in row C in positions C01 to C15,
- at least 10 keys in row B in positions B00 to B11.

The space bar has to expand at least over the positions A04 to A06. This implies that Japanese keyboards containing muhenkan, henkan, and the Katakana/Hiragana switch keys (the first one left, the other two right of the space bar) are compliant to the standard regardless of their short space bar.

Layouts which are designed for the Latin script must contain at least the 26 basic letters A...Z and a...z, the decimal digits 0...9, the characters # and @, and the following characters contained in ISO 646: ! " % & ' * ( ) + , - . / : ; < = > ? _ and space.

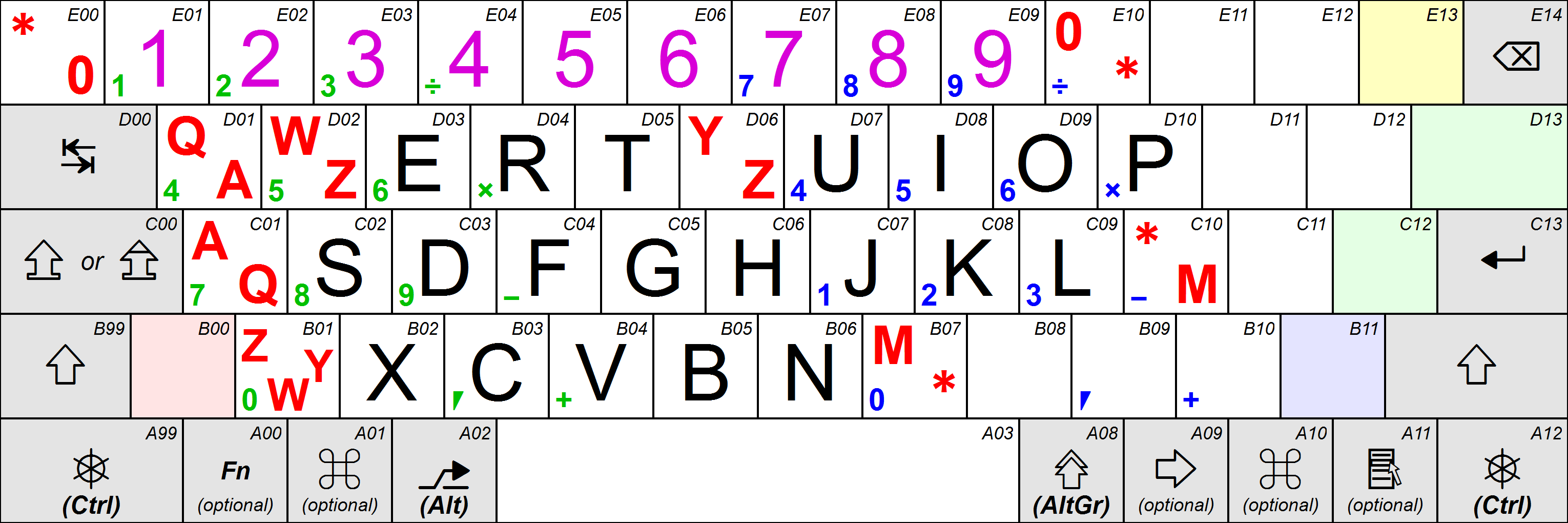

Alphanumeric section of a keyboard, showing several details specified in ISO/IEC 9995-2:2026
- The keys shown grey in the figure, all being function keys, constitute the left and right function zones, while all other keys constitute the alphanumeric zone. The reference grid position of any function key may vary according to the specifications listed below. Especially, on a keyboard with considerably more than 47 keys in the alphanumeric zone, the right function keys will get higher column numbers.
- The position E13 (shown yellow) often is used to extend the backspace key at E14.
- At least one of the positions D13 and C12 (shown green) is commonly used to extend the return key at C13.
- The position B00 (shown pink) is used to extend the left shift key at B99 in some layouts (e.g. in the common US layout).
- The position B11 (shown blue) is commonly used to extend the right shift key at B12.

The symbols shown for the function keys are specified in ISO/IEC 9995-7. Letterings which are commonly used instead of the symbols are shown in their English version in parentheses.

=== The harmonized 48–50 graphic key keyboard arrangement ===
Keyboards which comply with this narrower specification use all the 47 keys shown with white background (including the space bar) in the figure above as graphic keys (i.e. to input a character rather than being only a function key), and at least one more key of those shown with a colored background. As an exception, if a key E00 is not present or used as a function key (e.g as Escape key on compact keyboards), the key at position E13 is to be used as graphic key.

The standard does not require a keyboard layout to be compliant with these specific requests in order to comply with the standard itself. It only says that keyboards complying with this narrower specification can be called compliant with the harmonized keyboard arrangement.

For the 2026 edition of the standard, the criteria for this harmonized keyboard arrangement were reworked and substantially simplified, compared with the predecessor edition ISO/IEC 9995-2:2009. According to the latter edition, 48 graphic keys were required besides the space bar. This excluded the common US layout from complying with this, as its key arrangement contains only graphic 47 such keys (the 46 ones with white background in the picture above, not counting the space bar, above plus the key at D13). Also, the key arrangement which is used for many European layouts (using the additional key at position B00) is often called "ISO layout", as it was the only widespread key arrangement fully compliant with the "harmonized 48 graphic key keyboard arrangement", as it was called in the 2009 edition (explicitly not counting the space bar as a graphic key, in contrary to the 2026 edition).

=== Function keys ===
A tabulation key shall be present, occupying position D00 (i. e., the key may be wider, spanning over additional positions like D99 left of D00).

A key providing one of the functions Capitals lock (usually called "Caps Lock"), Level 2 lock (i. e. "Shift lock"), or Generalized lock shall be present, occupying the position C00. (The function "Generalized lock" is not specified in the ISO/IEC 9995 series). The specific way the Caps Lock or Shift Lock works (i. e. swapping the lock state by hitting the key, as it is usually implemented) is not specified in the ISO/IEC 9995 series. It is specified that this key may have another main function (for instance, acting as an additional Level 3 select key), and then the lock function is yielded e.g. when pressing it together with another key like the Control key or the Alternate key.

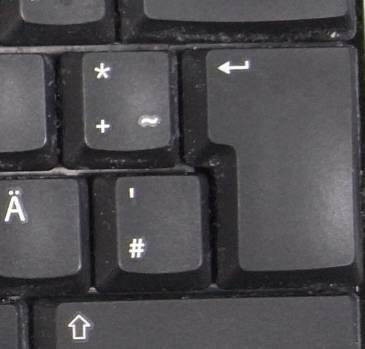
Return key on a German keyboard, spanning over two rows

A Return key has to be present, right of the character input keys in row C. It is recommended that it expands to row D (thus spanning over position D13 when located on position C13 as shown in the figure), as it e. g. does on the German layout.

A key providing one of the functions Backspace or Backward erase shall be present in row A or (as it is more common) Row E, right of the character input keys.

If at least one Alternate key (commonly called "Alt key") is present, it is to be positioned left of the space bar (or, if a function key specific to the writing system supported by the keyboard layout is there, left of that key).

If at least one Control key (commonly abbreviated "Ctrl") is present, it has to be placed leftmost in row A (as it is more common), or row B.

If a Function key (commonly abbreviated "Fn") is present, it is to be positioned left the space bar and left of an "Alternate" key, if such one is present. (It is allowed but explicitly not recommended to place the "Function" key left of the "Control" key.)

=== Level selection ===
To select the Level 2 (commonly called "shifted", see the subsection "Levels and Groups" of the section "ISO/IEC 9995-1" above), two keys shall be present in row B (commonly called Shift keys). The left one shall occupy position B99, while the right one shall be located right of the character input keys of that row. The exact function of these keys (commonly pressing them together with the affected character input key) is not specified in the standard. Thus, solutions where the shift key is pressed, then released before the character input key is pressed, are compliant with the standard.

If the keyboard layout contains a Level 3, at least one Level 3 select key (frequently marked AltGr) shall be present to select it. On keyboards compliant to the "harmonized 48–50 graphic key keyboard arrangement" (see above), such keys shall be placed in row A or row B. Like for the shift keys, the exact function of these keys (commonly pressing them together with the affected character input key) is not specified in the standard.

=== Numeric keypad emulation ===
For keyboards which do not contain a numeric keypad, the standard specifies two ways of the emulation of one within the alphanumeric section of a keyboard. One way, with mappings to keys in the left half of the alphanumeric section (shown green in the figure above in the section Graphic keys), emulates a numeric keypad with the digits 1,2,3 in the upper row. The other way, with mappings to keys in the right half (shown blue in that figure), emulates one with the digits 7,8,9 in the upper row. The standard does not specify any mechanism to switch to the numeric keypad functionality.

=== Allocation guidelines for layouts containing the Latin alphabet ===
An informative annex "Allocation guidelines" provides a basic pattern for arrangements of Latin letters, which in fact specifies a foundation for the kinds of keyboard layouts known as QWERTY, QWERTZ, or AZERTY. As this annex is not normative, it does not prevent other arrangements like the Dvorak keyboard or the Turkish F-keyboard being compliant to the ISO/IEC 9995 standard series.

The figure above (in the section Graphic keys) shows letters in black where a unique position is given, while the letters shown in red may alternatively occupy any of the positions where they are shown. Digits may be allocated on Level 0 (unshifted) or Level 1 (shifted). An asterisk in that figure indicates "any other character".

=== Key arrangements ===
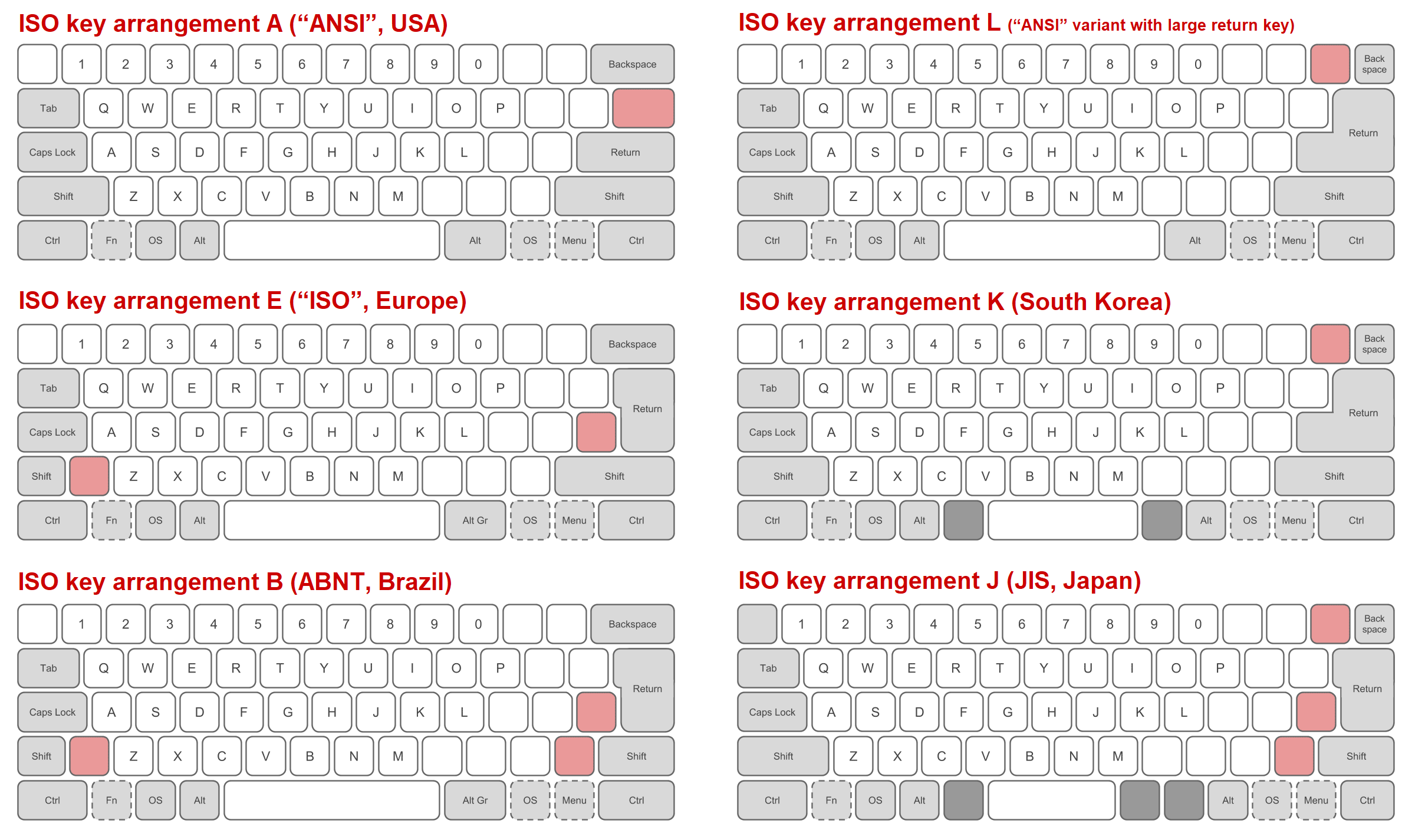
Key arrangements listed in ISO/IEC 9995-2:2026

An informative annex "Examples of key arrangements" was added to the 2026 edition of the standard. (The standard does not call them "layouts", as they only deal with physical arrangements of the keys and not with the characters which are mapped on these keys.) In this annex, six arrangements are listed and named, all compliant with the harmonized 48–50 graphic key keyboard arrangement, covering all widespread keyboard layouts:

- Key arrangement A: It has 48 graphic keys and uses position D13 for the 48th key. It is conformant e. g. with the US-American standard ANSI INCITS X3.154-1988. Therefore, it usually is called "ANSI layout".
- Key arrangement L: It is a variant of the "Key arrangement A"; it also has 48 graphic keys, but it uses position E13 for the 48th key and thus enables the Return Key to be considerably larger. It is used in some Asian countries.
- Key arrangement K: It is an extension of the "Key arrangement L" with the same arrangement of 48 graphic keys, but with two additional special function keys left and right of the space bar. It is used in South Korea; the additional function keys are used to switch between the Latin, Hangul, and Hanja scripts.
- Key arrangement E: It has 49 graphic keys and uses positions C12 and B00 for the 48th and 49th keys. It is conformant with many European standards, e. g. with the French standard NF Z71-300 and the German standard DIN 2137-01:2023-08. As this arrangement was the only one complying with the "harmonized 48 graphic key keyboard arrangement" as outlined in the predecessor edition ISO/IEC 9995-2:2009 of the standard, it usually is called simply "ISO layout". However, this designation may be considered as misleading now, as the 2026 edition of the standard does not emphasize any of the listed key arrangements.
- Key arrangement B: It has 50 graphic keys and uses positions C12, B00, and B11 for the 48th to 50th keys. It is conformant with the Brazilian standard ABNT NBR 10346 (1991).
- Key arrangement J: It has 49 graphic keys, uses position E00 for a function key, and uses positions E13, C12, and B11 for the 47th to 49th keys. It is used in Japan and conforms to a JIS standard. Beside the space bar, it provides additional function keys, which address the use of the different script systems in Japan.

== Part 3: "Latin International keyboard layout", previously "Complementary layouts of the alphanumeric zone of the alphanumeric section" ==
The purpose of this part is to enable users to find Latin letters beyond the 26 letters A...Z of the basic Latin alphabet on their keyboard and to type them directly, at least for widespread languages which need such extra letters. This was done in all versions published before 2026 (the last one in 2010) by defining a "common secondary group" (see below). Since the 2026 edition, this is done instead by defining a specific layout, the "Latin International keyboard layout".

=== Common secondary group ===
The predecessor versions of the current 2026 edition defined a common secondary layout ("common secondary group") for the alphanumeric keyboard. This is a set of characters to be engraved on the right part of the keytops. This was done by defining their position independent of the characters of the primary layout. Thus, e. g. the Yen symbol "¥" occupies the shifted position on the 6th letter key of the second row, whether this is the Y key on a QWERTY keyboard (like the US layout) or the Z key on a QWERTZ keyboard (like the German layout).

Characters of the common secondary group are accessed by typing a "group selector" key before. This could be a dedicated key (showing the symbol), or (if not present) pressing the Shift key and the AltGr key simultaneously and release them, before entering the key according to the character shown on the right part of the keytop.

==== 2002 edition ====
ISO/IEC 9995-3:2002 had the title Information technology — Keyboard layouts for text and office systems — Part 3: Complementary layouts of the alphanumeric zone of the alphanumeric section. It had specified a "common secondary group" based on the standardized Unicode subset MES-1. which contains characters used in several European languages using the Latin script. The "Canadian Keyboard Standard for the English and French Languages" (CSA keyboard) contains a secondary group (2a) which is a small part of that "common secondary group".

The "Common Secondary Group" as defined in ISO/IEC 9995-3:2002

==== 2010 edition ====
ISO/IEC 9995-3:2010 had defined a completely redesigned common secondary group, in response to criticism that only European languages were considered in the 2002 version. Consequently, it includes a considerably larger number of characters and diacritical marks, especially ones which are used in indigenous languages of the Americas. To achieve this, it made use of the "level 3", i.e. characters which are displayed in the lower third of the keytops and are to be entered by an AltGr key (or another special key combination like ⇧ Shift+Ctrl, if no AltGr key is present).

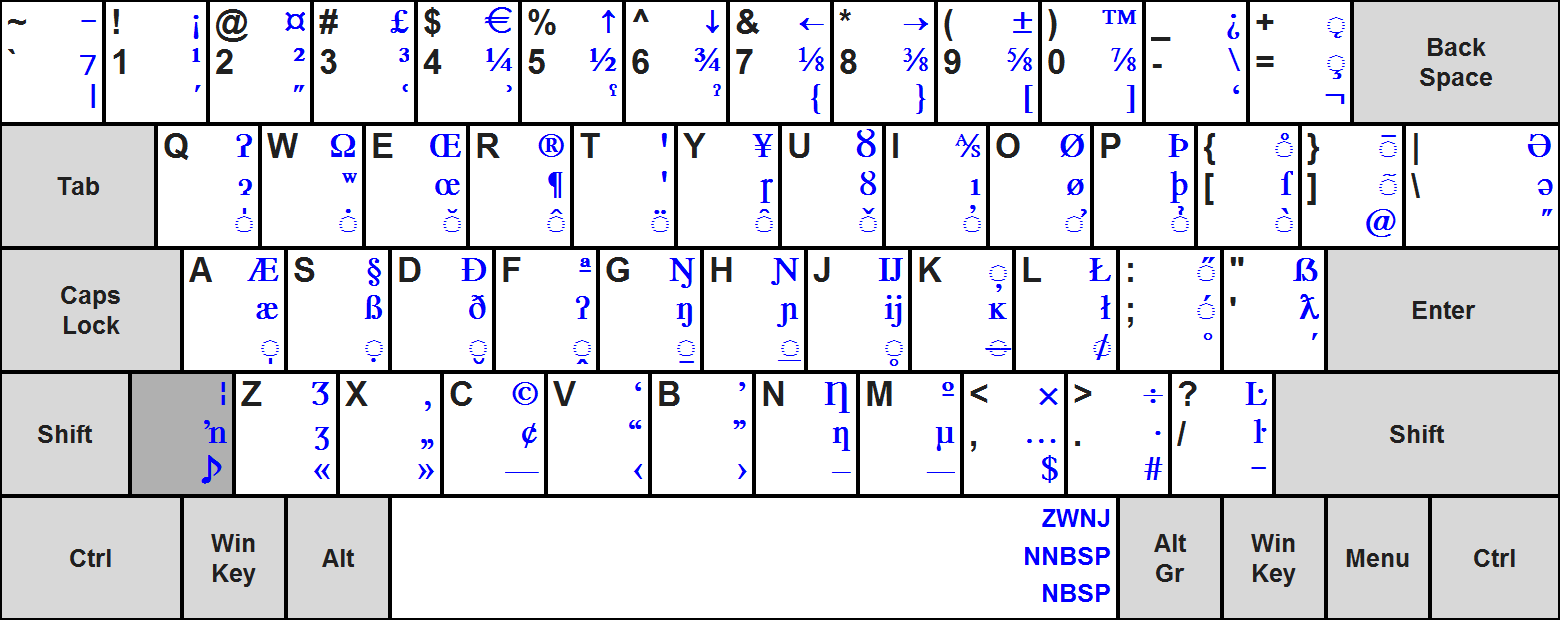

The "common secondary group" as defined in ISO/IEC 9995-3:2010 applied to the US keyboard layout

The diacritical marks contained in the common secondary group act as dead keys, i.e. they are to be entered before the base characters they apply to. This mechanism is also to be used for sequences of more than one diacritical marks, to write languages like Vietnamese and Navajo.

Moreover, ISO/IEC 9995-3:2010 defined a list of "Peculiar Characters which can be entered as combinations using diacritical marks". This list specifies combinations of a diacritical mark and a second key. E.g., symbols like the not-equal sign "≠" (Unicode U+2160) can be entered this way. Especially, letters with a horizontal stroke (like Serbo-Croatian Đ/đ, Maltese Ħ/ħ, or Comanche Ʉ/ʉ) are entered this way using the "horizontal stroke accent" located on the K key.
This list is no longer contained in the 2026 edition, as it was transferred in a revised form into ISO/IEC 9995-11:2015 Functionality of dead keys and repertoires of characters entered by dead keys. It is retained (revised again) in ISO/IEC 9995-11:2026 Functionality and labelling of dead keys.

For compatibility reasons, the 2010 edition additionally had listed the common secondary group of the 2002 edition as "outdated common secondary group".

=== Complementary Latin group layout (2002 and 2010 editions) ===
Additionally, for cases where no national keyboard layout is available, or to be used as an additional group on layouts designed for other scripts than Latin, the 2002 edition specified a "Complementary Latin group layout". The assignment shown with red background in the depiction shall occur once at one of the indicated positions.

As this concept has not found any widespread use, and as the layout does not contain characters like @ which became indispensable in the meanwhile, the layout was dropped completely in the 2026 edition.

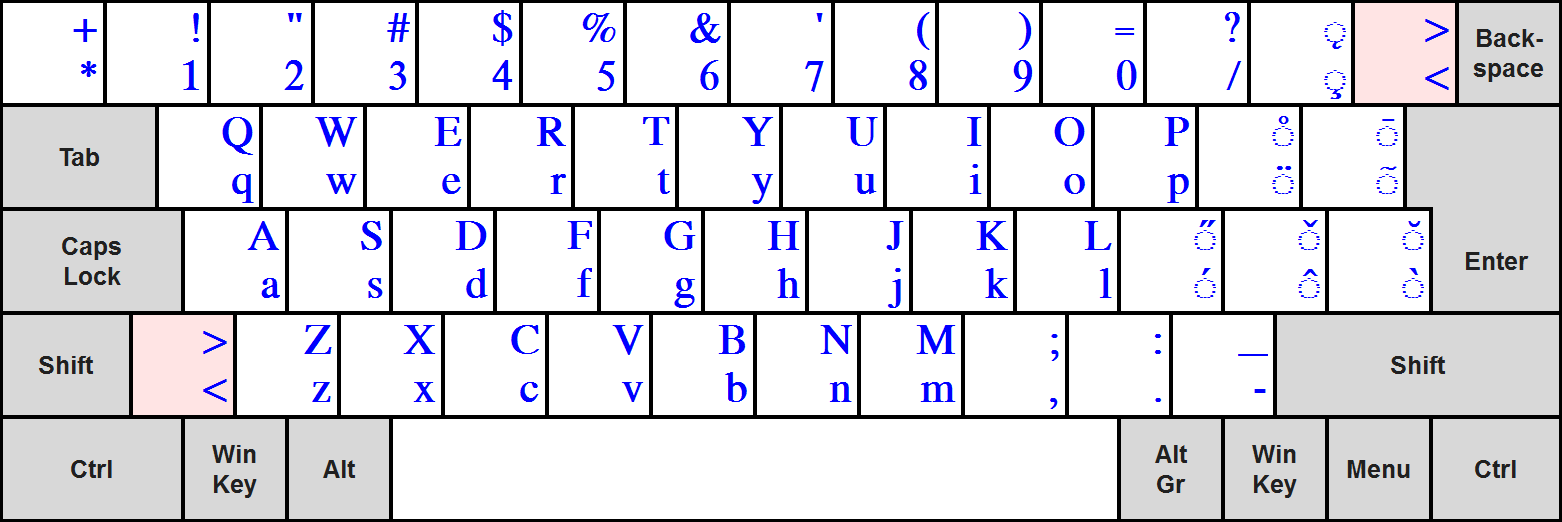

The "Complementary Latin group layout" according to ISO/IEC 9995-3:2010

=== Latin International keyboard layout (2026 edition) ===
As the idea of adding a "common secondary group" to existing layouts never has found widespread use, it was discarded at the revision of the ISO/IEC 9995 series which has led to its 2026 edition. Instead, a single complete layout has been defined, instead of a feature to be added to existing layouts. This resulted in a change of the title of ISO/IEC 9995-3:2026, which now is Information technology — Keyboard layouts for text and office systems — Part 3: Latin International keyboard layout.

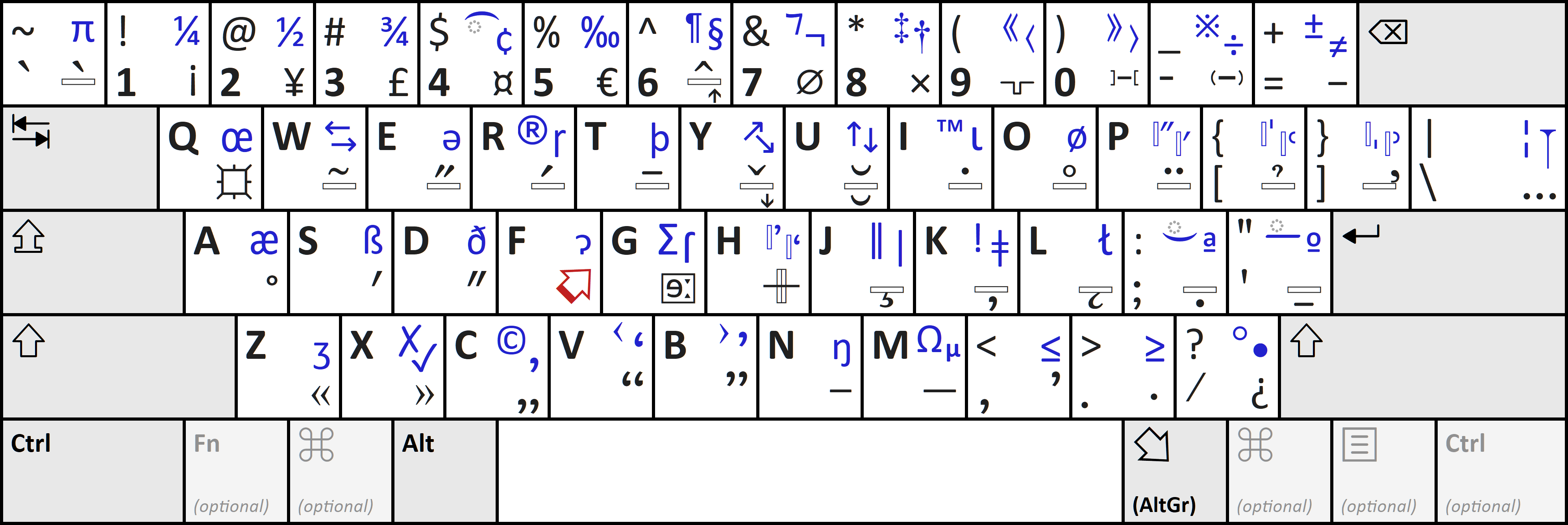

Keyboard layout "Latin International-A", using the common ISO key arrangement A ("ANSI")

The layout uses the AltGr key to enter the characters shown on the lower right of the keytops.

Besides the "Extra Selector" key to enter characters shown in the upper right corner of the keytops, it uses the following keys to enter a large number of characters not shown on the keytops, as specified in the separate standard ISO/IEC 9995-9:

- The "IPA Special Selector key" allows users to enter characters of the International Phonetic Alphabet in a systematic way.
- The "Superselect" key ("square sun") allows users to enter a large number of additional characters (acting like a compose key, with the exception that the result does not visually resemble a composition of the two following characters).

== Part 4: "Numeric section" ==
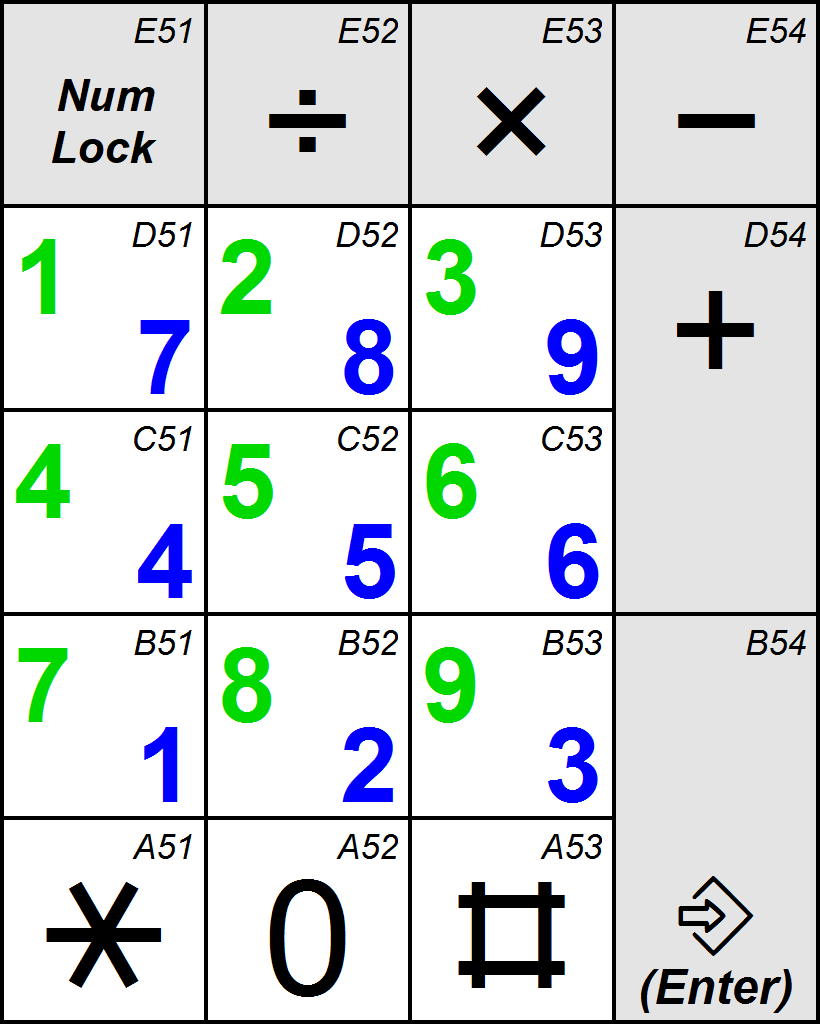
Numeric section of a keyboard according to ISO/IEC 9995-4, showing several details specified in this standard

ISO/IEC 9995-4:2025 specifies the layout of the numeric section of a keyboard, if such one exists. It is subdivided into the function zone (shown with grey background in the figure) and the numeric zone (shown with white background).

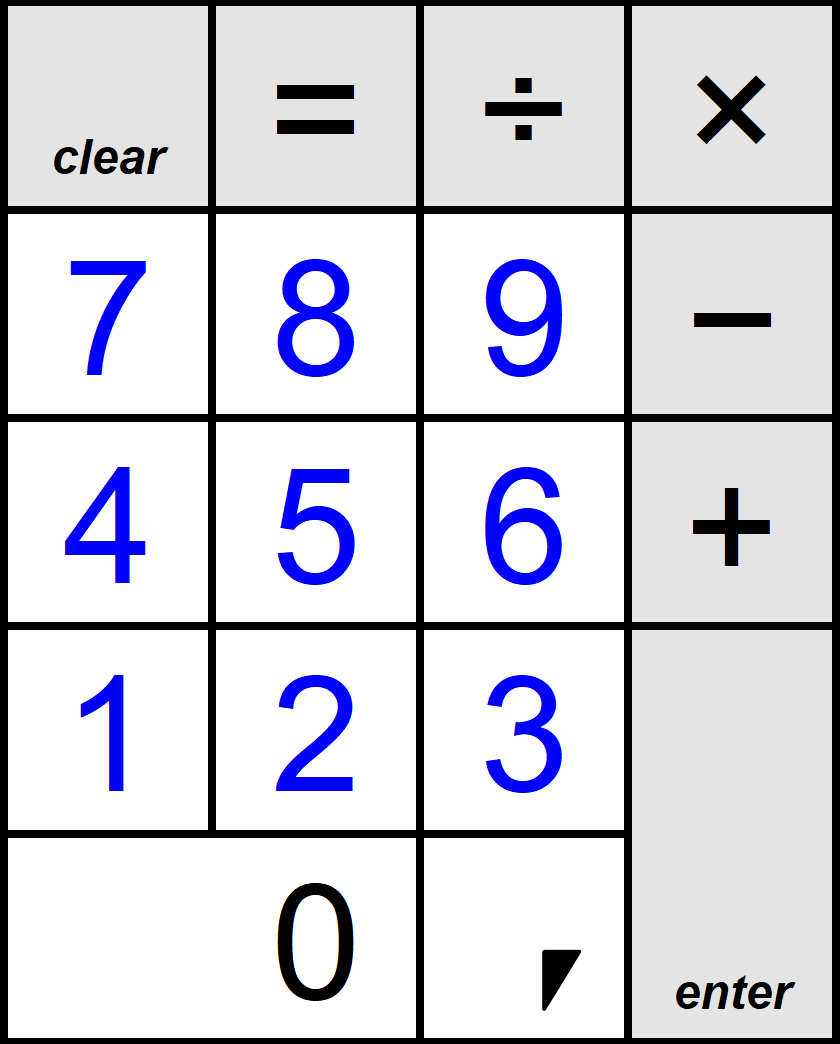
Variant compatible with Apple keyboards

The decimal digits 1...9 may be arranged in a "1-2-3 layout" (shown in green, named according to the keys in the D row), or in a "7-8-9 layout" (shown in blue).

On a keyboard used for telematic functions, the symbols ⚹ and ⌗ represent the initiator and the terminator. On a keyboard used for office purposes, the key denoted by ⌗ or ⎖ shall show the decimal separator (usually a dot or a comma, dependent on the user language). On such keyboards, the key position marked by the asterisk may be an extension of the 0 key, or a 00 (double-zero) key.

The keys in the function zone may be associated to the arithmetic function they denote, or to the arithmetic characters, dependent of the software which is used. The standard allows some variants regarding the arrangement of the specific arithmetic symbols.

== Part 5: "Editing and function section" ==
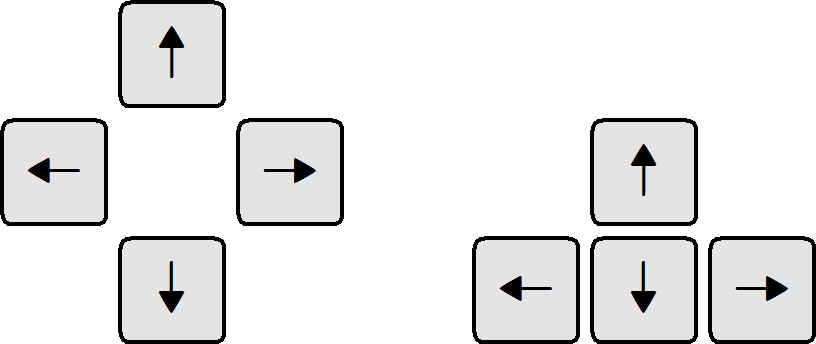
Cursor key arrangements

ISO/IEC 9995-5:2009 specifies the layout of the editing and function section of a keyboard. In fact, it specifies only two items:

- The Escape key has to be at the position K00 according to the reference grid specified in ISO/IEC 9995-1, or to the left of it (i. e., it has to be positioned near the left border of the first row above of the alphanumeric section).
- The four cursor keys (up, down, left, and right) in the cursor key zone (as specified in ISO/IEC 9995-1) have to be arranged in a "cross layout" or an "inverted T layout" (see figure). The recommended placement is such that the "cursor down" key is placed on row A (i. e., in the same row as the space bar).

== Part 7: "Symbols used to represent functions" ==
ISO/IEC 9995-7:2009 with its Amendment 1 (2012) specifies several keyboard symbols to be used on function keys more commonly labelled with text such as the Escape, Alt or Insert keys. Some of these symbols have been encoded as Unicode code points; the figure shown above in the ISO/IEC 9995-2 section shows several examples. The rest have been proposed for encoding, but (as of February 2026) have been postponed pending evidence of use in running text other than by ISO and DIN. They are used extensively e. g. in the Canadian multilingual keyboard.

== Part 8: "Allocation of letters to the keys of a numeric keypad" ==
ISO 9995-8 letter assignment

ISO/IEC 9995-8:2009 defines an assignment identical to E.161 of the 26 letters A–Z to the number keys of a numeric keypad, which then e.g may be used for text messaging. The space character is not assigned.

== Part 9: "Groups and mechanisms for multilingual and multiscript input" ==
ISO/IEC 9995-9:2026 "Groups and mechanisms for multilingual and multiscript input" describes, beside other aspects related to its subject:

- The "IPA Special Selector key", which allows to enter characters of the International Phonetic Alphabet in a systematic way.
  See Latin International keyboard layout #IPA for a comprehensive description.
- The "Superselect" key ("square sun"), which allows to enter a large number of additional characters.
  See Latin International keyboard layout #Superselect for a comprehensive description.

== Part 10: "Conventional symbols and methods to represent graphic characters not uniquely recognizable by their glyph on keyboards and in documentation" ==
ISO/IEC 9995-10:2025 specifies several symbols to enable the unique identification of characters on keytops which otherwise can easily be misidentified (as em vs. en dashes). Also, it specifies a way to present diacritical marks, especially on dead keys. There is a publicly available listing of these symbols in a proposal to encode them as Unicode characters (which has been postponed for lack of demonstrated use, as of February 2026).

== Part 11: "Functionality and labelling of dead keys" ==
ISO/IEC 9995-11:2026 describes the functionality and labelling of dead keys, which are used to apply diacritical marks on base letters (as e.g. an acute accent ´ applied on an e yields é). By the peculiar character mechanism (see below), other special characters can be entered.

=== Labelling ===
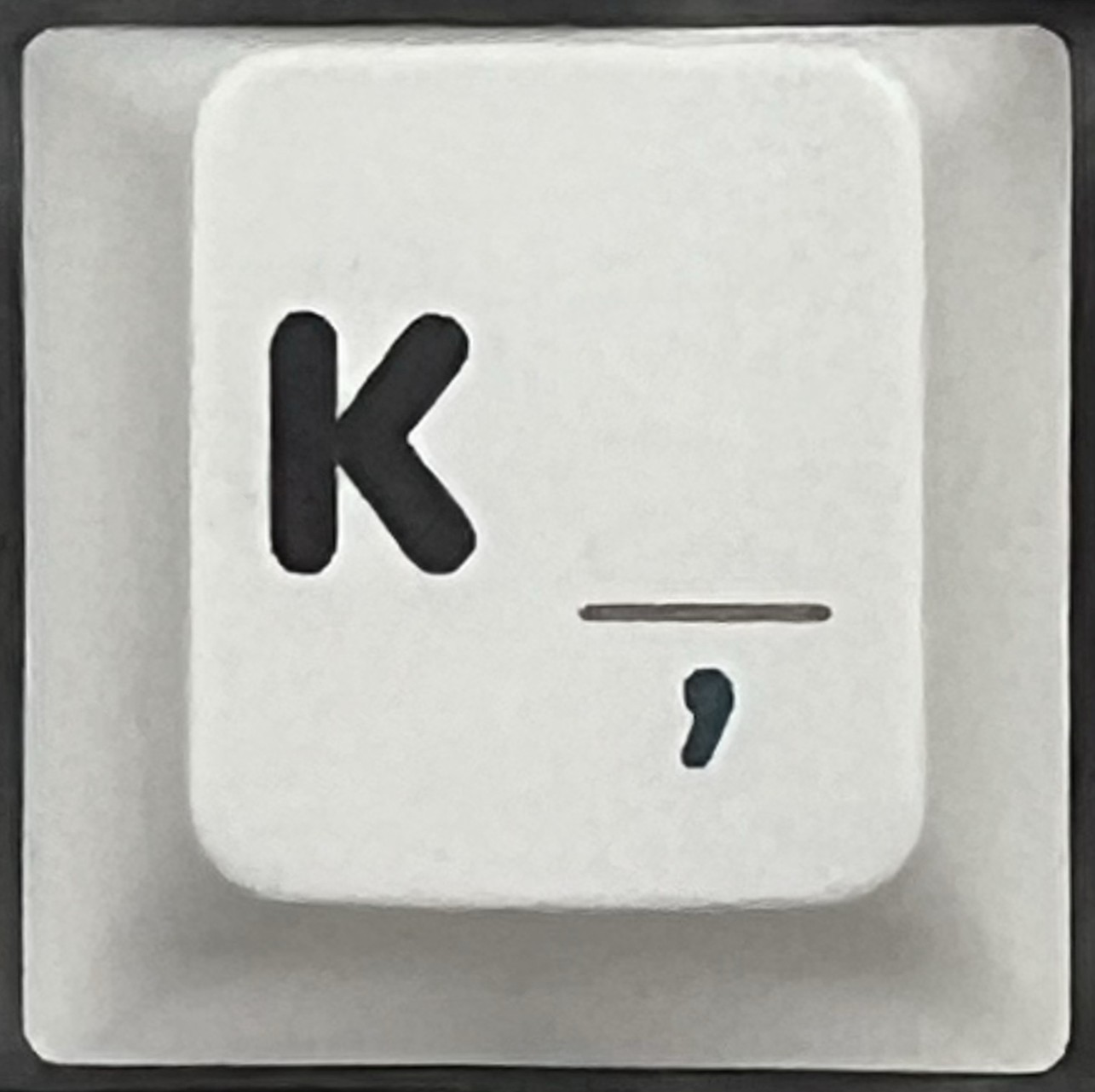
Key of the extended German E1 layout

Dead keys for diacritical marks are marked by narrow horizontal rectangles, which also indicate the position of the diacritical mark relative to the base letter.

The picture shows a key of the German extended keyboard layout, which allows to enter the comma below by AltGr+k, e.g. to yield the Romanian letters ș and ț. It shows the narrow horizontal rectangle with the comma underneath of it, thus indicating the shape and the position of the diacritical mark.

=== Functionality ===
First, the dead key is to be pressed and released, then the base letter. This only has to work for combinations for which individual code points are defined in Unicode (precomposed characters), as the Microsoft Windows keyboard driver model only allows this (as of February 2026). However, this covers the common use cases for widely used languages.

To be able to enter diacritical characters independently of this restriction, they also can be entered after the base character by actuating the dead key twice.

Examples:

- To enter the character Ç (capital C with cedilla), which is common and therefore available as a precombined character in Unicode, press, release them, and then press the ⇧+C keys.
- To enter the character X̱ (capital X with macron below), which is not common and not available as a precombined character in Unicode, press ⇧+X first, then twice.

Additionally, the standard specifies a mechanism that allows to enter all diacritics for all base letters as true dead key (i.e., before the base characters), which however requires special implementation in the operating system and is not implemented in common operating systems as of February 2026.

==== Dead keys on digits: Superscripting and subscripting ====
If the definition of a keyboard layout refers to this feature (which is optional), the circumflex applied on a digit (i.e., pressed and released before typing the digit) yields the superscript version of the digit (as indicated by the arrow in the keyboard symbol). Then, likewise, the caron yields the subscript version of the digit. Besides digits, the same applies for the parentheses ( and ), the plus sign + and the hyphen-minus -, the latter yielding a superscripted or subscripted minus sign.

==== Dead keys on space: Spacing variants of the diacritical marks ====
Applying a diacritical mark on the space yields a spacing variant of the mark (i.e., a character showing the mark on its own instead of being applied onto a letter) whenever such a character is contained in Unicode.
For instance, the input sequence – Space bar yields "¨".

For some diacritical marks for which no spacing variant is contained in Unicode, the standard specifies a spacing character similar to the diacritical mark, e.g.:

- – Space bar can yield "ˀ" (a superscript version of the glottal stop letter).
- – Space bar can yield "⸴" (a slightly elevated comma).
- – Space bar can yield "⸳" (a slightly elevated full stop).

==== The special dead key for the horizontal crossbar ====
The special dead key with its special keyboard symbol (defined in ISO/IEC 9995-7 as #87 "Horizontal stroke applicator") applies the horizontal crossbar onto letters. As any dead key, it is to be entered before the letter to which it applies. Especially, it is used to enter the following letters:

- Đ/đ used for Serbo-Croatian, Vietnamese and several other languages,
- Ħ/ħ for Maltese,
- Ŧ/ŧ for Sámi languages,
- Ʉ/ʉ for Comanche and other languages.

It is not to be used to enter Ł/ł (as used for Polish, Sorbian, Venetian, and several North American indigenous languages), as the bar is not horizontal. Also, it is not suited for Icelandic Eth (Ð/ð), since this is a different letter than the đ with horizontal bar (although the uppercase forms look identical).

==== Peculiar characters ====
The standard contains a list titled "Peculiar Characters which can be entered as combinations using diacritical marks". This list specifies combinations of a diacritical mark and a second key. E.g., the mathematical sign "≙" can be entered by a circumflex accent followed by a "=".

Optionally, the keyboard layout may specify that the generic currency symbol ¤ is used as a dead key to enter other currency symbols, as they are listed in ISO/IEC 9995-9:2026 as "group c".

== Part 12: "Keyboard group selection" ==
ISO/IEC 9995-12:2020 intends to provide a switching between different groups resembling different keyboard layouts especially for different scripts. This would be done by entering the "Superselect" key as defined in ISO/IEC 9995-9, followed by a digit or non-letter character instead of a letter which selects a group as specified in ISO/IEC 9995-9. Thus, the function somewhat resembles the "🌐︎" function on iOS on-screen keyboards, but provides more possibilities. As of February 2026, no implementations of the mechanisms specified in ISO/IEC 9995-12:2020 are known.

== Bibliography ==
- Neuville, Yves: Le clavier bureautique et informatique, Cedic/Nathan 1985, ISBN 2-7124-1705-4 (origin of the ISO/IEC 9995 standard)
