= Omani rial sign =

Currency symbol of the Omani rial

Omani rial sign
- In Unicode: U+20C4 ⃄ OMANI RIAL SIGN

Currency
- Currency: Omani rial

The Omani rial sign is the official currency symbol used for the Omani rial, the official currency of Oman. The design was presented to the public by the Central Bank of Oman on 19 November 2025. It consists stylized Arabic letters ʿayn (ع) in its initial form (عـ) and rāʾ (ر), crossed by two lines. The symbol should precede the value, e.g., 10, with an intervening space.

The symbol was accepted and encoded as U+20C4, in Unicode version 18.0, which was released in September 2026.

Oman is the third Arab country to issue a symbol for their currency after Saudi Arabia and the United Arab Emirates.

== Design ==
The Omani rial symbol.

According to the Central Bank of Oman, "the symbol’s design is based on principles of simplicity, clarity, and ease of use in both handwritten and digital contexts. It reflects Oman’s cultural and linguistic identity, is clearly distinguishable from other currency symbols, and conveys stability and strength through its structured, geometric form".

The bank says that the design draws inspiration from Oman’s historical connection to the Arabic language and the tradition of Arabic calligraphy. It was developed by simplifying key elements and linking them to the linguistic and visual identity of the Sultanate, and is built on three main foundations: the use of straight, structured lines to signify stability and strength; the incorporation of the Arabic letter ʿayn (ع), the first letter of Omani (عماني), reflecting national affiliation; and the Arabic letter rāʾ (ر),the first letter of rial (ريال), which directly identifies the currency.

The official symbol of the Omani rial was announced on 19 November 2025 by the Central Bank of Oman, following approval by Sultan Haitham bin Tariq. The Central Bank stated that the introduction of a unified currency symbol is intended to support the rial's consistent representation across financial, commercial, and digital platforms, facilitate international transactions, and increase its recognisability. The launch was also linked to wider financial modernisation efforts under Oman Vision 2040 and to Oman's historical role in regional and international trade.

== Usage & implementation ==
The Omani rial sign was accepted and encoded as U+20C4, in Unicode version 18.0, which was released in September 2026.
