= Secondary stress =

Degree of phonological stress

ˌ◌
- IPA number: 502

Encoding
- Entity (decimal): &#716;
- Unicode (hex): U+02CC

Secondary stress (or obsolete: secondary accent) is the weaker of two degrees of stress in the pronunciation of a word, the stronger degree of stress being called primary. The International Phonetic Alphabet symbol for secondary stress is a short vertical line preceding and at the foot of the secondarily stressed syllable: /prəˌnʌnsiˈeɪʃən/ (the higher vertical line denotes primary stress). Another tradition in English is to assign acute and grave accents for primary and secondary stress, respectively: pronùnciátion.

== Occurrence ==
Most languages have at most one degree of stress on the phonemic level. That is, each syllable has stress or it does not. (At a phonetic level, English has been analyzed as having up to four levels of stress, that is, three degrees of stressed and one unstressed.) Many languages have rhythmic stress; location of the stress may not be predictable, but when the location of one stressed syllable (which may be the primary stress) is known, certain syllables before or after can be predicted to also be stressed; these may have secondary stress. An example is Dutch, where the rule is that initial and final syllables (word boundaries) take secondary stress, then every alternate syllable before and after the primary stress, as long as two stressed syllables are not adjacent and stress does not fall on /ə/ (there are, however, some exceptions to this rule). See Dutch phonology § Stress. A similar rule applies in Romanian: secondary stress falls on every alternate syllable, starting with the first, as long as it does not fall adjacent to the primary stress. In other languages (including Standard Arabic, Bhojpuri, Cayuga, Estonian, Hawaiian, Kaure, Malayalam, and Warrgamay), secondary stress can be predicted to fall on heavy syllables.

In other languages, the placement of secondary stress is not predictable, or may not be predictable (and thus be phonemic) for some words. This is frequently posited for Germanic languages, including English. For example, secondary stress is said to arise in compound words like vacuum cleaner, where the first syllable of vacuum has primary stress, while the first syllable of cleaner is usually said to have secondary stress. However, this analysis is problematic; Bolinger (1986) notes that these may be cases of full vs reduced unstressed vowels being interpreted as secondary stress vs unstressed. See Stress and vowel reduction in English for details.

In Norwegian, the pitch accent is lost from one of the roots in a compound word, but the erstwhile tonic syllable retains the full length (long vowel or geminate consonant) of a stressed syllable; this has sometimes been characterized as secondary stress.

== See also ==
- Pausa

== Bibliography ==
- Bolinger, Dwight (1986). Intonation and Its Parts: Melody in Spoken English. Stanford University Press. ISBN 0-8047-1241-7.
