= Turned m =

Letter of the Zhuang alphabet

Turned M
- Ɯ ɯ

Usage
- Type: alphabetic
- Language of origin: International Phonetic Alphabet, Yakut language, Tsakhur, Standard Zhuang, Dan language, Chami language
- Sound values: [ɯ]; [ɨˤ]
- In Unicode: U+019C, U+026F

Ɯ (minuscule: ɯ; also, minuscule ɯ) is a letter that was used in the Zhuang alphabet from 1957 to 1986 to represent a close back unrounded vowel /ɯ/. At some time in or before 1986, it was replaced with W. It was also used in Semyon Novgorodov's Yakut alphabet.

In the International Phonetic Alphabet, it is used to represent the same vowel.

In some fonts, it is homoglyphic with the Cyrillic letter Sha, and in this manner it was used in the Tsakhur language, representing the pharyngealized close central unrounded vowel /ɨˤ/. It is represented today by the digraph ⟨ЫI⟩.

In the FUT, it represents a close central rounded vowel.

== Usage on computers ==
Character information
Preview	Ɯ		ɯ	
Unicode name	LATIN CAPITAL LETTER TURNED M		LATIN SMALL LETTER TURNED M	
Encodings	decimal	hex	dec	hex
Unicode	412	U+019C	623	U+026F
UTF-8	198 156	C6 9C	201 175	C9 AF
Numeric character reference	&#412;	&#x19C;	&#623;	&#x26F;
