= Stretched C =

ʗ is a letter of the Latin alphabet used to represent an alveolar click consonant. This sound has been labeled as alveolar, postalveolar, retroflex and palatal in different eras.

ʗ was part of the International Phonetic Alphabet (where its designation was "postalveolar") until 1989, when it was replaced by [ǃ].

== See also ==
- Click letter
