= Old Norse orthography =

Systems for transcribing the Old Norse language

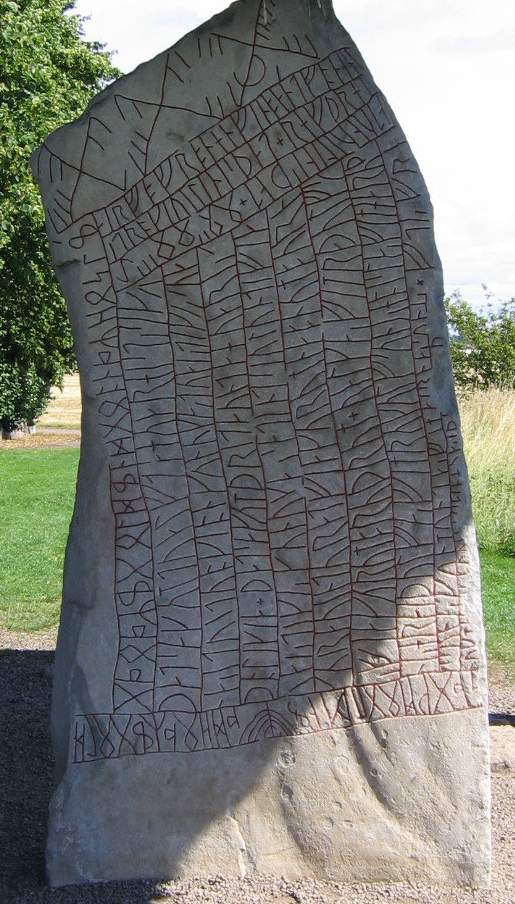
Old Norse inscription on the Rök runestone

The orthography of the Old Norse language was diverse, being written in both Runic and Latin alphabets, with many spelling conventions, variant letterforms, and unique letters and signs. In modern times, scholars established a standardized spelling for the language. When Old Norse names are used in texts in other languages, modifications to this spelling are often made. In particular, the names of Old Norse mythological figures often have several different spellings.

The first appearance of an ancestral stage of Old Norse in a written runic form dates back to c. AD 200–300 (with the Øvre Stabu spearhead traditionally dated to the late 2nd century), at this time still showing an archaic language form (similar to reconstructed Proto-Germanic) termed Proto-Norse. Old Norse proper appears by c. AD 800. While there are remains of Viking runestones from the Viking Age, today they are rare, and vary in the use of orthography depending on when they were created. Rune stones created near the end of the Viking Age tend to have a greater influence from Old English runes.

An understanding of the writing system of Old Norse is crucial for fully understanding the Old Norse language. Studies of remaining rune stones from the Viking Age reveal many nuances about the spoken language, such as the constant use of alliteration. A comparison of various whetstones from this time period with the works of Snorri Sturluson reveals that alliteration was common in many Old Norse writings, and were not only present in skaldic works. This would then suggest that the Vikings closely tied their language to their auditory sense, which in turn would have helped with the continual transfer of their cultural memory, which was also closely tied to their language.

== Latin alphabet orthography ==
The following table gives various attested spellings of sounds and their IPA transcription. In general usage, an orthographic distinction of phones or phonemes is not necessarily held by every writer. For example, an author may only distinguish some vowels by length, and orthographic devices could be mixed and matched. Where the table lists a long-or-short phoneme /(ː)/, a specifically short // or long /ː/ phoneme represents additional spellings not covered by length marking rules. Likewise, a phonetic entry only lists spellings not used by the equivalent phoneme(s). N/A is used when no specific spelling is used, e.g. where all long vowel spellings are found using the rules for deriving long vowel spellings from the short vowel, or no general spelling is used, e.g. when short and long vowels are always spelled differently.

Latin orthography of Old Norse vowels
Phoneme	/i(ː)/	/i/^{U}	/e(ː)/	/æ(ː)/	/æ/	/æː/	/y(ː)/	/ø(ː)/	/ø/	/øː/
General usage	i	i, e, æ	e, æ	æ, ę	e	—N/a	y	ø, ö, œ	—N/a	
Standard normalization	i		e	—N/a	ę	æ	y	—N/a	ø	œ
Phoneme	/u(ː)/	/u/^{U}	/o(ː)/	/ɑ(ː)/	/ɑ/^{U}	/ɒ/	/æi/	/ɒu/	/øy/	/Vː/
General usage	u	u, o	o	a	a, æ	ǫ, o, a^{E}	ei, ęi, æi	au	ey, øy	V, V́, VV
Standard normalization	u		o	a		ǫ	ei	au	ey	V́
Latin orthography of Old Norse consonants
Phoneme	/p(ː)/	/b(ː)/	/m(ː)/	/f/	[v]	/θ/	[ð]	/t(ː)/	/d(ː)/	/n(ː)/
General usage	p	b	m	f	ff, u,^{?} ffu	þ, th	ð, dh, d	t	d	n
Standard normalization	p	b	m	f	f	þ	ð	t	d	n
Phoneme	/l(ː)/	/lː/	/s(ː)/	/r(ː)/	/ɽ(ː)/	/j/	/w/	/k(ː)/	/ɡ(ː)/	[ɣ]
General usage	l	ꝇ	s	r	r	i, j	u, v, ƿ, ꝩ	k, c	g	gh
Standard normalization	l	—N/a	s	r		j	v	k	g	g
Phoneme	/h/	/hw, hr, hl, hn/		[ts]	[t, d, ð, n]+[s]		[ks]	[ɡs]	[kw]	/Cː/
General usage	h	h(S)		z			x	gx^{E}	qu, qv, kv	CC, C
Standard normalization	h	h(S)		z	—N/a		x	—N/a	—N/a	CC

Legend:

- ^{U}: Unstressed
- ^{E}: Chiefly eastern
- (ː): Long or short. See /Vː/ and /Cː/ columns for length and gemination marking.
- ^{?}:

The low/low-mid vowels may be indicated differently:

- /æ/ = /ɛ/
- /ɒ/ = /ɔ/
- /ɑ/ = /a/

Dialect-specific sounds:

- /ɒː/: Icelandic; a, aa, á, o, ó, ǫ́; Normalized: á
- /ə/: Danish; e, æ

When dialectal mergers such as OEN monophthongization took place, regional spelling often changed to reflect this. Sometimes, both phonemes' spellings would be used, but confused.

The epenthetic vowel had different regional spellings. In East Norse it was commonly spelled as ⟨e⟩ or ⟨a⟩, while in West Norse it was often spelled ⟨u⟩, just like in Iceland.

=== Manuscript spelling ===
The original Icelandic manuscripts, which are the main source of knowledge of Norse mythology, did not employ a unified system of spelling. During the Viking Age, many dialects of Old Norse were spoken. While they appear to have been mutually intelligible, the slight variances resulted in various spellings. Thus the same name might be spelled several different ways even in the original manuscripts. Letters unique to the language existed, such as a modified version of the letter Wynn called Vend that was used briefly for the sounds /u/, /v/, and /w/. In particular, the length of vowels was only sporadically marked in many manuscripts and various umlauted vowels were often not distinguished from others. Another complication is that several shortcut forms for common words, syllables, and grammatical endings developed. One example is the use of the rune named maðr (man) for the word maðr. Another is the use of a special glyph for the various r-endings so common in Old Norse. These scribal abbreviations are categorized as follows:

- Suspension, truncation, or curtailment: Certain letters of the word are omitted, with the abbreviation indicated by a superscript stroke (esp. dropping a nasal), dot(s) beside the letter, or occasionally a colon. Examples: Ꝥ for þat (etc.), ū for um, hō for hón, þan̅ for þann; .kgr. for konungr, .s. for sonr.
- Contraction: The first and last letters are written, and the abbreviation is indicated by a dot or superscript stroke.
- Special signs or brevigraphs: Symbols replacing words or syllables. Examples: Tironian et (⁊) for ok, ᛘ for maðr, syllabic et (Ꝫꝫ) in mꝫ (með) for /eð/.
- Superscript letters: Regular letters contained in the word or letters specifically for abbreviation purposes. Often with syllabic content. Examples: sᵏ (sik), a zig-zag shaped symbol mainly for er and ir in u͛a (vera).

These abbreviation conventions and a majority of the signs are inherited from the Latin language itself, and were common to the Latin alphabet in other languages. However, other signs or conventions are specifically Norse, such as the er zig-zag.

=== Normalized spelling ===
"Normalized spelling" can be used to refer to normalization in general or the standard normalization in particular. With normalized spelling, the manuscript spelling is altered to adhere to be more strict and regular. These respellings are designed to be phonemically precise rather than representative of the manuscripts. The degree of normalization may vary, but in general the text is at the end reduced to limited deviation from a regularized system, perhaps at the expense of some dialectal character.

For various reasons 19th century scholars came up with a standardized normalization of Old Norse which remains in use. It is primarily based on the so-called First Grammatical Treatise. Vowel length is marked and umlauted vowels are unambiguously represented. The standardized spelling employs a few characters that were not available in early electronic character sets, so replacements were often used. The most consequential was the use of ö instead of ǫ; the latter being present in Unicode v1.0 (1991) as U+01EA.

== Runic orthography and transcription ==
The following table associates the phonemes of the language to its orthographic representations. Vowel nasalization and length are not distinguished in the table when distinguished in neither orthography, nor is /æi/ distinguished from /æ/+/i/.

Runic orthography of Old Norse vowels
Phoneme	/i(ː)/	/eː/	/i/^{U}, /e/	/æ(ː)/	/y(ː)/	/ø(ː)/	/u(ː)/	/u/^{U}	/o(ː)/	/ɑ(ː)/	/ɒ(ː)/	/ɑ̃(ː)/	/ɒu/, /ɐy/
Younger Futhark, 8th–12th c.	ᛁ			ᛆ/ᛅ, ᚬ/ᚭ	ᚢ				ᚢ, ᚬ/ᚭ	ᛆ/ᛅ	ᛆ/ᛅ, ᛅᚢ/ᛆᚢ, ᚬ/ᚭ	ᚬ/ᚭ	ᛅᚢ/ᛆᚢ
Medieval Runes, 11th–14th c.	ᛁ	ᛂ	ᛅ		ᚤ, ᛦ	ᚯ	ᚢ	ᚮ		ᛆ			ᛆᚢ
Runic orthography of Old Norse consonants
Phoneme	/p/	/b/	/f/	[v]	/t/	/d/	/θ/	[ð]	/s/	[ts]	/k/	/ɡ/	/h/
Younger Futhark, 8th–12th c.	ᛒ		ᚠ	ᚢ	ᛏ		ᚦ		ᛋ		ᚴ		ᚼ
Medieval Runes, 11th–14th c.	ᛔ	ᛒ	ᚠ	ᚡ	ᛐ	ᛑ	ᚦ	ᚧ	ᛌ		ᚴ	ᚵ	ᚼ
Phoneme	/m/	/n/	/ɾ/ (?)	/ɽ/ (?)	/l/	/j/	/w/	/Cː/					
Younger Futhark, 8th–12th c.	ᛘ	ᚾ	ᚱ	ᛦ	ᛚ	ᛁ	ᚢ	—N/a					
Medieval Runes, 11th–14th c.	ᛘ	ᚿ	ᚱ	ᛧ	ᛚ	ᛁ	ᚢ	C, CC					

- ^{U}: Unstressed

=== Transcription of Danish and Swedish runestones ===
When transcribing Old Norse texts from Danish and Swedish runestones, many scholars, but not all, use an orthography that is adapted to represent Old East Norse, the dialect of Old Norse in Denmark and Sweden. The main differences are the diphthong æi instead of ei as in stæinn ("stone") and i instead of the glide j as in giald ("payment"). In this standard, the u-umlauted a represented by ǫ is not usually considered, but rendered as the underlying a, as in the name Anundʀ. Another difference is the representation of the phoneme ʀ, instead of simply r as in West Norse, where the ʀ phoneme merged with r earlier. However, even if they render the transcription according to the local pronunciation, the Rundata project presents personal names according to the previously mentioned standardized spelling in English translations. Here follows an example from the Orkesta Runestone (U 344):

Standardized spelling:

En Ulfr hefir á Englandi þrjú gjǫld tekit. Þat var fyrsta þat's Tosti ga[l]t. Þá [galt] Þorketill. Þá galt Knútr.

The rendering of Old East Norse:

En Ulfʀ hafiʀ a Ænglandi þry giald takit. Þet was fyrsta þet's Tosti ga[l]t. Þa [galt] Þorkætill. Þa galt Knutʀ.

But when translating into English, the standardized spelling is used:

But Ulfr has taken three payments in England. That was the first that Tosti paid. Then Þorketill paid. Then Knútr paid.

== Modernized Icelandic spelling ==
In many modern Icelandic publications of Old Norse works, the modern Icelandic spelling is used. The orthography is essentially the same (since it was intentionally modelled after the aforementioned normalized Old Norse in the 19th century), but changes from Old Norse phonology to Icelandic phonology are incorporated in the translation that may not have been in the source text. One such difference is the insertion of u before r, when it is preceded by a consonant at the end of the word. Thus the Old Norse name Baldr comes out as Baldur in modern Icelandic. Other differences include vowel-shifts, whereby Old Norse ǫ became Icelandic ö, and Old Norse œ (oe ligature) became Icelandic æ (ae ligature). Old Norse ø corresponds in modern Icelandic to ö, as in sökkva, or to e, as in gera. There is also consonant lenition of final k and t to g and ð, e.g. mig for earlier mik and það for earlier þat. These distinct features are summarized in the table below:

ON	Icelandic
-r	-ur
-k	-g
-t	-ð
ę	e
ǫ	ö
ǫ́	á
œ, ǿ	æ
ø	ö, e
kø	kjö, ke
gø	gjö, ge

== Anglicized spelling ==
For the convenience of English writers and readers the Old Norse characters not used in English are commonly replaced with English ones. This can lead to ambiguity and confusion. Diacritics may be removed (á → a, ö → o). The following character conversions also take place:

- ø → o
- œ → o, oe
- æ → ae
- þ → th
- ð → th, d, dh

Another common convention in English is to drop consonant nominative endings:

- Egill → Egil
- Yggdrasill → Yggdrasil
- Gunnarr → Gunnar
- Sveinn → Svein
- Freyr → Frey
- Hildr → Hild

Sometimes a j is dropped after ey.

- Freyja → Freya

Other quirks sometimes seen include adding a Latin -a suffix to the names of goddesses.

- Frigg → Frigga
- Iðunn → Iduna

Obviously the various permutations allow for many possible spellings for a given name.

Some authors, for example, replace þ with th and ð with th, dh or d but keep the accents; others may not replace ǫ with ö but prefer o.

Thus, in addition to the various versions below, the name of Hǫðr could come out as:

- Hod, Hoðr, Hödhr, Hödr, Höd, Höð, Hoð, etcetera

== List of names ==
A list of some commonly encountered Old Norse names with variant spellings. * marks anglicizations.

=== Gods (Æsir) ===
- Ása-Þórr, Asa-Thor*
- Bragi, Brage
- Baldr, Balder, Baldur. See Old Norse epenthetic vowel.
- Hǫðr, Hoth,* Hod,* Hothr,* Hodr, Hoder, Hodhr*
- Forseti, Forsete
- Heimdallr, Heimdalr, Heimdall,* Heimdal*
- Hœnir, Honir, Hoenir*
- Óðinn, Odin, Odhin,* Othin,* Odinn
- Ǫku-Þórr, Oku-Thor*
- Þórr, Thor,* Thorr* Tor
- Týr, Tyr, Ty*
- Vili, Vilji, Vile
- Vé, Ve
- Magni
- Modi
- Frey
- Freya
- Njord

==== Goddesses ====
- Frigg, Frigga
- Hlín, Hlin
- Iðunn, Idun,* Idunn, Iduna

=== Jotuns (commonly mistranslated as Giants) ===
- Ægir, Aegir*
- Býleistr, Byleist
- Loki, Loke
- Bölþorn, Bolthorn

==== Jotunnesses ====
- Hel, Hela
- Gerðr, Gerd, Gerth,* Gerthr*
- Rindr, Rind
- Angrboða, Angrboda
- Skaði, Skadi

=== Animals ===
- Freki, Freke
- Geri, Gere
- Huginn, Hugin*
- Jǫrmungandr, Jormungand, Iormungand
- Miðgarðsormr, Midgardsorm
- Muninn, Munin*
- Ratatoskr, Ratatusk, Ratatosk
- Garmr
- Fenrir
- Níðhöggr, Nidhogg

=== Places ===
- Ásgarðr, Asgard*
- Miðgarðr, Midgard*
- Niflheimr, Niflheim
- Útgarðr, Utgard*

=== Other ===
- Æsir, Aesir*
- Hávamál, Havamal
- Ragnarǫk, Ragnarok
- Vǫluspá, Völuspá, Voluspa
- Yggdrasill, Yggdrasil*

== See also ==
- First Grammatical Treatise
- List of runestones
- Runic transliteration and transcription
