= English terms with diacritical marks =

öo

Letter o with diaeresis

English rarely uses diacritics, which are symbols indicating the modification of a letter's sound when spoken. Most of the affected words are in terms imported from other languages. Certain diacritics are often called accents. The only diacritic native to Modern English is the two dots (representing a vowel hiatus): its usage has tended to fall off except in certain publications and particular cases. (Note: The grave accent and the acute accent are sometimes seen on loan words from other languages but these tend not to persist. The grave accent is sometimes used to indicate non-standard stresses in poetry.)

Proper nouns are not generally counted as English terms except when accepted into the language as an eponym – such as Geiger–Müller tube.

Unlike continental European languages, English orthography tends to use digraphs (like "sh", "oo", and "ea") rather than diacritics to indicate more sounds than can be accommodated by the letters of the Latin alphabet. Unlike other systems with transparent phonemic orthographies (such as Spanish orthography) where the spelling indicates the pronunciation, English spelling is highly varied, and diacritics alone would be insufficient to make it reliably phonetic. (See English orthography § History.)

== Types of diacritical marks ==
Though limited, the following diacritical marks in English may be encountered, particularly for marking in poetry:

- the acute accent (née) and grave accent (English poetry marking, changèd), modifying vowels or marking stresses
- the circumflex (entrepôt), borrowed from French
- the diaeresis (Zoë), indicating a second syllable in two consecutive vowels
- the macron (English poetry marking, lēad pronounced /liːd/, not /lɛd/), lengthening vowels, as in te reo Māori; or indicating omitted n or m (in pre-Modern English, both in print and in handwriting).
- the breve (English poetry marking, drŏll pronounced /drɒl/, not /droʊl/), shortening vowels
- the umlaut (über), altering Germanic vowels
- the cedilla (soupçon, façade), in French, Portuguese and Catalan it is a softening c, indicating 's-' not 'k-' pronunciation
- the tilde (Señor, João), in Spanish indicating palatalised n, and Portuguese indicating nasal a and o (although in Spanish and most source languages, the tilde is not considered a diacritic over the letter n but rather as an integral part of the distinct letter ñ; in Portuguese the sound is represented by "nh")

Less common diacritics are occasionally found in English-language publications to preserve the native rendering of names of people, places, and culturally significant items such as food. For example, the caron in Karel Čapek; the ring in Åland; or phở with the Vietnamese letter Ơ (O with horn) with hook above.

=== Special characters ===
Some sources distinguish "diacritical marks" (marks upon standard letters in the A–Z 26-letter alphabet) from "special characters" (letters not marked but radically modified from the standard 26-letter alphabet) such as Old English and Icelandic eth (Ð, ð) and thorn (uppercase Þ, lowercase þ), and ligatures such as Latin and Anglo-Saxon Æ (minuscule: æ), and German eszett (ß; final -ß, often -ss even in German and always in Swiss Standard German).

The reverse of "special characters" is when foreign digraphs, such as Welsh ll in Llanelli, Dutch ij, or Croatian nj (same in Serbian and Bosnian) are simply treated as two standard A–Z characters.

== Native English words ==
In some cases, the diacritic is not borrowed from any foreign language but is purely of English origin. The second of two vowels in a hiatus can be marked with a diaeresis (or "tréma") – as in words such as coöperative, daïs and reëlect – but its use has become less common, sometimes being replaced by the use of a hyphen. The New Yorker and MIT Technology Review under Jason Pontin have maintained such usage as house styles.

The diaeresis mark is also in rare cases used over a single vowel to show that it is pronounced separately (as in Brontë).

The acute and grave accents are occasionally used in poetry and lyrics: the acute to indicate stress overtly where it might be ambiguous (rébel vs. rebél) or nonstandard for metrical reasons (caléndar); the grave to indicate that an ordinarily silent or elided syllable is pronounced (warnèd, parlìament).

=== In historical versions of English ===
The Old English Latin alphabet began to replace the Runic alphabet in the 8th century, due to the influence of Celtic Christian missionaries to the Anglo-Saxon kingdoms. Orthography of Old English – which was entirely handwritten in its own time – was not well standardized, though it did not use all the Latin letters, and included several letters not present in the modern alphabet. When reprinted in modern times, an overdot is occasionally used with two Latin letters to differentiate sounds for the reader:

- ċ is used for a voiceless palato-alveolar affricate /t͡ʃ/
- ġ for a palatal approximant /j/ (probably a voiced palatal fricative /ʝ/ in the earliest texts)

Some modern printings also apply diacritics to vowels following the rules of Old Norse normalized spelling developed in the 19th century.

In the Late Middle English period, the shape of the English letter þ (thorn), which was derived from the Runic alphabet, evolved in some handwritten and blackletter texts to resemble the Latin letter y. The þ shape survived into the era of printing presses only as far as the press of William Caxton. In later publications, thorn was represented by "y", or by ẏ to distinguish thorn from y. By the end of the Early Modern English period, thorn had been completely replaced in contemporary usage by the digraph "th" (reviving a practice from early Old English), and the overdot was no longer needed outside of printings of very old texts. The overdot is missing from the only surviving usage of a Y-shaped thorn, in the archaic stock phrase ye olde (from "þe olde", pronounced "the old", but "ye olde" is often misread and pronounced with the modern "y" sound).

== Words imported from other languages ==
Loanwords, or sometimes more precisely called borrowed words, have entered the English language from foreign languages by a process of naturalisation, or specifically anglicisation, which is carried out mostly unconsciously (a similar process occurs in all other languages). During this process, there is a tendency to adapt the original word: this includes accents and other diacritics being dropped (for example French hôtel and French rôle becoming "hotel" and "role" respectively in English, or French à propos, which lost both the accent and space to become English "apropos").

In many cases, imported words can be found in print in both their accented and unaccented versions. Since modern dictionaries are mostly descriptive and no longer prescribe outdated forms, they increasingly list unaccented forms, though some dictionaries, such as the Oxford English Dictionary, do not list the unaccented variants of particular words (e.g., soupçon).

Words that retain their accents often do so to help indicate pronunciation (e.g. frappé, naïve, soufflé), or to help distinguish them from an unaccented English word (e.g. exposé vs. expose, résumé vs. resume, rosé vs. rose). Technical terms or those associated with specific fields (especially cooking or musical terms) are less likely to lose their accents (such as the French crème brûlée, étude, façade).

Some Spanish words with the Spanish letter ñ have been naturalised by substituting English ny (e.g., Spanish cañón is now usually English canyon, Spanish piñón is now usually English pinyon pine). Certain words, like piñata, jalapeño and quinceañera, are usually kept intact. In many instances the ñ is replaced with the plain letter n. In words of German origin (e.g. doppelgänger), the letters with umlauts ä, ö, ü may be written ae, oe, ue. This could be seen in many newspapers during World War II, which printed Fuehrer for Führer. However, today umlauts are usually either left out, with no e following the previous letter, or included as written in German (as in The New York Times or The Economist). Zurich is an exception since it is not a case of a "dropped umlaut", but is a genuine English exonym, used also in French (from Latin Turicum)—therefore it may be seen written without the umlaut even alongside other German and Swiss names that retain the umlaut. The German letter ß is usually replaced in English by ‘ss’. This is seen in names such as Pascal Groß.

=== Accent-addition and accent-removal ===
As words are naturalized into English, sometimes diacritics are added to imported words that originally did not have any, often to distinguish them from common English words or to otherwise assist in proper pronunciation. In the cases of maté from Spanish mate (/ˈmɑːteɪ/; Spanish: ['mate]), animé from Japanese anime, and latté or even lattè from Italian latte (/ˈlɑːteɪ/; Italian pronunciation: [ˈlatte]), an accent on the final e indicates that the word is pronounced with /eɪ/ at the end, rather than the e being silent. Examples of a partial removal include resumé (from the French résumé) and haček (from the Czech háček) because of the change in pronunciation of the initial vowels. Complete naturalization stripping all diacritics also has occurred, in words such as canyon, from the Spanish cañón. For accurate readings, some speech writers use diacritics to differentiate homographs, such as lēad (verb meaning "to guide", pronounced /liːd/) and lĕad (noun, as in the elemental metal, pronounced /lɛd/).

In reverent and slightly poetic usage are commonly two -ed suffixed adjectives, if prefixed by a superlative, “learnèd” whereas rarely so “belovèd”. These are pronounced with two and three syllables respectively, unlike their related past participle versions. In courts, “my learnèd friend” is for any other specific representative at the bar, “the learnèd judge” for any cited judge and “this/the learnèd professor” or any other contributor’s title for anyone else cited who is legally highly qualified. Many wedding ceremonies begin “Dearly belovèd”, whether correctly spelt this way or not. This list expands to almost all -ed words in hymns and old rhymes if by chance helping with rhythm, emphasis or musical cadence. The, to some clerics, mildly blasphemous, quiet, polite curse “the blessèd (object)” still features in most British dialects, it being more reserved to main liturgy as "the blessèd Virgin Mary", "our blessèd saviour" and "blessèd are the poor in spirit" etc.

== Regional differences ==
=== Canada ===
In Canadian English, words of French origin retain their orthography more often than in other English-speaking countries, such as the usage of é (e with acute) in café, Montréal, née, Québec, and résumé. This is due to the large influence afforded by French being one of Canada's two official languages at the federal government level as well as at the provincial level in New Brunswick and Manitoba, and the majority and sole official language in Québec.

=== New Zealand ===
In New Zealand from the early 21st century, loan words in English that were assimilated from Māori language antecedents, have increasingly been replaced by the original Māori words, with their corresponding macrons (which indicate vowel length). This practice was adopted by the main newspaper chains in May 2018 to show respect for the official status of Maori. This shift primarily reflects changing social attitudes as part of the ongoing Māori Renaissance, and is sometimes followed in English usage outside New Zealand when writing about New Zealand topics. In some areas, such as the Waikato, use of a macron is replaced by a double vowel instead (eg. waahine instead of wāhine), typically in areas where local Māori dialects prefer usage of a double vowel. A diaeresis has sometimes been used (wähine) in place of a macron where the technical capacity to apply a macron diacritic is limited.

== Regional dialects ==
Diacritics have been employed in the orthographies of some regional dialects in England.

- Grave accents and macrons are used in some orthographies of Cumbrian in words such as steàn "stone", seùner "sooner" and pūnd "pound".
- Diaereses are used in the Lincolnshire dialect, for example stoän "stone", goä "go" and maäke "make".
- Grave accents, circumflexes and diaereses are used in the Dorset dialect, in words such as mornèn "morning", drîth "dryness" or "drought" and ceäkes "cakes".

== Names with diacritics ==
Diacritics are used in the names of some English-speaking people:

- British: Charlotte Brontë, Emily Brontë (and other members of the Brontë family), Noël Coward, Zoë Wanamaker, Emeli Sandé, John le Carré
- American: Beyoncé Knowles, Chloë Grace Moretz, Chloë Sevigny, Renée Fleming, Renée Zellweger, Zoë Baird, Zoë Kravitz, Donté Stallworth, John C. Frémont, Robert M. Gagné, Roxanne Shanté, Janelle Monáe, Jhené Aiko, Louise Glück, Renée Good
- Australian: Renée Geyer, Zoë Badwi

== Typographical limitations ==
The early days of metal type printing quickly faced problems of not just simple diacritical marks for English, and accents for French and German, but also musical notation (for sheet music printing) and Greek and Hebrew alphabets (for Bible printing). However problems with representation of diacritical marks continued even in scholarly publishing and dissertations up to the word processor era. Mechanical typewriter keyboards manufactured for English-speaking countries seldom include diacritics.

The first generation of word processors also had character set limitations, and confusion due to typesetting convention was exacerbated in the character coded environment due to limitations of the ASCII character set.

== See also ==
- Lists of English words by country or language of origin
- List of French expressions in English
- List of German expressions in English
- Metal umlaut – Gratuitous diacritic used in the names of some rock bands
