= Th (digraph) =

Latin-script digraph

Latin th digraph

Th is a digraph in the Latin script; it was originally introduced into Latin to transliterate Greek loanwords. In modern languages that use the Latin alphabet, it represents a number of different sounds. In modern English, it is the most common digraph in order of frequency.

== Sound values ==
=== Aspirated stop ===
The digraph ⟨th⟩ was first introduced in Latin to transliterate the letter theta ⟨Θ, θ⟩ in loans from Greek. Theta was pronounced as an aspirated stop /tʰ/ in Classical and early Koine Greek.

⟨th⟩ is used in academic transcription systems to represent letters in south and east Asian alphabets that have the value /tʰ/. According to the Royal Thai General System of Transcription, for example, ⟨th⟩ represents a series of Thai letters with the value /tʰ/.

⟨th⟩ is also used to transcribe the phoneme /tʰ/ in Southern Bantu languages, such as Zulu and Tswana.

=== Dental fricatives ===
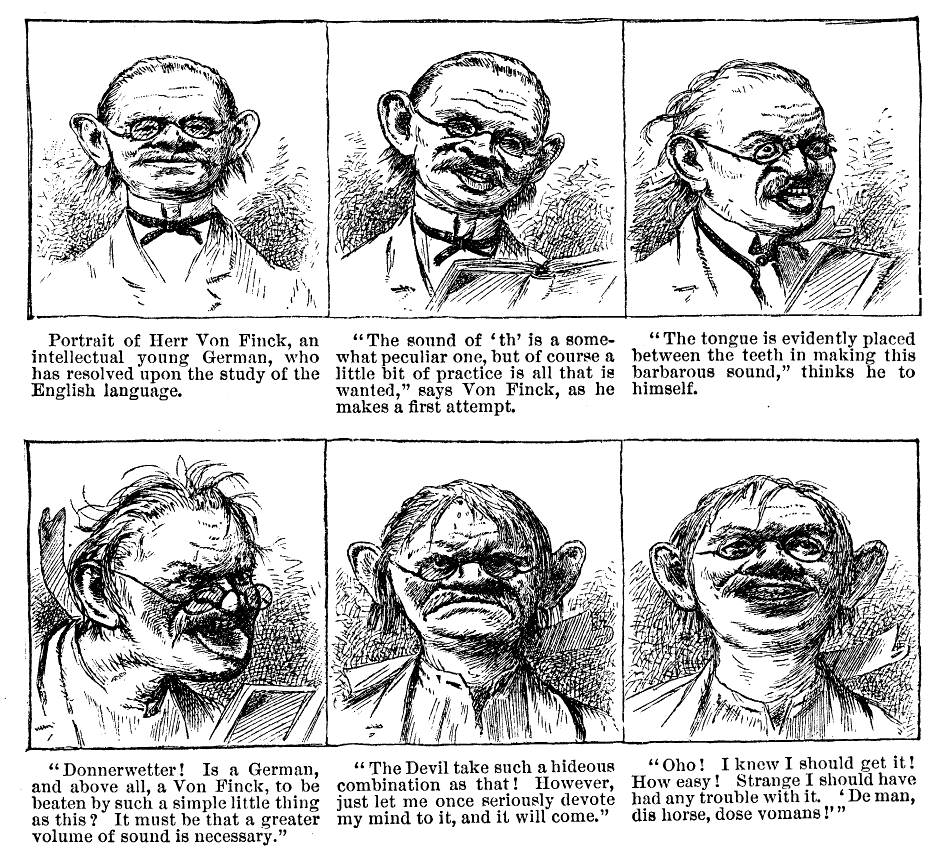
A. B. Frost's first comic: a German attempts to pronounce English-language "th" sounds (1879)

During late antiquity, the Greek phoneme represented by the letter ⟨θ⟩ mutated from an aspirated stop /tʰ/ to a dental fricative /θ/, as in think. This mutation affected the pronunciation of ⟨th⟩, which began to be used to represent the phoneme /θ/ in some of the languages that had it.

One of the earliest languages to use the digraph this way was Old High German, before the final phase of the High German consonant shift, in which /θ/ and /ð/ came to be pronounced /d/.

In early Old English of the 7th and 8th centuries, the digraph ⟨th⟩ was used until the Old English Latin alphabet adapted the runic letter ⟨þ⟩, as well as ⟨ð⟩, a modified version of the Latin letter ⟨d⟩, to represent this sound. Later, the digraph reappeared, gradually superseding these letters in Middle English.

In Old and Middle Irish, ⟨th⟩ was used for /θ/ as well, but the sound eventually changed into [h] (see below).

Other languages that use ⟨th⟩ for /θ/ include Albanian and Welsh, both of which treat it as a distinct letter and alphabetize it between ⟨t⟩ and ⟨u⟩.

English also uses ⟨th⟩ to represent the voiced dental fricative /ð/, as in this. This unusual extension of the digraph to represent a voiced sound is caused by the fact that, in Old English, the sounds [θ] and [ð] stood in allophonic relationship to each other and so did not need to be rigorously distinguished in spelling. The letters ⟨þ⟩ and ⟨ð⟩ were used indiscriminately for both sounds, and when these were replaced by ⟨th⟩ in the 15th century, it was likewise used for both sounds. (For the same reason, ⟨s⟩ is used in English for both /s/ and /z/.)

In the Norman dialect Jèrriais, the French phoneme /ʁ/ is realized as /ð/, and is spelled ⟨th⟩ under the influence of English.

=== Coronal stops ===
Because neither /tʰ/ nor /θ/ were native phonemes in Latin, the Greek sound represented by ⟨th⟩ came to be pronounced /t/. The spelling retained the digraph for etymological reasons. This practice was then borrowed into German, French, Dutch and other languages, where ⟨th⟩ still appears in originally Greek words, but is pronounced /t/. See German orthography. Interlingua also employs this pronunciation.

In early modern times, French, German and English all expanded this by analogy to words for which there is no etymological reason, but for the most part the modern spelling systems have eliminated this. Examples of unetymological ⟨th⟩ in English are the name of the River Thames from Middle English Temese and the name Anthony (though the ⟨th⟩ is often pronounced /θ/ under the influence of the spelling) from Latin Antonius.

In English, ⟨th⟩ for /t/ can also occur in loan-words from French or German, such as Neanderthal. The English name Thomas has initial /t/ because it was loaned from Norman.

In the transcription of Australian Aboriginal languages ⟨th⟩ represents a dental stop, /t̪/.

In the Latin alphabet for the Javanese language, ⟨th⟩ is used to transcribe the phoneme voiceless retroflex stop ʈ, which is written as ꦛ in the native Javanese script.

=== Celtic lenition ===
The Celtic languages have a pattern of consonant softening called lenition, which in Old Irish was marked with a dot above or below the letter, but later with digraphs ⟨th⟩, ⟨bh⟩, ⟨mh⟩, ⟨ch⟩, etc. Although this is modelled on the digraphs in Latin and English, the sound values represented are often different, and the underlying linguistic system is unrelated. In the case of ⟨th⟩, the effect can be debuccalization or neutralization.

==== Debuccalization ====
In Irish and Scottish Gaelic, ⟨th⟩ represents the lenition of ⟨t⟩. In most cases word-initially, it is pronounced /h/. For example: Irish and Scottish Gaelic toil [tɛlʲ] 'will' → do thoil [də hɛlʲ] 'your will'.

This use of digraphs with ⟨h⟩ to indicate lenition is distinct from the other uses which derive from Latin. While it is true that the presence of digraphs with ⟨h⟩ in Latin inspired the Goidelic usage, their allocation to phonemes is based entirely on the internal logic of the Goidelic languages. Lenition in Gaelic lettering was traditionally denoted in handwriting using an overdot but typesetters lacked these pre-composed types and substituted a trailing ⟨h⟩. It is also a consequence of their history: the digraph initially, in Old and Middle Irish, designated the phoneme /θ/, but later sound changes complicated and obscured the grapheme–sound correspondence, so that ⟨th⟩ is even found in some words like Scottish Gaelic piuthar 'sister' that never had a /θ/ to begin with. This is an example of "inverted (historical) spelling": the model of words where the original interdental fricative had disappeared between vowels caused ⟨th⟩ to be reinterpreted as a marker of hiatus.

==== Neutralization ====
The Irish and Scottish Gaelic lenited /t/ is silent in final position, as in Scottish Gaelic sgith /skiː/ 'tired'. And, rarely, it is silent in initial position, as in Scottish Gaelic thu /uː/ 'you'.

In English, the ⟨th⟩ in asthma and clothes is often silent.

== Graphical variants ==
A ligature of th.

U+1D7A ᵺ LATIN SMALL LETTER TH WITH STRIKETHROUGH is used for phonetic notation in some dictionaries.

A pair of th digraphs is used for the English Phonotypic Alphabet:

- U+1DF78 𝽸 LATIN CAPITAL LETTER PHONOTYPIC TH
- U+1DF79 𝽹 LATIN SMALL LETTER PHONOTYPIC TH
