= Hoyem =

Hoyem (and its variant Høyem) is a surname. Notable people with the surname include:

- Andrew Hoyem (born 1935), American publisher
- Lynn Hoyem (1939–1973), American football player
- Martin Høyem (born 1982), Norwegian football player
- Olav Jakobsen Høyem (1830–1899), Norwegian teacher
- Sivert Høyem (born 1976), Norwegian musician
- Tom Høyem (born 1941), Danish German educator and politician
