= Icelandic orthography =

Icelandic alphabet and spelling

Eth (Ð ð)

Thorn (Þ þ)

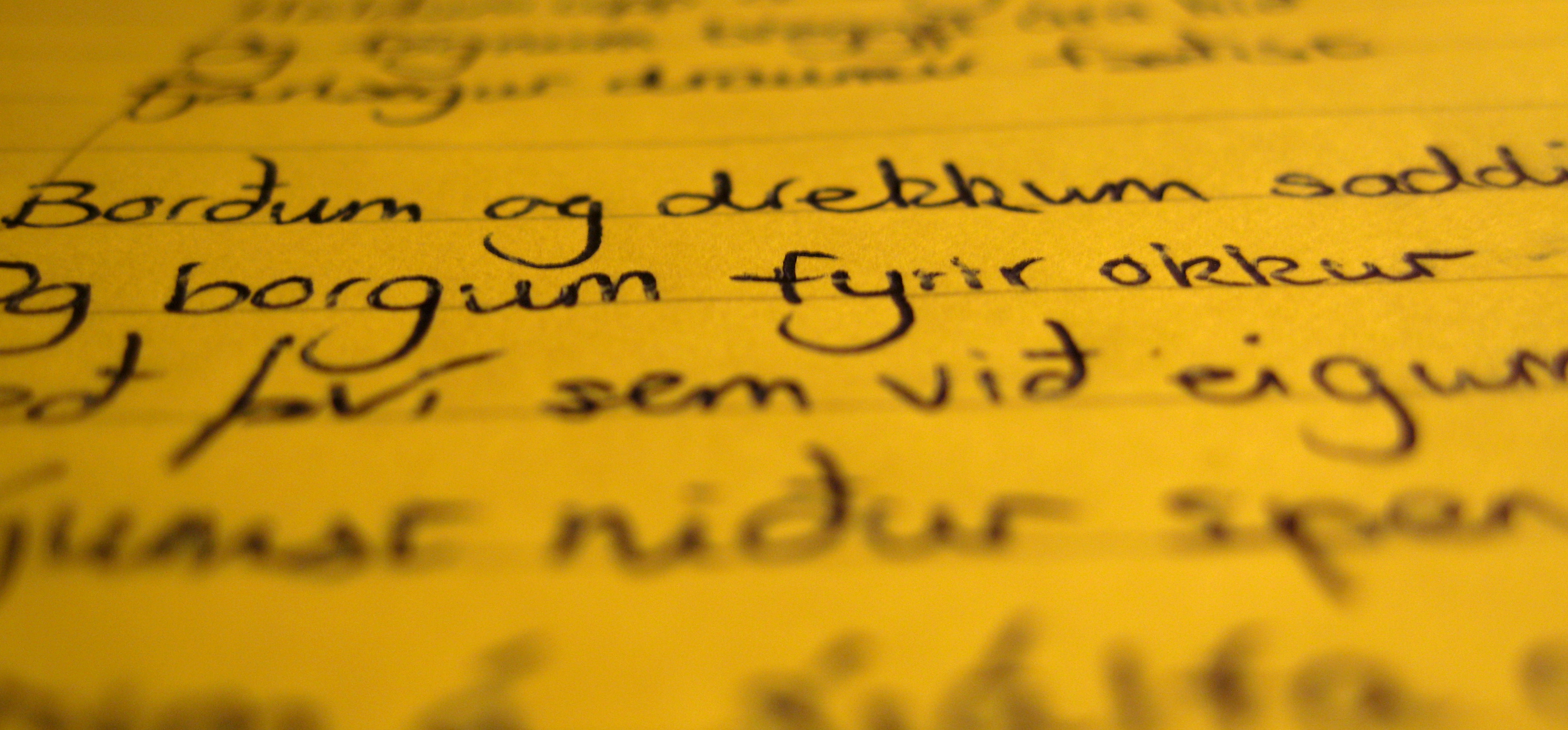
A handwriting extract; the Icelandic letters ⟨ð⟩ and ⟨þ⟩ are visible.

Icelandic orthography uses a Latin-script alphabet which has 32 letters. Compared with the 26 letters of the English alphabet, the Icelandic alphabet lacks C, Q, W, and Z, but additionally has Ð, Þ, Æ, and Ö. Six letters have forms with acute accents to produce Á, É, Í, Ó, Ú and Ý.

The letters eth (⟨ð⟩, capital ⟨Ð⟩), transliterated as ⟨dh⟩, and thorn (⟨þ⟩, capital ⟨Þ⟩), transliterated as ⟨th⟩, are widely used in the Icelandic language. Eth is also used in Faroese and Elfdalian, while thorn was used in many historical languages such as Old English. The letters ⟨æ⟩ (capital ⟨Æ⟩) and ⟨ö⟩ (capital ⟨Ö⟩) are considered completely separate letters in Icelandic and are collated as such, even though they originated as a ligature and a diacritical version respectively.

Icelandic words never start with ⟨ð⟩, which means its capital ⟨Ð⟩ occurs only when words are spelled in all capitals. The alphabet is as follows:

Icelandic alphabet
An Icelandic speaker reciting the alphabet in Icelandic

Majuscule forms (also called uppercase or capital letters)
A	Á	B	D	Ð	E	É	F	G	H	I	Í	J	K	L	M	N	O	Ó	P	R	S	T	U	Ú	V	X	Y	Ý	Z	Þ	Æ	Ö
Minuscule forms (also called lowercase or small letters)
a	á	b	d	ð	e	é	f	g	h	i	í	j	k	l	m	n	o	ó	p	r	s	t	u	ú	v	x	y	ý	z	þ	æ	ö

The above table has 33 letters, including the letter Z which is obsolete but may be found in older texts, e.g. verzlun became verslun.

Names of letters
Letter	Name	IPA	Frequency
Aa	a	[aː]	10.11%
Áá	á	[auː]	1.8%
Bb	bé	[pjɛː]	1.04%
Dd	dé	[tjɛː]	1.58%
Ðð	eð	[ɛːθ]	4.39%
Ee	e	[ɛː]	6.42%
Éé	é	[jɛː]	0.65%
Ff	eff	[ɛfː]	3.01%
Gg	ge	[cɛː]	4.24%
Hh	há	[hauː]	1.87%
Ii	i	[ɪː]	7.58%
Íí	í	[iː]	1.57%
Jj	joð	[jɔːθ]	1.14%
Kk	ká	[kʰauː]	3.31%
Ll	ell	[ɛtl̥]	4.53%
Mm	emm	[ɛmː]	4.04%
Nn	enn	[ɛnː]	7.71%
Oo	o	[ɔː]	2.17%
Óó	ó	[ouː]	0.99%
Pp	pé	[pʰjɛː]	0.79%
Rr	err	[ɛr̥ː]	8.58%
Ss	ess	[ɛsː]	5.63%
Tt	té	[tʰjɛː]	4.95%
Uu	u	[ʏː]	4.56%
Úú	ú	[uː]	0.61%
Vv	vaff	[vafː]	2.44%
Xx	ex	[ɛks]	0.05%
Yy	ufsilon y	[ˈʏfsɪlɔn ɪː]	0.9%
Ýý	ufsilon ý	[ˈʏfsɪlɔn iː]	0.23%
Zz	seta	[ˈsɛːta]	0.01%
Þþ	þorn	[θɔ(r)tn̥]	1.45%
Ææ	æ	[aiː]	0.87%
Öö	ö	[œː]	0.78%

The names of the letters are grammatically neuter (except the now obsolete ⟨z⟩ which is grammatically feminine).

The letters ⟨a⟩, ⟨á⟩, ⟨e⟩, ⟨é⟩, ⟨i⟩, ⟨í⟩, ⟨o⟩, ⟨ó⟩, ⟨u⟩, ⟨ú⟩, ⟨y⟩, ⟨ý⟩, ⟨æ⟩ and ⟨ö⟩ are considered vowels, and the remainder are consonants.

⟨c⟩ (sé, [sjɛː]), ⟨q⟩ (kú, [kʰuː]) and ⟨w⟩ (tvöfalt vaff, [ˈtʰvœːfal̥t ˌvafː]) are only used in Icelandic in words of foreign origin and some proper names that are also of foreign origin. Otherwise, ⟨c⟩, ⟨qu⟩, and ⟨w⟩ are replaced by ⟨k/s/ts⟩, ⟨hv⟩, and ⟨v⟩ respectively. (In fact, ⟨hv⟩ etymologically corresponds to Latin ⟨qu⟩ and English ⟨wh⟩ in words inherited from Proto-Indo-European: Icelandic hvað, Latin quod, English what.)

⟨z⟩ (seta, [ˈsɛːta]) was used until 1973, when it was retired, as it was only present for etymological reasons. It originally represented an affricate [t͡s], which arose from the combinations ⟨t⟩+⟨s⟩, ⟨d⟩+⟨s⟩, ⟨ð⟩+⟨s⟩; however, in modern Icelandic, it came to be pronounced [s], and since it was a letter that was kind of redundant, it was decided in 1973 to replace all native instances of ⟨z⟩ with ⟨s⟩. However, one of the most important newspapers in Iceland, Morgunblaðið, still uses it sometimes (although very rarely), a hot-dog chain, Bæjarins Beztu Pylsur, and a secondary school, Verzlunarskóli Íslands have it in their names. It is also found in some proper names (e.g. Zakarías, Haralz, Zoëga), and loanwords such as pizza (also written pítsa). Older people who were educated before the abolition of the ⟨z⟩ sometimes also use it. Prior to the 1973 reform, the letter ⟨z⟩ in Icelandic was restricted to the middle or end of word stems to represent specific historical consonant collapses. Consequently, native Icelandic vocabulary never began with the letter ⟨z⟩, with initial usage limited to foreign loanwords or names.

While ⟨c⟩, ⟨q⟩, ⟨w⟩, and ⟨z⟩ are found on the Icelandic keyboard, they are rarely used in Icelandic; they are used in some proper names of Icelanders, mainly family names (family names are the exception in Iceland). ⟨c⟩ is used on road signs (to indicate city centre) according to European regulation, and cm is used for the centimetre according to the international SI system (while it may be written out as sentimetri). Many believe these letters should be included in the alphabet, as its purpose is a tool to collate (sort into the correct order), and practically that is done, i.e. computers treat the alphabet as a superset of the English alphabet. The alphabet as taught in schools up to about 1980 has these 36 letters (and computers still order this way): Aa, Áá, Bb, Cc, Dd, Ðð, Ee, Éé, Ff, Gg, Hh, Ii, Íí, Jj, Kk, Ll, Mm, Nn, Oo, Óó, Pp, Qq, Rr, Ss, Tt, Uu, Úú, Vv, Ww, Xx, Yy, Ýý, Zz, Þþ, Ææ, Öö.

== History ==
The modern Icelandic alphabet developed from a standard established in the 19th century (primarily by Danish linguist Rasmus Rask). It is ultimately based heavily on an orthographic standard created in the early 12th century by a document referred to as The First Grammatical Treatise, author unknown. The standard was intended for the common North Germanic language Old Norse. It did not have much influence, however, at the time.

The most defining characteristics of the alphabet were established in the old treatise:

- Use of the acute accent (originally to signify vowel length).
- Use of ⟨þ⟩, also used in the Old English alphabet as the letter thorn.

The later Rasmus Rask standard was a re-enactment of the old treatise, with some changes to fit concurrent North Germanic conventions, such as the exclusive use of ⟨k⟩ rather than ⟨c⟩. Various old features, like ⟨ð⟩, had not seen much use in the later centuries, so Rask's standard constituted a major change in practice.

Later 20th-century changes are most notably the adoption of ⟨é⟩, which had previously been written as ⟨je⟩ (reflecting the modern pronunciation), and the replacement of ⟨z⟩ with ⟨s⟩ in 1973.

== Spelling-to-sound correspondence ==
This section lists Icelandic letters and letter combinations and their phonemic representation in the International Phonetic Alphabet.

=== Vowels ===
Icelandic vowels may be either long or short, but this distinction is only relevant in stressed syllables: unstressed vowels are neutral in quantitative aspect. The vowel length is determined by the consonants that follow the vowel: if there is only one consonant before another vowel or at the end of the word (i.e., CVCV or CVC# syllable structure), the vowel is long; if there are more than one (CVCCV), counting geminates and pre-aspirated stops as CC, the vowel is short. There are, however, some exceptions to this rule:

1. A vowel is long when the first consonant following it is [p t k s] and the second [v j r], e.g. esja, vepja, akrar, vökvar, tvisvar.
2. A vowel is usually kept long in one syllable morphemes or words ending in [p t k s]; notably in:
  1. Compounds, e.g. matmál, skipsskrokkur.
    1. Though the morpheme boundary may be blurred and words such as Ísland and its derivatives have both variants.
    2. The usage is also indecise for the non-compound verbs vitka 'to grow wiser' and litka 'to stain'.
  2. Word + preposition sequences, e.g. mat með.
  3. Genitives, e.g. báts, skaks.
    1. Alternatively influenced by the s, e.g. báts [ˈpau(t)sː], skips [ˈscɪfs], skaks [ˈskaxs] (Note: áss 'i. a. one of the Æsir GEN' could be pronounced [ˈausː] as a spelling pronunciation for clarity (the Old Norse etymon áss, ǫ́ss already had a double s which degeminated word finally as a rule).) (alongside [ˈpauːts], [ˈscɪːps], [ˈskaːks]).

Vowels
Grapheme	Sound (IPA)				Examples
Grapheme	Long	Short	Before ⟨gi⟩ [jɪ]	Before ⟨ng⟩ or ⟨nk⟩	Examples
a	[aː]	[a]	[ai]	[au]	taska [ˈtʰaska] "handbag" taka [ˈtʰaːka] "to take" svangur [ˈsvauŋkʏr̥] "hungry"
á	[auː]	[au]			lás [lauːs] "lock"
au	[œyː]	[œy]			þau [θœyː] "they"
e	[ɛː]	[ɛ]	[ei]		vegur [ˈvɛːɣʏr̥] "a way" egg [ˈɛkː] "egg" Hengifoss [ˈheiɲcɪˌfɔsː] "Hengifoss"
é	[jɛː]	[jɛ]			ég [jɛːx] "I"
ei, ey	[eiː]	[ei]			skeið [sceiːθ] "spoon" ey [eiː] "island"
i, y	[ɪː]	[ɪ]	[i]		sin [sɪːn] "sinew" syngja [ˈsiŋca] "to sing"
í, ý	[iː]	[i]			dís [ˈtiːs] "goddess"
o	[ɔː]	[ɔ]	[ɔi]	[ou]	lofa [ˈlɔːva] "to promise" logn [ˈlɔk.n̥] "windstill"
ó	[ouː]	[ou]			rós [rouːs] "rose" dóttir [ˈtouhtɪr̥] "daughter"
u	[ʏː]	[ʏ]	[ʏi]	[u]	hundur [ˈhʏntʏr̥] "dog" tungl [ˈtʰuŋl] "moon"
ú	[uː]	[u]			þú [θuː] "you"
æ	[aiː]	[ai]			læsa [ˈlaiːsa] "to lock" hæll [ˈhaitl̥] "heel"
ö	[œː]	[œ]	[œy]		ör [œːr] "scar" Hörður [ˈhœrðʏr̥] given name söngur [ˈsœyŋkʏr̥] "song, singing"

=== Consonants ===
Consonants
Grapheme	Phonetic realization (IPA)	Examples
b	between ⟨m, n⟩ and ⟨t, d, g, s⟩: ∅	kembt [cʰɛm̥t] "combed PP"
b	in most cases: [p] unaspirated voiceless bilabial stop	bær [paiːr̥] "a town"
d	between ⟨l⟩ or ⟨n⟩ and ⟨l, n, k, g, s⟩: ∅	lands [lans] "a land's GEN"
d	in most cases: [t] unaspirated voiceless dental stop	dalur [ˈtaːlʏr̥] "a valley"
ð	between vowels, between a vowel and a voiced consonant, word finally: [ð̠] voiced alveolar approximant	eða [ˈɛːða] "or"
ð	before an aspirated consonant (Note: Here is meant phonemically (pre-)aspirated, i.e. graphical ⟨p, t, k, h⟩. No stricto sensu aspiration) and before a pause: [θ̠] voiceless alveolar non-sibilant fricative	maðkur [ˈmaθkʏr̥] "a worm" bað [paːθ] "a bath"
ð	between ⟨r⟩ and ⟨n⟩, and between ⟨g⟩ and ⟨s⟩: ∅	harðna [ˈhat.na] "to harden" bragðs [praxs] or "a trick's GEN, a flavour's GEN"
f	word initially or before an aspirated consonant, when doubled and before a pause: [f]	faðir [ˈfaːðɪr̥] "a father" loft [ˈlɔft] "some air, a sky" kaffi [ˈkʰafːɪ] "a coffee"
f	between vowels, between a vowel and a voiced consonant, or word finally: [v]	lofa [ˈlɔːva] "to promise" úlfur [ˈulvʏr̥] "a wolf"
f	before ⟨l⟩ or ⟨n⟩: [p]	Keflavík [ˈcʰɛp.laˌviːk] "Keflavík"
f	between ⟨á, ó, ú⟩ and ⟨a, o, u⟩: ∅	prófa [ˈpʰrouː.a] "to test"
fnd	[mt] (Note: Such clusters may be pronounced with an epenthetic homorganic stop.)	hefnd [hɛmt] "a revenge"
fnt	[m̥t] (voiceless)	nefnt [nɛm̥t] "named"
g	word initially: before a consonant, ⟨a, á, o, ó, u, ú⟩ or ⟨ö⟩; between a vowel and ⟨l⟩ or ⟨n⟩; after a consonant: (Note: Also often before genitive -s) [k] unaspirated voiceless velar stop	glápa [ˈklauːpa] "to stare" logn [ˈlɔk.n̥] "windstill" borg [ˈpɔrk] "a city"
g	word initially, before ⟨e, é, i, í, y, ý⟩ or ⟨æ⟩: [c] unaspirated voiceless palatal stop	geta [ˈcɛːta] "to be able, AUX"
g	between a vowel and ⟨a, u, ð, r⟩; or word finally after a vowel: [ɣ] voiced velar fricative	fluga [ˈflʏːɣa] "a fly" sigra [ˈsɪɣra] "a triumph"
g	before ⟨t⟩ or before a pause: [x] voiceless velar fricative	dragt [traxt] "a suit" lag [laːx] "a layer"
g	between a vowel and ⟨j⟩ or ⟨i⟩: [j] palatal approximant	segja [ˈsɛija] "to say"
g	between ⟨á, ó, ú⟩ and ⟨a, o, u⟩: ∅	fljúga [ˈfljuː.a] "to fly"
gj	[c] unaspirated voiceless palatal stop	gjalda [ˈcalta] "to pay"
h	[h] voiceless glottal fricative	hús [ˈhuːs] "a house" hafa [ˈhaːva] "to have"
hj	[ç] voiceless palatal fricative	Hjörsey [ˈçœr̥sˌeiː] "Hjörsey"
hl	[l̥] voiceless alveolar lateral approximant	hlýr [ˈl̥iːr̥] "warm" hljóðfæri [ˈl̥jouð.faiːrɪ] "musical instrument"
hn	[n̥] voiceless alveolar nasal	hné [ˈn̥jɛː] "a knee"
hr	[r̥] voiceless alveolar trill	Hrólfur [ˈr̥oulvʏr̥] "male name, Rudolph"
hv	[kʰv] (Note: /xʷ/ or /x/ among some older speakers in southern Iceland. [xʷasː])	hvass [ˈkʰvasː] "sharp"
j	[j]	já [jauː] "yes"
k	word initially, before a consonant, ⟨a, á, o, ó, u, ú⟩ or ⟨ö⟩: [kʰ]	kanína [ˈkʰaːnina] "a rabbit"
k	word initially, before ⟨e, é, i, í, y, ý⟩ or ⟨æ⟩: [cʰ] aspirated voiceless palatal stop	kýr [ˈcʰiːr̥] "a cow"
k	other contexts, before ⟨a, á, o, ó, u, ú⟩ or ⟨ö⟩: [k]	skór [ˈskouːr̥] "a shoe" haka [ˈhaːka] "a chin"
k	other contexts, before ⟨e, é, i, í, y, ý⟩ or ⟨æ⟩: [c] unaspirated voiceless palatal stop	ský [ˈsciː] "a cloud"
k	before ⟨l, m, n⟩: [hk]	Hekla [ˈhɛhkla] "volcano" læknir [ˈlaihknɪr̥] "a physician"
k	before ⟨t⟩: [x] voiceless velar fricative	október [ˈɔxtoupɛr̥] "October"
kj	word initially: [cʰ] aspirated voiceless palatal stop	kjöt [ˈcʰœːt] "meat"
kj	other contexts: [c] unaspirated voiceless palatal stop	askja [ˈasca] "a small box"
kk	[hk], [hc]	þakka [ˈθahka] "to thank" drykkja [ˈtrɪhca] "drinking" "stuttur frakki" [ˈstʏhtʏr ˈfrahcɪ] "film title, Short raincoat"
l	next to an aspirated consonant, before a pause: [l̥] voiceless alveolar lateral approximant	alltaf [ˈal̥taf] "always" sól [ˈsouːl̥] "sun"
l	in most cases: [l]	lás [ˈlauːs] "lock"
ll	at morpheme boundaries, in loanwords, pet names, slang, and stereotypical children's vocabulary: [lː]	heillegur [ˈheilːɛɣʏr] "seemingly intact" bolla [ˈpɔlːa] "bun, bread roll" mylla [ˈmɪlːa] "mill"
ll	in most cases: [tl]	bolli [ˈpɔt.lɪ] "cup" milli [ˈmɪt.lɪ] "between"
m	before aspirated consonants: [m̥]	fimmtán [ˈfɪm̥taun] "fifteen"
m	in most cases: [m]	mús [ˈmuːs] "mús"
n	after and before aspirated consonants, between a voiceless consonant and a pause: [n̥]	planta [ˈpʰlan̥ta] "plant" hné [ˈn̥jɛː] "knee" nafn [ˈnap.n̥] "name"
n	in most cases: [n]	nafn [ˈnap.n̥] "name"
ng	before ⟨d, l, s⟩: [ŋ]	kringla [ˈkʰriŋla] "disc" gangs [ˈkauŋs] "movement's GEN"
ng	in most cases: [ŋk], [ɲc]	vængur [ˈvaiŋkʏr̥] "wing" engi [ˈeiɲcɪ] "meadow"
nk	[ŋ̊k], [ɲ̊c]	hönk [ˈhœyŋ̊k] "coil, loop" banki [ˈpauɲ̊cɪ] "bank"
nn	after broad vowels (accent bearing and graphical diphthongs): [tn]	einna [ˈeit.na] "one's GEN.PL" fínna [ˈfit.na] "fine GEN.PL"
nn	between broad vowels and a pause: [tn̥]	einn [ˈeit.n̥] "one" fínn [ˈfit.n̥] "fine"
nn	elsewhere: [nː]	finna [ˈfɪnːa] "to find"
p	word initially: [pʰ] aspirated voiceless bilabial stop	par [ˈpʰaːr̥] "pair"
p	other contexts: [p] unaspirated voiceless bilabial stop	spara [ˈspaːra] "to save" kápa [ˈkʰauːpa] "coat"
p	before ⟨t, k⟩ and ⟨s⟩ (Note: Often not genitive -s.): [f] voiceless labiodental fricative	September [ˈsɛftɛmpɛr̥] "September"
p	before ⟨l, m, n, p⟩: [hp]	epli [ˈɛhplɪ] "apple(s)" vopn [ˈvɔhpn̥] "weapon(s)" stoppa [ˈstɔhpa] "to stop"
r	word initially and between vowels: [r] (voiced alveolar trill or tap)	rigna [ˈrɪk.na] "to rain" læra [ˈlaiːra] "to learn"
r	before and after aspirated consonants and before a pause: [r̥] (voiceless alveolar trill or tap)	svartur [ˈsvar̥tʏr̥] "black"
rl	[rtl], (Note: The pronunciation change rl→[tl] and rn→[tn], shared with much of Western Norway, didn't occurred later than the 14th century. Pronouncing them as [rtl] and [rtn] is a more recent development that may have been influenced by the orthography.) mostly [tl] (Note: Most ⟨rtn, rtl⟩ clusters can be pronounced [tn, tl] but this is subject to formality, dialectal and idiosyncratic variations.)	karlasni [ˈkʰat.lastnɪ] "masculinity"
rl	before a consonant (forming a cluster that does not simplify) or at the end of words: [rtl̥], mostly [tl̥]	karlmaður [ˈkʰatl̥ˌmaðʏr̥] "man"
rn	[rtn], mostly [tn]	þorna [ˈθɔ(r)t.na] "thorns' (Þs') GEN.PL"
rn	before a consonant (forming a cluster that does not simplify) or at the end of words: [rtn̥], mostly [tn̥]	þorn [ˈθɔ(r)t.n̥] "the name of the letter Þ/þ"
rn	before ⟨d⟩: [rn]	vernd [ˈvɛrnt] "protection"
s	[s] (Note: In genitives of words already ending in -s, genitival -s are silent and don't influence the preceding vowel's length)	sósa [ˈsouːsa] "sauce"
sl	[stl̥]	rusla [rʏstl̥a] "to litter" rusl [rʏstl̥] "garbage"
sn	[stn]	býsna [ˈpistna] "pretty, rather"
sn	before a pause or a consonant (forming a cluster that does not simplify): [stn̥]	býsn [ˈpistn̥] "wonder, multitude"
t	word initially: [tʰ] aspirated voiceless dental stop	taka [ˈtʰaːka] "take"
t	before ⟨l, m, n, t⟩: [ht]	Atli [ˈahtlɪ] "Attila" rytmi [rɪhtmɪ] "rhythm" vatn [ˈvahtn̥] "water" detta [ˈtɛhta] "to fall"
t	elsewhere: [t] unaspirated voiceless dental stop	stela [ˈstɛːla] "to steal" skutur [ˈskʏːtʏr̥] "stern"
v	[v]	vera [ˈvɛːra] "to be"
x	[ks] (Note: The standard pronunciation of native words spelled with ⟨x, gs⟩ used to be [xs] (and still often is) but since the 60' a mass adoption of [ks] is observed.)	lax [ˈlaks] "salmon"
z	[s]	beztur [ˈpɛstʏr̥] "the best" (former orthography); Zakarías [ˈsaːkaˌri.as] "Zachary"
þ	[θ̠] voiceless alveolar non-sibilant fricative	þú [ˈθuː] "you" Aþena [ˈaːθɛna] "Athens"

Simplified table
Grapheme	p	b	f	v	t	d	þ	ð	k	g	kj	gj	s	h	j	l	r	m	n	nk	ng	x
sometimes	[f] (before ⟨k, s⟩)	∅ (between ⟨m⟩ and ⟨t, d, g, s⟩)	∅ (between ⟨ó⟩ and a vowel)			∅ (between ⟨l⟩ or ⟨n⟩ and ⟨l, n, k, g, s⟩)		∅ (between ⟨r⟩ and ⟨n⟩, and between ⟨g⟩ and ⟨s⟩)		∅ (between ⟨á, ó, ú⟩, and ⟨a, o, u⟩); [ɣ] (between a vowel and ⟨a, u, ð, r⟩); [j] (between a vowel and ⟨j⟩ or ⟨i⟩); [x] (before ⟨s⟩ or before a pause)											[ŋ] (before ⟨l, d, s⟩)	
word initially, before a vowel	[pʰ]	[p]	[f]	[v]	[tʰ]	[t]	[θ̠]	-	[kʰ], [cʰ]	[k], [c]	[cʰ]	[c]	[s]	[h]	[j]	[l]	[r]	[m]	[n]	-		-
between vowels	[p]		[v]		[t]		[θ̠]	[ð̠]	[k], [c]		[c]		[s]	-	[j]	[l]	[r]	[m]	[n]	[ŋ̊k], [ɲ̊c]	[ŋk], [ɲc]	-
doubled	[hp]	-	[f]	-	[ht]	-	-		[hk], [hc]	-	-			-	-	[tl]	[rː]	[mː]	[nː], [tn̥]	-		-
near aspirated consonants	[p]		[f]	[v]	[t]		[θ̠]	[θ̠]	[k], [c]		[c]		[s]	-	[j]	[l̥]	[r̥]	[m̥]	[n̥]	-		-
near voiced consonants	[p]		[v]	[v]	[t]		[θ̠]	[ð̠]	[k], [c]		[c]		[s]	-	[j]	[l]	[r]	[m]	[n]	-		-
before ⟨l⟩	[hp]	-	[p]	-	[ht]	-	-		[hk]	-	-		[st]	-	-	-	[(r)t]	-	-	-		-
before ⟨n⟩	[hp]	-	[p]	-	[ht]	-	-		[hk]	-	-		[st]	-	-	-	[(r)t]	-	-	-		-
before ⟨m⟩	[hp]	-	-	-	[ht]	-	-		[hk]	-	-		-	-	-	-	-	-	-	-		-
before ⟨t⟩	[f]	-	-	-	-	-	-		[x]	[x]	-		-	-	-	-	-	-	-	-		-
word finally	[p]		[v]		[t]		[θ̠]	[ð̠], [θ̠]	[k]	[ɣ]	[c]		[s]	-	[j]	[l̥]	[r], [r̥]	[m]	[n]	[ŋ̊k], [ɲ̊c]	[ŋk], [ɲc]	[ks]
combined with h	-		-	[kʰv]	-		-		-		-		-	-	[ç]	[l̥]	[r̥]	-	[n̥]	-		-
combined with nd, nt	-		[mt], [m̥t]	-																		

== Code pages ==
The alphabet is included in Unicode, in code page 861. Historically, Icelandic text was supported by ISO 8859-1, followed by Windows-1252, which added various characters unrelated to Icelandic. ISO 8859-15 also includes support for Icelandic characters.

== See also ==
- Icelandic Encyclopedia A–Ö
