= Old English Latin alphabet =

Alphabet used from 7th to 12th centuries

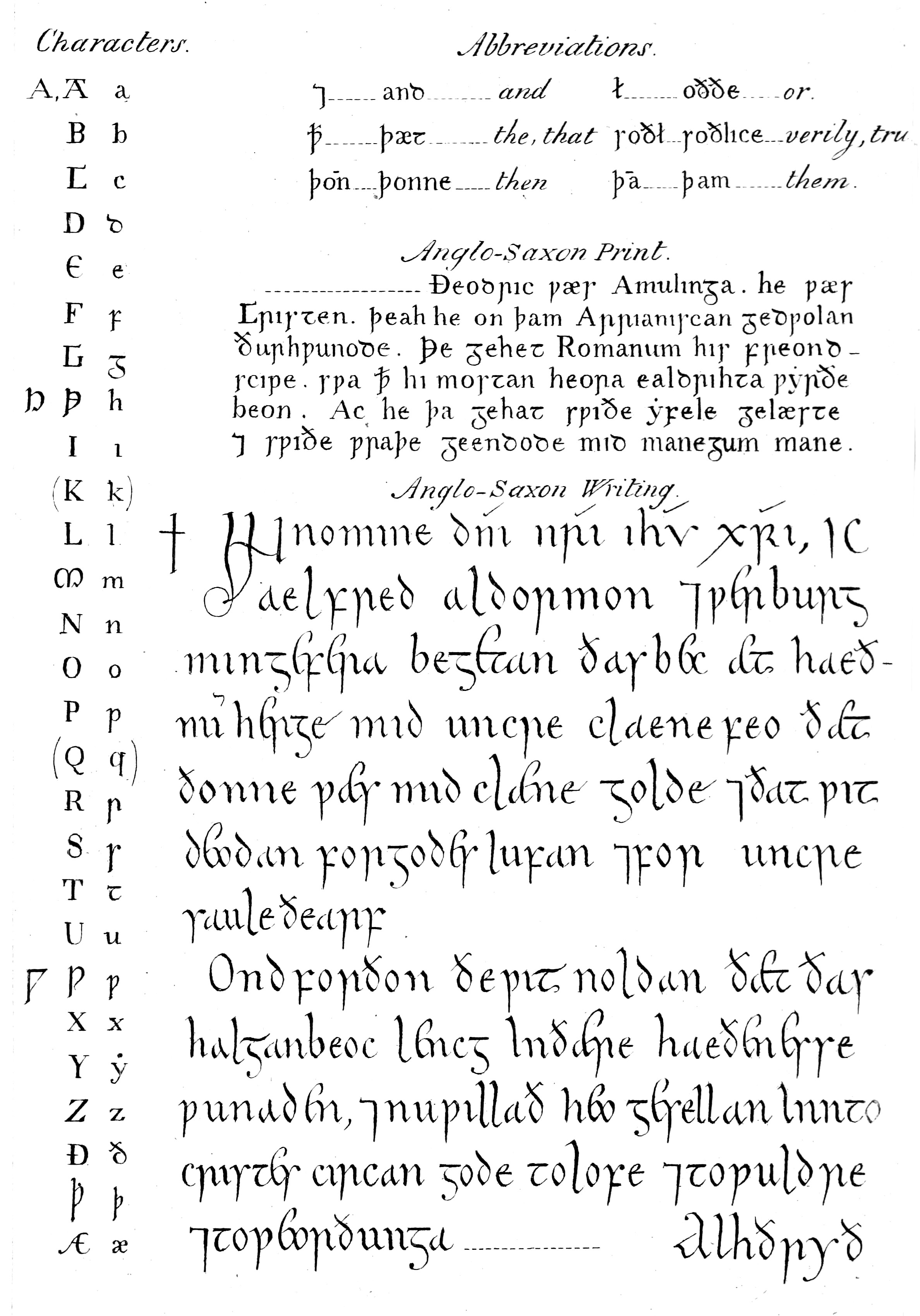
Old English letters, common abbreviations, and samples of written text

The Old English Latin alphabet generally consisted of about 24 letters, and was used for writing Old English from the 7th to the 12th centuries. Of these letters, most were directly adopted from the Latin alphabet, two were modified Latin letters (Æ, Ð), and two developed from the runic alphabet (Ƿ, Þ). The letters Q and Z were essentially left unused outside of foreign names from Latin and Greek. The letter J had not yet come into use. The letter K was used by some writers but not by others. W gained usage in late Old English under Norman influence, as seen towards the end of the Peterborough Chronicle manuscript, though in this period W was still a ligature and not a full-fledged letter. The manuscripts MS Harley 208, Stowe MS 57, and Cotton Titus D 18 differ in how they arrange the non-standard Old English letters (Harley has Ƿ–Ð–Æ–Þ, Stowe has Ƿ–Ð–Þ, Titus has Ƿ–Þ–Ð), but all three manuscripts place the non-standard letters after the standard Latin letters.

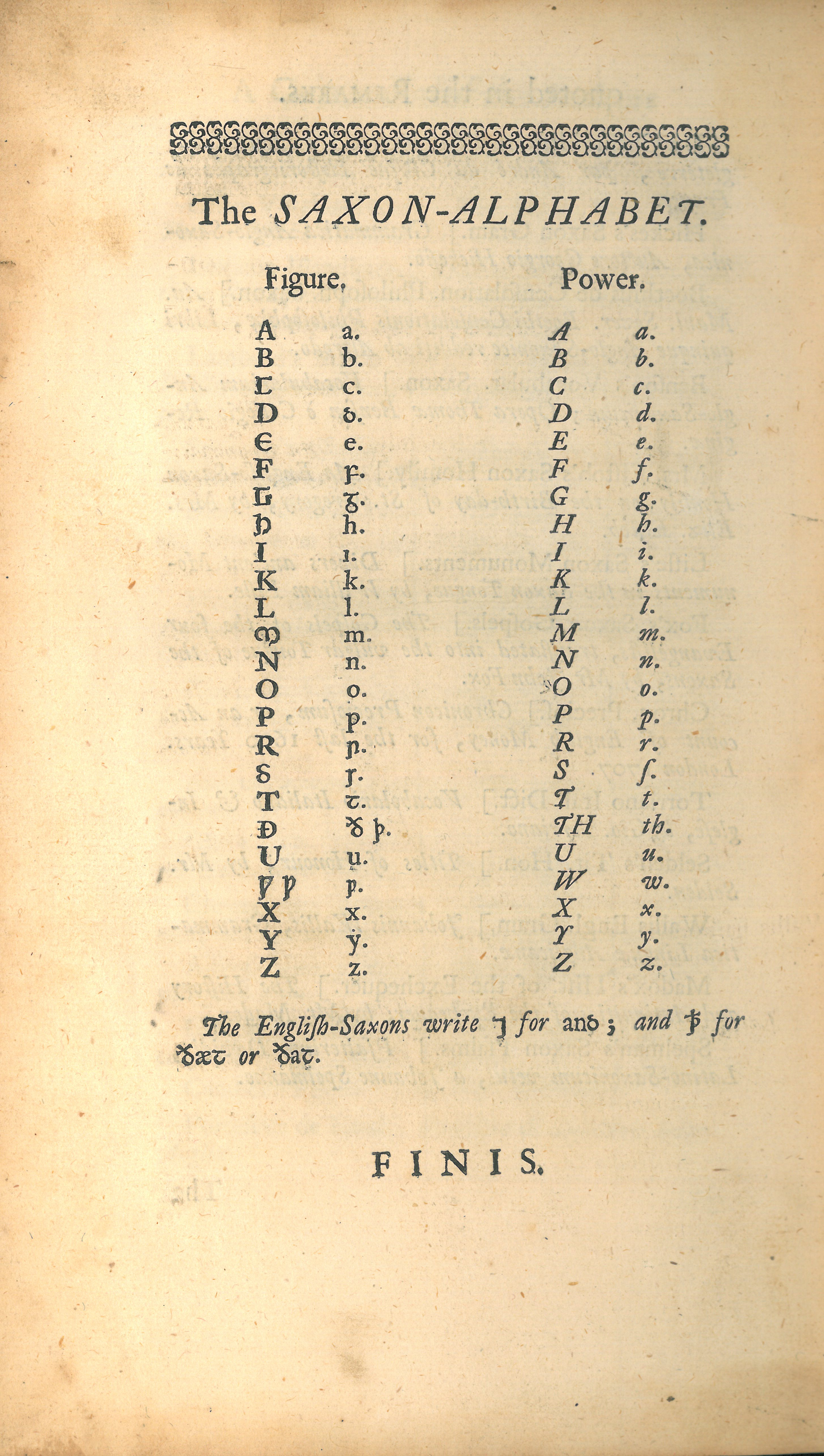
Anglo-Saxon and modern letters in The Difference between an Absolute and Limited Monarchy by John Fortescue Aland, 1714

Old English letters and sound correspondences (Note: Letters marked with an asterisk (*) exhibited mixed usage with insular forms; their modern glyphs are standardizations.)

Letter	IPA
A, a	/ɑ(ː)/
B, b	/b/
C*, c	/k/, /tʃ/
D, d*	/d/
E, e	/e(ː)/
F, f*	/f/, [v]
G*, g*	/g/, [ɣ], /j/
H*, h	/h/, [x], [ç]
I, i*	/i(ː)/
K, k	/k/
L, l	/l/
M*, m	/m/
N, n	/n/
O, o	/o(ː)/
P, p	/p/
R, r*	/r/
S*, s*	/s/
T, t*	/t/
U, u	/u(ː)/, /w/ (rare)
X, x	/ks/
Y, y	/y(ː)/
Z, z	/z/
Ƿ*, ƿ	/w/
Ð, ð	/θ/, [ð]
Þ, þ	/θ/, [ð]
Æ, æ	/æ(ː)/

Digraph	IPA
cg	[dʒ]
ch (rare)	[x]
ea	/æɑ(ː)/
eo	/eo(ː)/
gc (rare)	[dʒ]
ie	perhaps /iy(ː)/
io	perhaps /iu(ː)/
ng	[ŋg], [ndʒ]
sc	/sk/, /ʃ/
th (rare)	/θ/, [ð]
uu (rare)	/w/

Trigraph	IPA
cgg (rare)	[dʒ]
ncg (rare)	[ndʒ]

== History ==
Old English was first written using Anglo-Saxon runes in the 5th century. In 597, the arrival of the Gregorian mission in Kent marked the beginning of the Christianisation of Anglo-Saxon England, and with it the reintroduction of the Latin alphabet to Britain, where it was used to write English for the first time. The earliest attested instances of Old English being written using the Latin script were in Anglo-Saxon law codes, including the Law of Æthelberht, drawn up in 616 on behalf of King Æthelberht of Kent. A minuscule half-uncial form of the alphabet was introduced with the Hiberno-Scottish mission during the 8th century. This was replaced by insular script, a cursive and pointed version of the half-uncial script. This was used until the end of the 12th century when continental Carolingian minuscule replaced insular usage, along with a shift in spelling conventions toward the Old French alphabet, leading to Middle English.

The letter eth ⟨ð⟩ was an alteration of Latin ⟨d⟩, and the runic letters thorn ⟨þ⟩ and wynn ⟨ƿ⟩ are borrowings from Futhorc. Also used was a symbol for the conjunction and, a character similar to the number seven (⟨⁊⟩, called ond or a Tironian et) which is still used in Irish and Scottish Gaelic, and a symbol for the relative pronoun þæt, a thorn with a crossbar through the ascender (⟨ꝥ⟩). Macrons ⟨¯⟩ over vowels were used, though rarely, to indicate long vowels. A macron was also used occasionally as a nasal indicator.

== Bibliography ==
- Bosworth, J. & Toller, T. Northcote (1898). An Anglo-Saxon Dictionary. Oxford, UK: Clarendon Press.
