= H with left hook =

Additional letter of the latin script

Usage
- Writing system: Latin script
- Type: alphabetic
- Language of origin: Abaza language, Kabardian language, proposed for Sotho-Tswana languages
- Sound values: [ʔ]
- Alphabetical position: 11th

History
- Time period: 1920-30
- Transliterations: Ъ, Ӏ

Other
- Writing direction: left to right

H with left hook is an additional letter of the Latin script which was used in the writing of the Abaza and the Kabardian languages in the 1920s and was proposed for the writing of the Sotho-Tswana language in 1929.

== Usage ==
A. N. Tucker used h with left hook in his proposal for an alphabet for the Sotho-Tswana language in 1929, with a capital form based on the form of the capital letter H.

Clement Martyn Doke used h with left hook to represent a prevelar fricative notably in the description of the Pulana and Kutswe dialects of the Northern Sotho language.

H with left hook was used in the writing of certain languages of the Soviet Union in the 1930s.

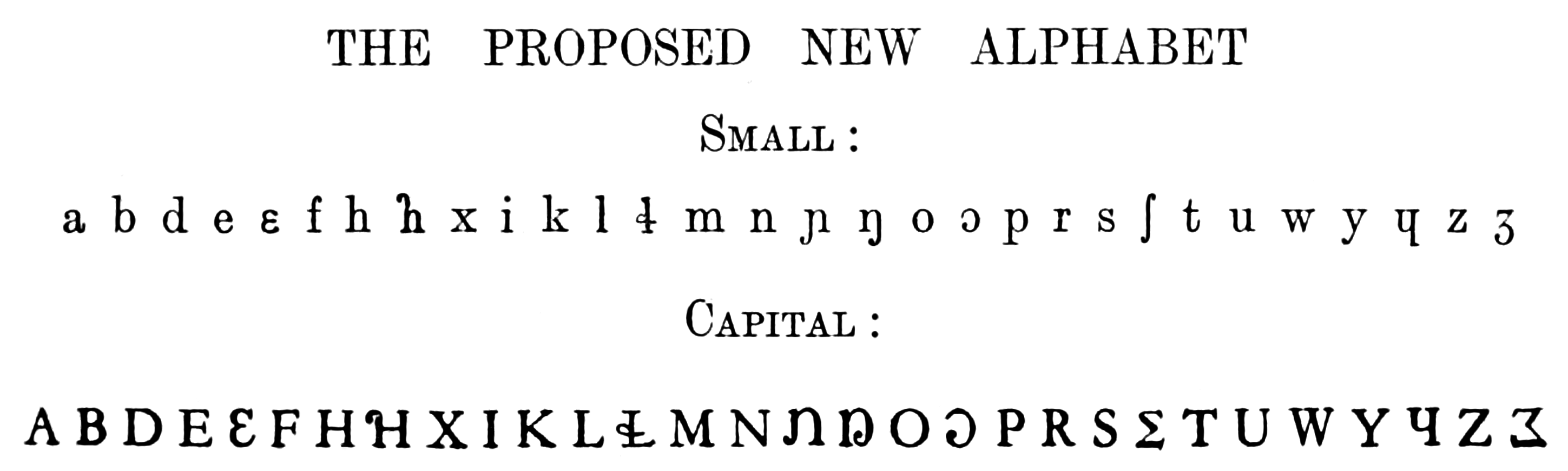
Sotho-Tswana alphabet proposed by Tucker in 1929.

== Gallery ==
Capital form proposed by A. N. Tucker for the Sotho-Tswana language in 1929. It is essentially equivalent to ⟨Ɦ⟩, which is a capital H with hook.

Capital form used in the Abaza and Kabardian languages.

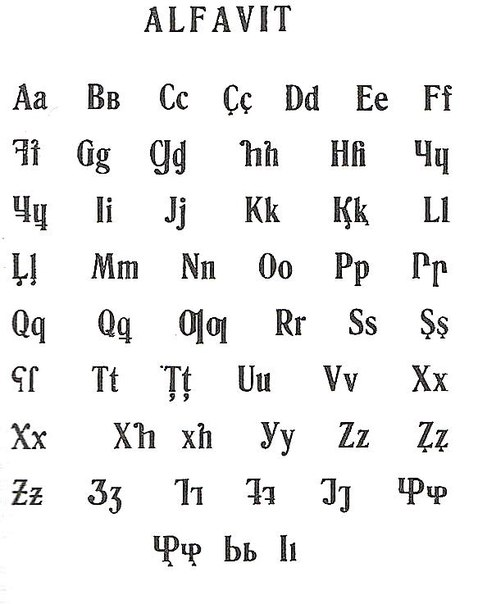
Abaza alphabet from the 1930s
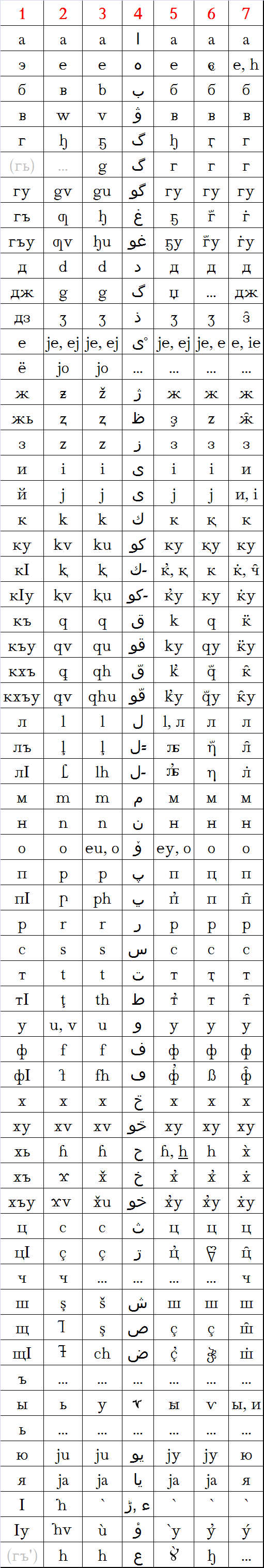
Kabardian alphabets throughout history, showing h with left hook (column 2, towards the bottom).

== Computing codes ==
H with left hook has not yet been encoded in Unicode, though a variant of the capital is homoglyphic with U+A7AA Ɦ LATIN CAPITAL LETTER H WITH HOOK.

== Bibliography ==
- Doke, Clement Martyn (1954). The Souther Bantu languages. International African Institute, Oxford University Press.
- Joomagueldinov, Nurlan; Pentzlin, Karl; Yevlampiev, Ilya (2012). Revised proposal to encode Latin letters used in the Former Soviet Union (PDF).
- Tucker, A. N. (1929). The comparative phonetics of the Suto-Chuana group of Bantu languages.

== See also ==
- Latinisation in the Soviet Union
