= Wynn =

Letter of the Old English alphabet

- Ƿ ƿ
- (See below)

Usage
- Writing system: Adapted from Futhorc into Latin script
- Type: Alphabetic and logographic
- Language of origin: Old English
- Sound values: [w] /wɪn/
- In Unicode: U+01F7, U+01BF

History
- Development: ᚹ: Ƿ ƿ
- Time period: 700s to 1300s
- Sisters: Ꝩ ꝩ
- Transliterations: w
- Variations: (See below)

Other
- Associated graphs: w
- Writing direction: Left-to-right

Name	Proto-Germanic	Old English
Name	*Wunjō	Wynn
Name	"joy"	
Shape	Elder Futhark	Futhorc
Unicode	ᚹ U+16B9	
Transliteration	w	
Transcription	w	
IPA	[w]	
Position in rune-row	8	

Wynn in the Hildebrandslied manuscript (830s): the text reads ƿiges ƿarne.

Capital wynn in the opening lines of Beowulf. The text reads HǷÆT ǷE GARDENA...

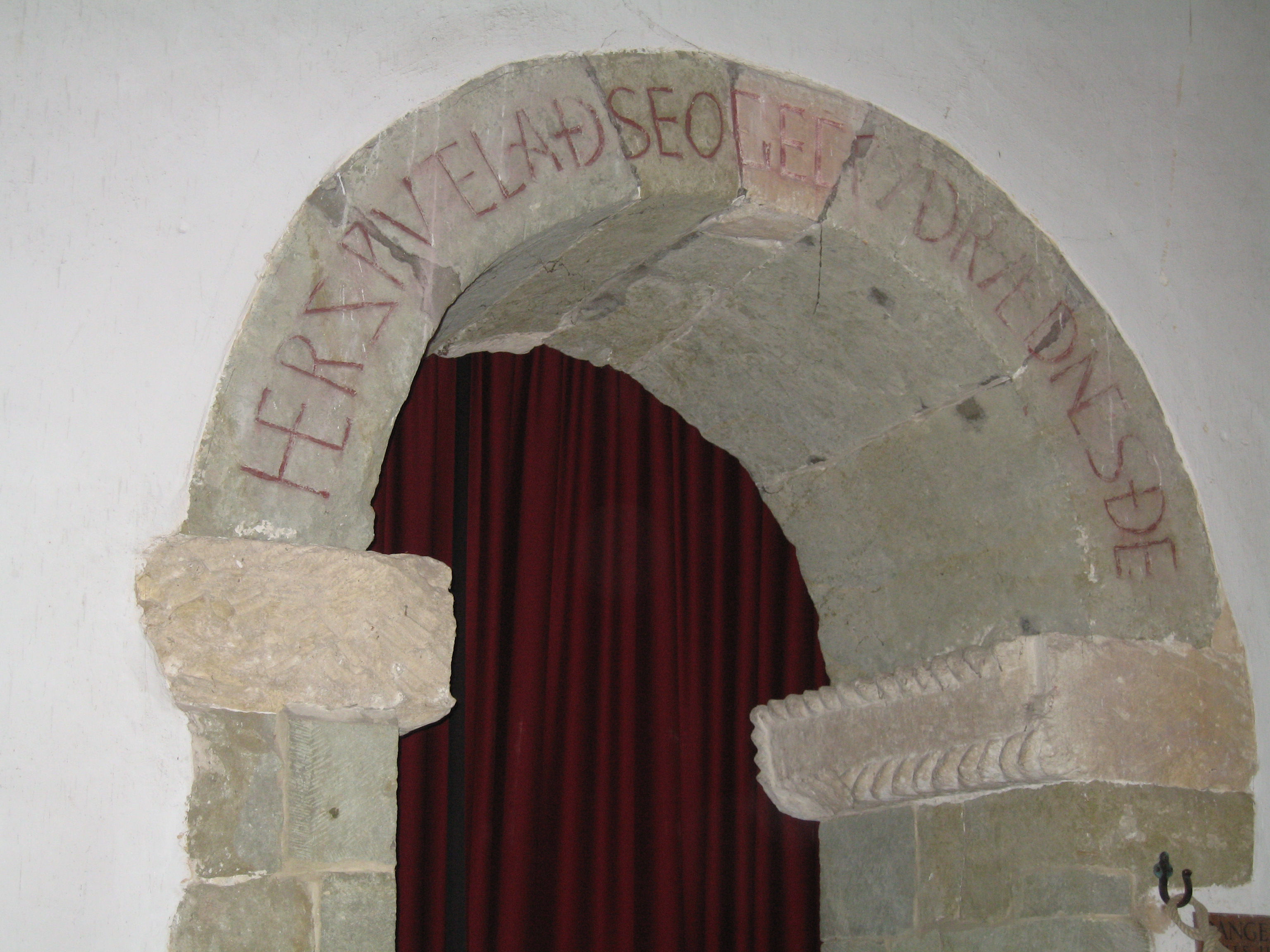
Capital wynn appears twice in this 10th century inscription in Breamore: her sƿutelað seo gecƿydrædnes ðe (Here is manifested the Word to thee).

Wynn, or wyn (Ƿ ƿ; also spelled wen, win, ƿynn, ƿyn, ƿen, and ƿin), is a letter of the Old English alphabet, where it is used to represent the sound /w/. It was a continued use of the Anglo-Frisian Futhorc runes. Futhorc was the native alphabet of Old English before the Latin alphabet was adopted, and it was a sibling alphabet to the Younger Futhark alphabet that Old Norse used. Both alphabets come from Elder Futhark.

== History ==
=== The letter "W" ===
While the earliest Old English texts represent this phoneme with the digraph ⟨uu⟩ or ⟨vv⟩, scribes soon revived the rune wynn ᚹ from Old English's native alphabet, Anglo-Frisian Futhorc, for this purpose. It remained a standard letter throughout the Anglo-Saxon era, eventually falling out of use during the Middle English period, circa 1300. In Middle English texts, it was sometimes replaced with ⟨u⟩ or with a ligature form of ⟨uu⟩, until it was replaced with the modern letter ⟨w⟩.

=== Meaning ===
The denotation of the rune is "joy, bliss", known from the Old English or Anglo-Saxon rune poem:

ᚹ Ƿenne brūceþ, þe can ƿēana lẏt
sāres and sorge and him sẏlfa hæf
blǣd and blẏsse and eac bẏrga geniht.

— Lines 22–24 in the Anglo-Saxon runic poem

Who uses it knows no pain,
sorrow nor anxiety, and he himself has
prosperity and bliss, and also enough shelter.

— Translation slightly modified from Dickins (1915)

== Unicode ==
The following wynn and wynn-related characters are in Unicode:

- U+01F7 Ƿ LATIN CAPITAL LETTER WYNN
- U+01BF ƿ LATIN LETTER WYNN
- U+16B9 ᚹ RUNIC LETTER WUNJO WYNN W
- U+A768 Ꝩ LATIN CAPITAL LETTER VEND
- U+A769 ꝩ LATIN SMALL LETTER VEND
- U+A7D4 ꟔ LATIN CAPITAL LETTER DOUBLE WYNN
- U+A7D5 ꟕ LATIN SMALL LETTER DOUBLE WYNN

== Computing codes ==
Character information
Preview	Ƿ		ƿ	
Unicode name	LATIN CAPITAL LETTER WYNN		LATIN LETTER WYNN	
Encodings	decimal	hex	dec	hex
Unicode	503	U+01F7	447	U+01BF
UTF-8	199 183	C7 B7	198 191	C6 BF
Numeric character reference	&#503;	&#x1F7;	&#447;	&#x1BF;

Capital wynn (left), lowercase wynn (right)

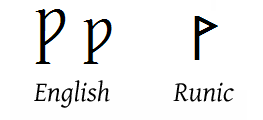
Difference between English Wynn (left), and Runic Wynn (right)

== See also ==
=== Other former letters ===
- Ampersand
- Ash
- Barred thorn
- Eng
- Eth
- Ethel
- Insular g
- Long s
- Tironian et
- Thorn
- Yogh

=== Miscellaneous ===
- Digamma
- Meldorf fibula
- Middle Welsh v
