= Vend (letter) =

Letter of written Old Norse

Ꝩ
- Ꝩ ꝩ
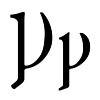

Usage
- Writing system: Latin script
- Type: Alphabetic and Logographic
- Language of origin: Old Norse language
- Sound values: [u]; [v]; [w]
- In Unicode: U+A768, U+A769

History
- Development: ᚹ: Ƿ ƿ; Ꝩ ꝩ
- Time period: ~1100 to ~1200
- Descendants: None
- Sisters: Ƿ ƿ
- Transliterations: u, v, w

Other
- Associated graphs: u, v, w
- Writing direction: Left-to-right

Vend (Ꝩ, ꝩ) is a letter of Old Norse. It was used to represent the sounds /u/, /v/, and /w/.

It was related to and probably derived from the Old English letter Wynn of the Runic alphabet (ᚹ) and later the Latin alphabet (Ƿ ƿ), except that the bowl was open on the top, not being connected to the stem, which made it somewhat resemble a letter Y. It was eventually replaced with v or u for most writings.

== Character encoding ==
The upper and lowercase Vend were standardized in April 2008 with the release of Unicode 5.1, as part of the Latin Extended-D block.

Character information
| Preview | Ꝩ | | ꝩ | |
|---|---|---|---|---|
| Unicode name | LATIN CAPITAL LETTER VEND | | LATIN SMALL LETTER VEND | |
| Encodings | decimal | hex | dec | hex |
| Unicode | 42856 | U+A768 | 42857 | U+A769 |
| UTF-8 | 234 157 168 | EA 9D A8 | 234 157 169 | EA 9D A9 |
| Numeric character reference | &#42856; | &#xA768; | &#42857; | &#xA769; |
