= Icelandic keyboard layout =

Icelandic-language keyboard layout

Icelandic keyboard layout

The Icelandic keyboard layout is a national functional keyboard layout described in ÍST 125, used to write the Icelandic language on computers and typewriters. It is QWERTY-based and features some influences from the continental Nordic layouts. It supports the language's many special letters, some of which it shares with the other Nordic languages:

- Þ/þ, Ð/ð, Æ/æ and Ö/ö (Æ/æ also occurs in Norwegian, Danish and Faroese, Ð/ð in Faroese, and Ö/ö in Swedish, Finnish and Estonian.) These are all entered by pressing dedicated keys Þ Ð Æ Ö.
- Á/á, É/é, Ý/ý, Ú/ú, Í/í, and Ó/ó are entered by first pressing dead key ´ located to the right of Æ and then the corresponding key.

== Non-Icelandic letters ==
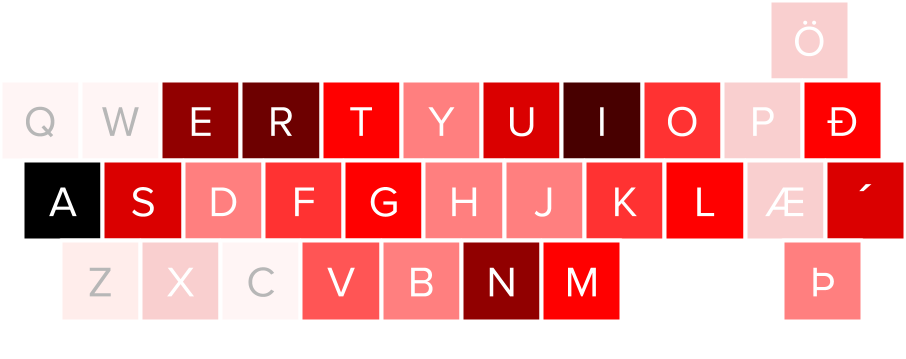
Letter frequency in Icelandic

The letters Å/å, Ä/ä, Ÿ/ÿ, Ü/ü, Ï/ï, and Ë/ë can be produced with the Icelandic keyboard by first pressing the ° or ⇧ Shift+° (for ¨) dead key located below the Esc key, and then the corresponding letter (i.e. ° followed by A yields å). These letters are not used natively in Icelandic, but may have been implemented for ease of communication in other Nordic languages.
