= Breviograph =

Type of abbreviation

A breviograph or brevigraph (from Latin: brevis, 'short', and Greek grapho, 'to write') is a type of scribal abbreviation in the form of an easily written symbol, character, flourish or stroke, based on a modified letter form to take the place of a common letter combination, especially those occurring at the beginning or end of a word. Breviographs were used frequently by stenographers, law clerks and scriveners, and they were also found in early printed books and tracts. Their use declined after the 17th century.

== Examples ==
Examples of breviographs:

- & — et (e.g. &c = etc)
- ⋅i⋅ — id est
- ꝑ — per-, pre-, or par- (e.g. ꝑson = person)
- ß — ser-, sur-, or sir- (e.g. ßuaunt = seruaunt = servant)
- X — Christ- (e.g. Xian = Christian)

== See also ==
- Acronym and initialism
- Palaeography
- Tironian notes
- Classical abbreviations
- Medieval abbreviations
- Scribal abbreviations

== Sources ==
- Whitaker, Elaine E. (November 1992). "Lacunae and the id est Brevigraph in Oxford, Bodleian Library, MS Bodley 283". Manuscripta. 36 (3): 191–199. doi:10.1484/j.mss.3.1414.
