= Olav Jakobsen Høyem =

Olav Jakobsen Høyem (1830–1899) was a Norwegian teacher, telegrapher, supervisor of banknote printing and linguist. He was born in Byneset outside Trondheim in Søndre Trondhjem county. His father was Jakob Høyem and his mother Karen Olsdatter Prestegaard Høyem. As a linguist, he fought for a Nynorsk written normal which was more consistent with Trøndersk than Ivar Aasen's version was. One notable thing is that he etymologically employed the Old Norse character ð as a silent letter in e.g. með [meː], preposition 'with', from Old Norse með, which was spelled med in Ivar Aasen's normal. He also preferred to use a endings where Ivar Aasen's normal has i, e.g. sola noun 'the sun' instead of soli.
