= Icelandic Encyclopedia A–Ö =

1990 Icelandic-language encyclopedia

The Icelandic Encyclopedia A–Ö is an encyclopedia in the Icelandic language published in 1990 by Örn og Örlygur. The book is in three volumes, containing about 37,000 tags and 4,500 drawings and maps, and is also the first Icelandic encyclopedia. The editors were Dóra Hafsteinsdóttir and Sigríður Harðardóttir. Another printing came out in 1992.
