= Thorn (letter) =

Letter of Old English and some Scandinavian languages

Þ
- Þ þ

Usage
- Writing system: Adapted from Futhark and Futhorc into Latin script
- Type: Alphabetic and logographic
- Language of origin: Old English language Old Norse language
- Sound values: [θ]; [ð]; [θ̠]; [ð̠]; [tʰ]; [z]
- In Unicode: U+00DE, U+00FE

History
- Development: ᚦ: Þ þ
- Time period: ~800 to present
- Descendants: Ꝥ ꝥ, Ꝧ ꝧ, ꟒ ꟓ
- Sisters: None
- Transliterations: Θ, th

Other
- Associated graphs: th, dh
- Writing direction: Left-to-right

Þ (minuscule: þ), called thorn or þorn (/θɔːrn/ thorn), is a Latin-script letter used in the Old English, Old Norse, Old Swedish and modern Icelandic alphabets, as well as modern transliterations of the Gothic alphabet, Middle Scots, and some dialects of Middle English. It was also used in medieval Scandinavia but, except in Iceland (where it still survives), it was later replaced with the digraph th. The letter originated from the rune ᚦ (Thurisaz) in the Elder Futhark and was called thorn in the Anglo-Saxon and thorn or thurs in the Scandinavian rune poems. It is similar in appearance to the archaic Greek letter sho (ϸ), although the two are historically unrelated. The only language in which þ is currently in use is Icelandic.

It represented a voiceless dental fricative [θ] or its voiced counterpart [ð]. However, in modern Icelandic, it represents a laminal voiceless alveolar non-sibilant fricative [θ̠], similar to th as in the English word thick, or a (usually apical) voiced alveolar non-sibilant fricative [ð̠], similar to th as in the English word the. Modern Icelandic usage generally excludes the latter, which is instead represented with the letter eth ⟨Ð, ð⟩; however, [ð̠] may occur as an allophone of /θ̠/, and written ⟨þ⟩, when it appears in an unstressed pronoun or adverb after a voiced sound.

In typography, the lowercase character is unusual for it has an ascender and a descender. (Note: Other examples are the lowercase Cyrillic ф, and, in some fonts, especially in italic, the Latin letters f and ſ.)

== Uses ==
=== English ===
==== Old English ====
The letter thorn was used in Old English very early on, as was eth (ð, which was called eð). Unlike eth which dwindled quickly, thorn gradually dwindled in the Middle English so as to become limited to few works in Early Modern English. Both letters were used for the phoneme /θ/, sometimes by the same scribe. This sound was regularly realised in Old English as the voiced fricative [ð] between voiced sounds, but either letter could be used to write it; the modern use of [ð] in phonetic alphabets is not the same as the Old English orthographic use. A thorn with the ascender crossed (Ꝥ) was a popular abbreviation for the word that.

==== Middle and Early Modern English ====
"... hir the grace that god put ..." (Extract from The Book of Margery Kempe)

The modern digraph th appears in the 12th century (within England) and begins to take over towards the end of Middle English orthography; during which transition, the shape of ⟨Þ⟩ grew less distinctive, with the letter losing its ascender (becoming similar in appearance to the old wynn (⟨Ƿ⟩, ⟨ƿ⟩), which had fallen out of use by 1300, and to ancient through modern ⟨P⟩, ⟨p⟩). By this stage, th was predominant and the use of ⟨Þ⟩ was largely restricted to certain common words and abbreviations. This was the longest-lived use, though with the arrival of movable type printing, the substitution of ⟨y⟩ for ⟨Þ⟩ became part of the repertoire of some notable artisans and printers such as its use very occasionally in the first mass-produced English bible and its appearance in stonemasonry on the grave of William Shakespeare. The letter, whenever it could have been interchanged with th, was never pronounced /j/, as in the word ⟨yes⟩. The first printing of the King James Version of the Bible in 1611 used y^{e} for "the" occasionally such as Job 1:9, John 15:1, and Romans 15:29. It also used y^{t} as an abbreviation for "that", in places such as 2 Corinthians 13:7. All were replaced in later printings by the or that, respectively.

==== Abbreviations in Middle and Early Modern English ====
ꝥ, þͤ, yͤ

The following were scribal abbreviations during Middle and Early Modern English using the letter thorn:

- ꝥ – The thorn with stroke (or barred thorn) is an early manuscript abbreviation inherited from Old English. It is the letter ⟨þ⟩, with a bold horizontal stroke through the ascender, and it represents the word þæt, meaning "the" or "that" (neuter nom. / acc.). The letter ꝧ, a thorn with stroke through the descender, denotes the word þurh, meaning "through."
- þͤ – a Middle English abbreviation for the word the
- þͭ – a Middle English abbreviation for the word that
- þͧ – a rare Middle English abbreviation for the word thou (which was written early on as þu or þou)
- yᷤ – an Early Modern English abbreviation for the word this
- yͤ – an Early Modern English abbreviation for the word the
- yͭ – an Early Modern English abbreviation for the word that
- yͧ – an Early Modern English abbreviation for the word thou

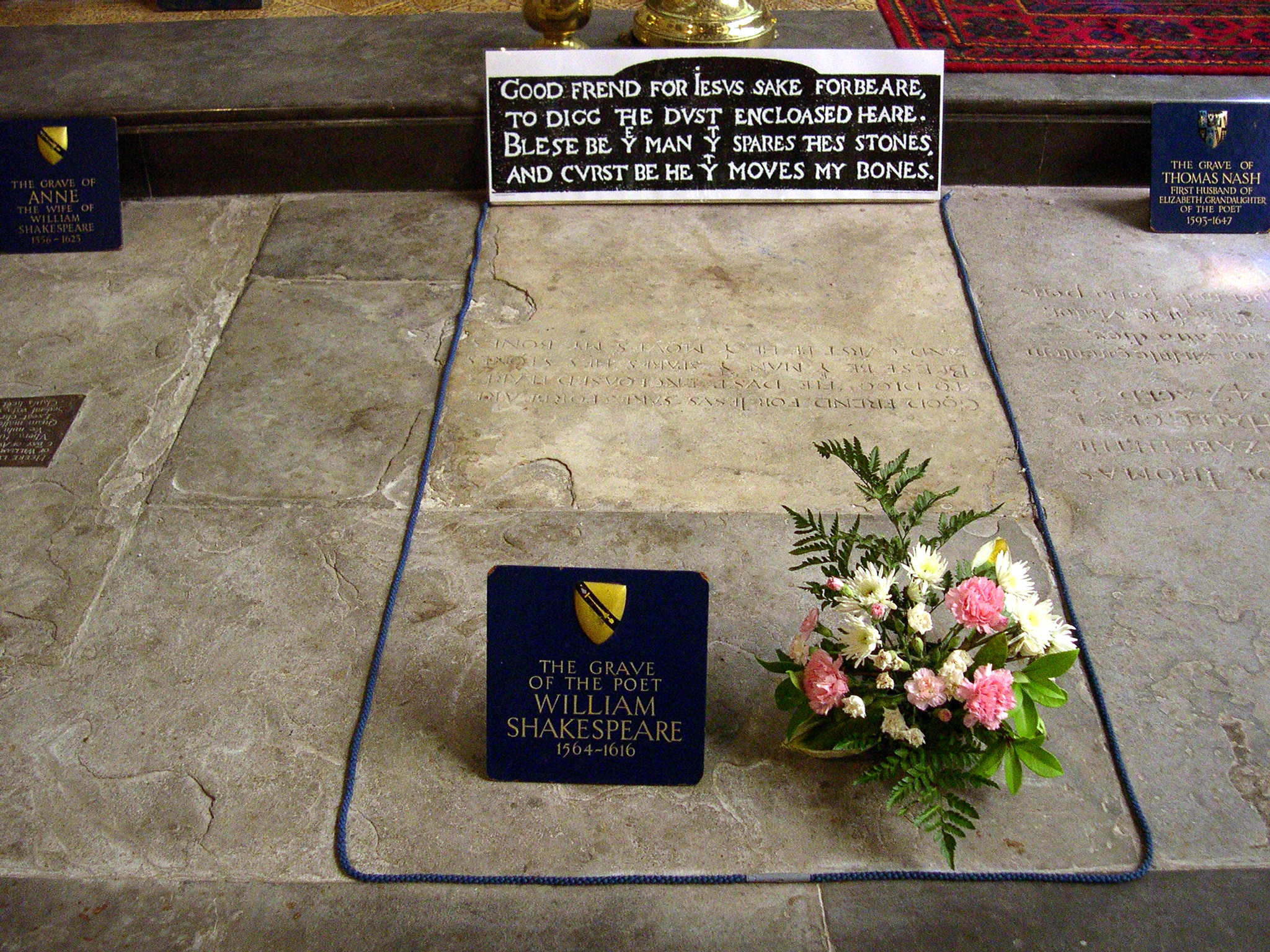
The epitaph on the grave of William Shakespeare includes scribal abbreviations of the and that.

==== Modern English ====
Thorn in the form of a "Y" survives in pseudo-archaic uses, particularly the stock prefix phrase "ye olde". The definite article Þe (The), spelt with "Y" rather than a thorn (as ye), is often jocularly or mistakenly pronounced /jiː/ ("yee"), conflating it with the archaic nominative case of the second person plural pronoun, "ye", as in "Ye are many".

=== Icelandic ===
Icelandic is the only living language to keep the letter thorn. In Icelandic, þ is pronounced þoddn, [θ̠ɔtn̥] or þorn [θ̠ɔrn̥]. The letter is the 30th in the Icelandic alphabet, modelled after Old Norse alphabet in the 19th century; it is transliterated to th when it cannot be reproduced and never appears at the end of a word. For example, the name of Hafþór Júlíus Björnsson is anglicised as Hafthor.

Its pronunciation has not varied much, but before the introduction of the eth character, þ was used to represent the sound [ð], as in the word "verþa", which is now spelt verða (meaning "to become") in modern Icelandic or normalized orthography. Þ was originally taken from the runic alphabet and is described in the First Grammatical Treatise from the 12th-century:

Staf þann er flestir menn kalla þ, þann kalla ég af því heldur þe að þá er það atkvæði hans í hverju máli sem eftir lifir nafnsins er úr er tekinn raddarstafur úr nafni hans, sem alla hefi ég samhljóðendur samda í það mark nú sem ég reit snemma í þeirra umræðu. [...] Höfuðstaf þe-sins rita ég hvergi nema í vers upphafi því að hans atkvæði má eigi æxla þótt hann standi eftir raddarstaf í samstöfun. – First Grammarian, First Grammatical Treatise	The letter which most men call thorn I shall call the, so that its sound value in each context will be what is left of the name when the vowel is removed, since I have now arranged all the consonants in that manner, as I wrote earlier in this discussion. [...] The capital letter of the I do not write except at the beginning of a section, since its sound cannot be extended, even when it follows the vowel of the syllable. – First Grammarian, First Grammatical Treatise, translation by Einar Haugen

Upper- and lowercase versions of the thorn character, in sans-serif (left) and serif (right)

=== Albanian ===
The letter thorn was used to represent the voiceless dental fricative (/θ/) in the historic Agimi alphabet, which provided a one-letter-per-sound alternative to the various scripts used for the Albanian language at the time. Several magazines and books were published using this alphabet from 1901 to 1908, when a unified Albanian alphabet was adopted at the Congress of Manastir.

== Unicode ==
Uppercase and lowercase forms of thorn have Unicode encodings:

- U+00DE Þ LATIN CAPITAL LETTER THORN (&THORN;)
- U+00FE þ LATIN SMALL LETTER THORN (&thorn;)

These Unicode codepoints were inherited from ISO/IEC 8859-1 ("ISO Latin-1") encoding.

=== Variants ===
Various forms of thorn were used for medieval scribal abbreviations:

- U+A764 Ꝥ LATIN CAPITAL LETTER THORN WITH STROKE
- U+A765 ꝥ LATIN SMALL LETTER THORN WITH STROKE
- U+A766 Ꝧ LATIN CAPITAL LETTER THORN WITH STROKE THROUGH DESCENDER
- U+A767 ꝧ LATIN SMALL LETTER THORN WITH STROKE THROUGH DESCENDER
- U+A7D2 ꟒ LATIN CAPITAL LETTER DOUBLE THORN
- U+A7D3 ꟓ LATIN SMALL LETTER DOUBLE THORN

=== Ligatures ===
There are no precomposed characters for ligatures like þͤ. These may be created using Unicode's combining character facility, for example U+0364 ◌ͤ COMBINING LATIN SMALL LETTER E or U+036D ◌ͭ COMBINING LATIN SMALL LETTER T.

== See also ==
- Eth, Ð, another Old English and Icelandic letter
- Icelandic keyboard layout – Icelandic-language keyboard layout
- Pronunciation of English ⟨th⟩
- Sho (letter), Ϸ, a similar letter in the Greek alphabet used to write the Bactrian language
- Yogh, Ȝ, a letter used in Middle English and Older Scots
- Wynn, Ƿ, another runic letter used in Old English
- Unicode input – Input characters using their Unicode code points

== Bibliography ==
- Freeborn, Dennis (1992) From Old English to Standard English. London: Macmillan
- Ladefoged, Peter; Maddieson, Ian (1996). The Sounds of the World's Languages. Oxford: Blackwell. ISBN 0-631-19815-6.
- Pétursson, Magnus (1971), "Étude de la réalisation des consonnes islandaises þ, ð, s, dans la prononciation d'un sujet islandais à partir de la radiocinématographie", Phonetica, 33 (4): 203–216, doi:10.1159/000259344, S2CID 145316121
