= Hjörsey =

Island in Iceland

Native name: Hjörsey
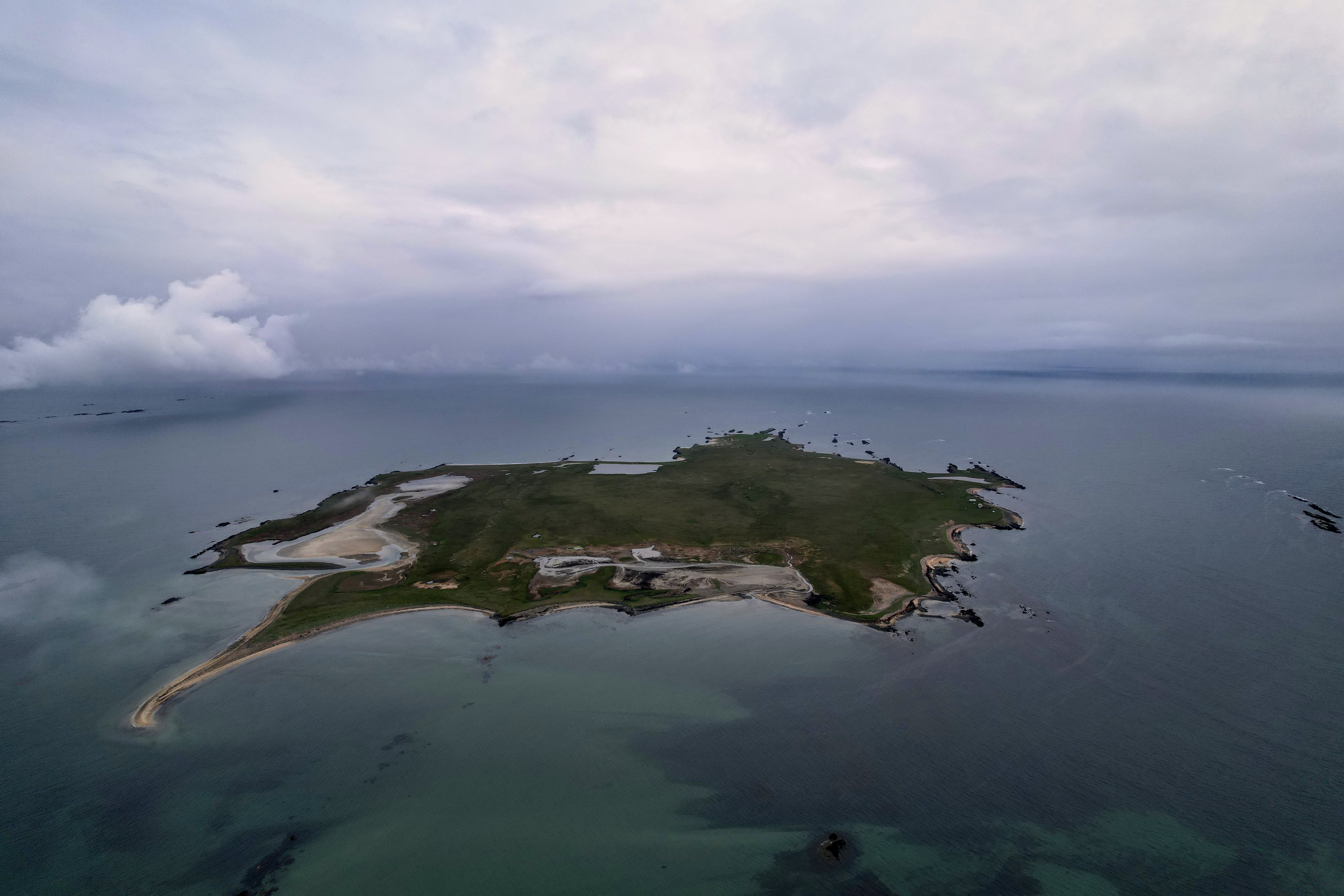

- Location within Iceland

Geography
- Location: Atlantic Ocean
- Coordinates: 64°31′36.52″N 22°20′58.74″W
- Area: 5.5 km^{2} (2.1 sq mi)
- Length: 10.98 km (6.823 mi)

Administration
- Iceland
- Constituency: Norðvesturkjördæmi
- Region: Vesturland
- Capital and largest city: Reykjavík
- President: Guðni Th. Jóhannesson
- Area covered: 102,775 km^{2} (39,682 sq mi; 1868636.4%)

Additional information
- Time zone: IST (UTC+0)

Hjörsey (Icelandic pronunciation: [ˈçœr̥sˌeiː]) is the largest island in western Iceland and the third largest in Iceland. It was part of the traditional county of Mýrasýsla; there used to be a church on Hjörsey, but it was taken apart in 1896. The island was also formerly home to a farm. While there is no human population on the island, a herd of wild horses is able to roam the island freely.
