= First Grammatical Treatise =

12th-century work on Old Norse phonology

The First Grammatical Treatise (Icelandic: Fyrsta málfræðiritgerðin (Note: Icelandic pronunciation: [ˈfɪ(r̥)sta ˈmauːlˌfraiːðɪˌrɪːtˌcɛrðɪn]. The title is conventional and was established by Icelandic scholarship in the modern period; the original Old Norse text does not have a title.)) is a 12th-century work on the phonology of the Old Norse or Old Icelandic language. It was given this name because it is the first of four grammatical works bound in the Icelandic manuscript Codex Wormianus. The anonymous author is today often referred to as the "First Grammarian".

== Significance ==
This work is one of the earliest written works in Icelandic (and in any North Germanic language). It is a linguistic work dealing with Old Norse, in the tradition of Latin and Greek grammatical treatises, generally dated to the mid-12th century. Hreinn Benediktsson was not able to narrow the time of writing more precisely than to 1125–1175.

The First Grammatical Treatise is of great interest to the history of linguistics, since it systematically used the technique of minimal pairs to establish the inventory of distinctive sounds or phonemes in the Icelandic language, in a manner reminiscent of the methods of structural linguistics. It is also notable for revealing the existence of a whole series of nasal vowel phonemes, whose presence in the Icelandic language of the time would otherwise be unknown.

The Treatise was an unsuccessful experiment in standardisation, rather than a descriptive account of existing usage, aimed at establishing norms for writing the vernacular. According to linguist Karl G. Johansson, the proposed system may have functioned locally for a generation or two, but did not persist.

The Treatise is important for the study of Old Norse, as it is a major text showing the state of the language just prior to the writing of the Icelandic Sagas. It also provides a comprehensive study of the pronunciation of the language. It proposed an Icelandic alphabet derived from the Latin, and more adapted to writing on paper or parchment than the older, epigraphic Runic alphabet that was made for shorter carvings on wood or stone. (Other writings in the Latin alphabet presumably existed in the form of law books and Christian writings. The educated clergy of the time would not have used runes.) This alphabet included þ (derived straight from the runes), as well as diacritic indication of vowel length, and an o with an ogonek. The First Grammarian's entire system was never adopted, as evidenced in later manuscripts, in some cases not much younger, but it has had an influence on Icelandic writing ever since (see above). See Icelandic orthography.

== Alphabet ==
The author of the First Grammatical Treatise proposes that long vowels be marked with an acute accent, e.g. á. The nasal vowels are marked with a dot. (Note: First Grammatical Treatise: "far, fár; rȧmr, rámr") Small capitals denote a geminate consonant. The author proposes a letter ꞡ (g with a stroke through the loop), named eng ("meadow"), which denotes /ŋ/, /nɡ/.

Vowels (Raddarstafir, "reard (sound) staves"): a, ȧ, ǫ, ǫ̇, e, ė, ę, ę̇, ı, i, o, ȯ, ø, ø̇, u, u̇, y, ẏ

Consonants (Samhljóðendr, "co-sound (consonance) ends"): b, ʙ, c, ᴋ, d, ᴅ, f, ꜰ, g, ɢ, ꞡ, h, l, ʟ, m, ᴍ, n, ɴ, p, ᴘ, r, ʀ, ſ, ꜱ, t, ᴛ, þ

Note: "c" is lowercase; lowercase long-s "ſ" is followed by small-capital "ꜱ".

Samsettar (Letters for composite sounds): x, z

Other: ⁊, ˜

== Phonological System ==
Based on the description of minimal pairs of words in Old Norse, Einar Haugen proposes one tentative interpretation of the vowel description given by the First Grammatical Treatise. There are potentially 36 vowels in Old Norse, with 9 basic vowel qualities, /i, y, e, ø, ɛ, u, o, ɔ, a/, which are further distinguished by length and nasality. Haugen notes that "A system of thirty-six vowel phonemes would have been something of a monstrosity among the world's phonemic systems". However, a system of 18 oral vowels is in no way unusual for a Germanic language, and nasality must be seen an independent category.

Potential Vowel Inventory of Old Norse
	Front vowels				Back vowels			
	Unrounded		Rounded		Unrounded		Rounded	
Close	i • ĩ	iː • ĩː	y • ỹ	yː • ỹː			u • ũ	uː • ũː
Mid	e • ẽ	eː • ẽː	ø • ø̃	øː • ø̃ː			o • õ	oː • õː
Open, open-mid	ɛ • ɛ̃	ɛː • ɛ̃ː			a • ã	aː • ãː	ɔ • ɔ̃	ɔː • ɔ̃ː

== The author ==
The author is unknown, and is usually referred to as "First Grammarian". Scholars have hypothesized various identities for the First Grammarian. He was possibly active in the Benedictine milieu, most likely connected with the monastery of Þingeyrar in the northern part of Iceland. One probable candidate is Hallr Teitsson (born ca. 1085, died 1150). Þóroddr Gamlason has also been suggested.

Haugen notes that the author of the text cannot be the 11th century Icelandic scholar Ari the Learned (1067-1148), as the author refers to Ari, "in the text with a reverence such as might be offered by a pupil or a friend." Furthermore, Haugen notes, concerning the author candidate Hallr Teitsson, that, "His [Hallr's] father was a foster brother of Ari the Learned, and Hallr himself was the fourth in line of a distinguished family of cultural leaders in Iceland".

The First Grammarian's choice of terminology, such as the use of the Latin terms "capitulum" and "vers", as well as a quotation from Cato's Distichs, suggests he received a Latin education. However, he was also well-versed and familiar with Norse skaldic poetic verse, making him "one of that line of students of poetics, whose greatest representative from Iceland was to be Snorri Sturluson." This can be seen in the illustrative sentences used in demonstrating minimal pairs, which contain allusions to "the giantess Þórgerð Hǫlgabrúð (90.20), Thor and the giant Hymir (90.20), and the legendary Dane Ubbi (90.19)".
