= Thorn with stroke =

Letter of the Latin alphabet

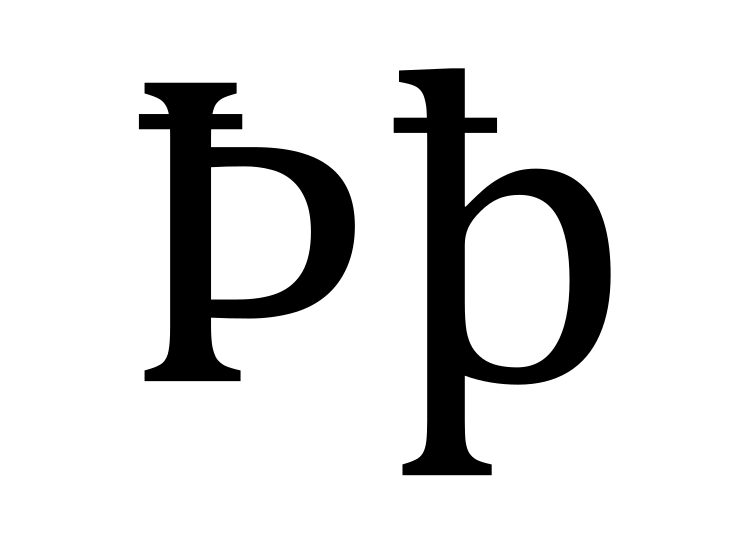
⟨Ꝥ ꝥ⟩

Ꝥ (minuscule: ꝥ), or Þ (thorn) with stroke was a scribal abbreviation common in the Middle Ages. It was used for Old English: þæt (Modern English "that"), as well as Old Norse: þor-, the -þan/-ðan in síðan, þat, þæt, and þess. In Old English texts, the stroke tended to be more slanted, while in Old Norse texts it was straight. In Middle English times, the ascender of the þ was reduced (making it similar to the Old English letter Wynn (ƿ), which caused the thorn with stroke abbreviation ( ) to be replaced with a thorn with a small t above the letter ( ).

Unicode encodes Ꝥ as U+A764 Ꝥ LATIN CAPITAL LETTER THORN WITH STROKE, and ꝥ at U+A765 ꝥ LATIN SMALL LETTER THORN WITH STROKE.

A thorn with a stroke on the descender also exists, used historically as an abbreviation for the word "through". The codepoints are U+A766 Ꝧ LATIN CAPITAL LETTER THORN WITH STROKE THROUGH DESCENDER, and U+A767 ꝧ LATIN SMALL LETTER THORN WITH STROKE THROUGH DESCENDER.
