= Eth =

Latin-script letter (Ð ð)

Ð
- Ð ð

Usage
- Writing system: Latin script
- Type: Alphabetic and logographic
- Language of origin: Old English; Old Norse
- Sound values: [ð] [θ] [ð̠] /ɛð/
- In Unicode: U+00D0, U+00F0

History
Development
K1K2O31
      - Δ δ
        - 𐌃 d
          - D d
            - Ꝺ ꝺ
              - Ð ð
- Time period: ~800 to present
- Sisters: د 𐡃 ד ܕ ࠃ 𐤃 𐩵 ደ 𐎄
- Transliterations: d

Other
- Associated graphs: th, dh
- Writing direction: Left-to-Right

Eth in Arial and Times New Roman

Ð (minuscule: ð), known as eth or edh, (Note: Also called eð.) is a Latin-script letter. It is present in the Old English, Middle English, Icelandic, Faroese (in which it is called edd), and Elfdalian alphabets.

It was also used in Scandinavia during the Middle Ages, but was subsequently replaced with ⟨dh⟩, and later ⟨d⟩.

It is often transliterated as ⟨d⟩.

The lowercase version has been adopted to represent a voiced dental fricative (IPA: [ð]) in the International Phonetic Alphabet.

== Faroese ==
In Faroese, ⟨ð⟩ is not assigned to any particular phoneme and appears mostly for etymological reasons, but it indicates most glides. When ⟨ð⟩ appears before ⟨r⟩, it is in a few words pronounced [ɡ]. In the Faroese alphabet, ⟨ð⟩ follows ⟨d⟩.

== Khmer ==
⟨Ð⟩ is sometimes used in Khmer romanization to represent ឍ thô.

== Icelandic ==
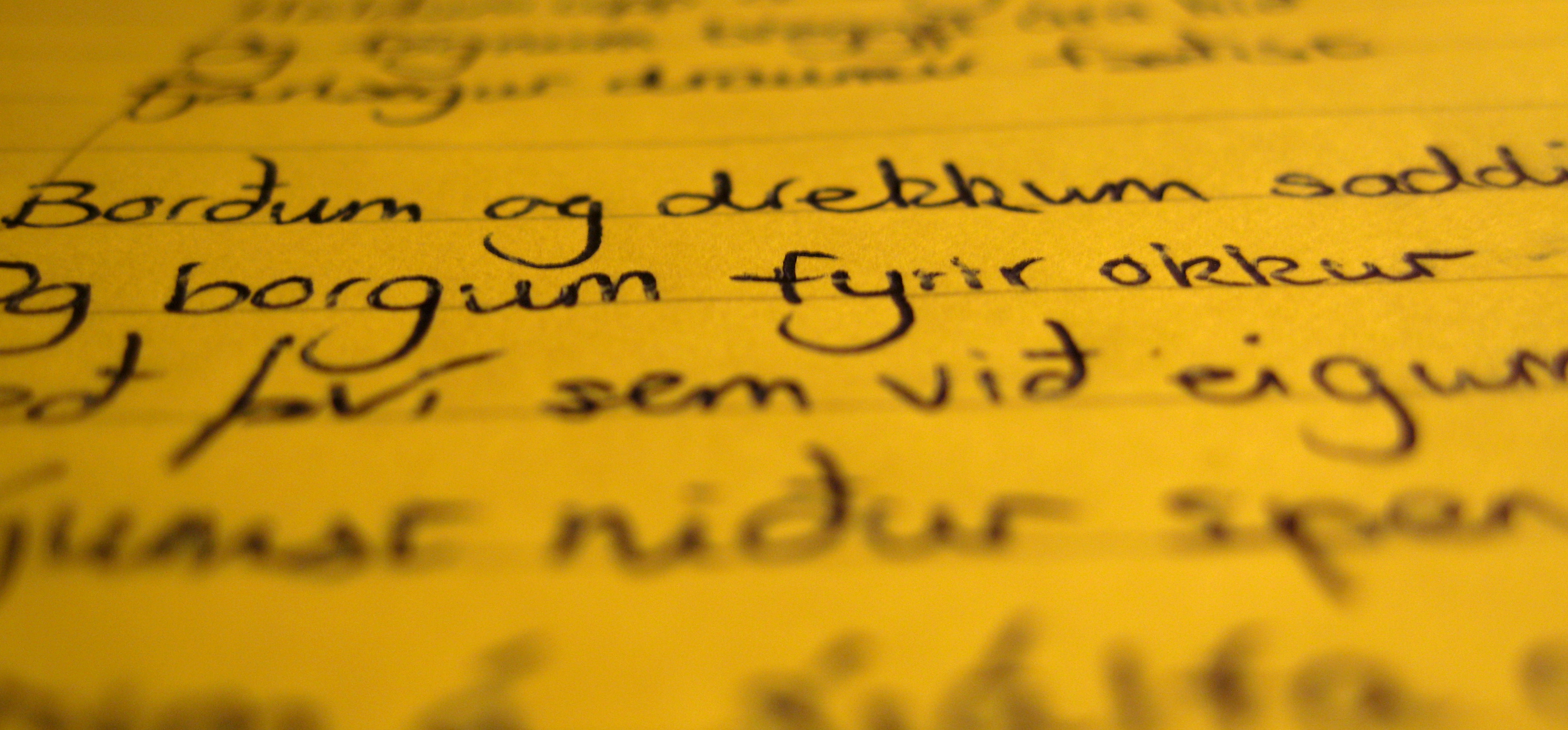
A sample of Icelandic handwriting with some instances of lowercase ð clearly visible: in the words Borðum, við and niður. Also visible is a thorn in the word því.

In Icelandic, ⟨ð⟩, called "eð", represents an alveolar non-sibilant fricative, voiced [ð̠] intervocalically and word-finally, and voiceless [θ̠] otherwise. In the Icelandic alphabet, ⟨ð⟩ follows ⟨d⟩.

== Norwegian ==
In Olav Jakobsen Høyem's version of Nynorsk based on Trøndersk, ⟨ð⟩ was always silent, and was introduced for etymological reasons.

== Old English ==
In Old English, ⟨ð⟩ was used interchangeably with ⟨þ⟩ to represent the Old English dental fricative phoneme /θ/ or its allophone [ð], which exist in modern English as the voiceless and voiced dental fricatives both now spelled ⟨th⟩.

Scholars disagree on what the Anglo-Saxons would have called this letter. A leading scholar of 1957 argues that BM M.S. Stowe 57 provides ðæt as the native Old English letter name. Two such scholars of 1990 however write that it "seems equally likely that [...] the ð was intended as an abbreviation for the word ðaet rather than the name of the letter."

Unlike the runic letter ⟨þ⟩, ⟨ð⟩ is a modified Roman letter. Neither ⟨ð⟩ nor ⟨þ⟩ was found in the earliest records of Old English. A study of Mercian royal diplomas found that ⟨ð⟩ began to emerge in the early 8th century, with ⟨ð⟩ becoming strongly preferred by the 780s. Another source indicates that the letter is "derived from Irish writing".

Under the reign of King Alfred the Great, ⟨þ⟩ grew greatly in popularity and started to overtake ⟨ð⟩, and did so completely by the Middle English period. ⟨þ⟩ in turn became obsolete by the Early Modern English period, mostly due to the rise of the printing press, and was replaced by the digraph ⟨th⟩.

== Welsh ==
⟨Ð⟩ has also been used by some in written Welsh to represent /ð/, which is normally represented as ⟨dd⟩.

== Phonetic transcription ==
- /ð/ (U+00F0) represents a voiced dental fricative in the International Phonetic Alphabet.
- /ᶞ/ (U+1D9E) is used in phonetic transcription.
- ᴆ (U+1D06) is used in the Uralic Phonetic Alphabet.

== Computer encoding ==
Upper and lower case forms of eth have Unicode encodings:

- U+00D0 Ð LATIN CAPITAL LETTER ETH (&ETH;)
- U+00F0 ð LATIN SMALL LETTER ETH (&eth;)

These Unicode codepoints were inherited from ISO/IEC 8859-1 ("ISO Latin-1") encoding.

== Modern uses ==
- A capital eth is used as the currency symbol for Dogecoin, a cryptocurrency.

== See also ==
- African D – Variant of the Latin letter D used in African alphabets
- D
- D with stroke – Variant of the letter D
- Insular script – Medieval writing system common to Ireland and England
- T
- Thorn – Letter of Old English and some Scandinavian languages
