= Currency Symbols (Unicode block) =

- Range: U+20A0..U+20CF (48 code points)
- Plane: BMP
- Scripts: Common
- Symbol sets: Currency signs
- Assigned: 37 code points
- Unused: 11 reserved code points

Unicode Version History
- 1.0.0 (1991): 11 (+11)
- 2.0 (1996): 12 (+1)
- 2.1 (1998): 13 (+1)
- 3.0 (1999): 16 (+3)
- 3.2 (2002): 18 (+2)
- 4.1 (2005): 22 (+4)
- 5.2 (2009): 25 (+3)
- 6.0 (2010): 26 (+1)
- 6.2 (2012): 27 (+1)
- 7.0 (2014): 30 (+3)
- 8.0 (2015): 31 (+1)
- 10.0 (2017): 32 (+1)
- 14.0 (2021): 33 (+1)
- 17.0 (2025): 34 (+1)
- 18.0 (2026): 37 (+3)

Unicode documentation
- Code chart ∣ Web page

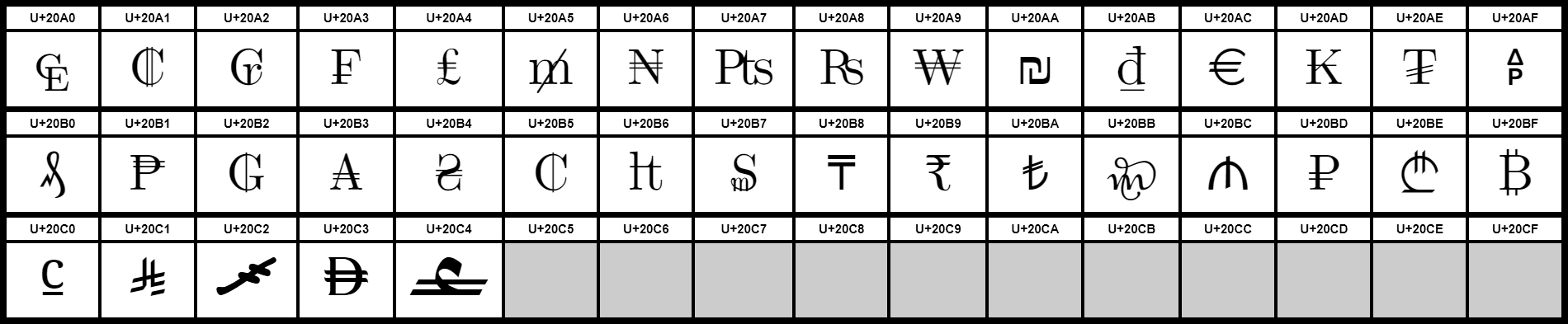
Graphical representation of the Currency Symbols Unicode block

Currency Symbols is a Unicode block containing characters for representing unique monetary signs. Many currency signs can be found in other Unicode blocks, especially when the currency symbol is unique to a country that uses a script not generally used outside that country.

The display of Unicode currency symbols among various typefaces is inconsistent, more so than other characters in the repertoire. The French franc sign (U+20A3) is typically displayed as a struck-through F, but alternate versions of the sign include an Fr ligature (as originally transcribed in the Unicode standard through version 2.0) and a double-struck through gamma. The peseta sign (U+20A7), inherited from code page 437, is usually displayed as a Pts ligature, but Roboto displays it as a Pt ligature and Arial Unicode MS displays it as a partially struck-through P. The rupee sign (U+20A8) is usually displayed as an Rs digraph, but Microsoft Sans Serif uses the quantity-neutral "Rp" digraph instead.

== Block ==
Currency Symbols^{[1]}^{[2]} Official Unicode Consortium code chart (PDF)
	0	1	2	3	4	5	6	7	8	9	A	B	C	D	E	F
U+20Ax	₠	₡	₢	₣	₤	₥	₦	₧	₨	₩	₪	₫	€	₭	₮	₯
U+20Bx	₰	₱	₲	₳	₴	₵	₶	₷	₸	₹	₺	₻	₼	₽	₾	₿
U+20Cx	⃀	⃁	⃂	⃃	⃄											
Notes 1.As of Unicode version 18.0 2.Grey areas indicate non-assigned code points

== History ==
The following Unicode-related documents record the purpose and process of defining specific characters in the Currency Symbols block:

Version	Final code points (Note: Proposed code points and characters names may differ from final code points and names)	Count	UTC ID	L2 ID	WG2 ID	Document
1.0.0	U+20A0..20AA	11				(to be determined)
1.0.0	U+20A0..20AA	11		L2/19-010		"Representative glyph for U+20A9 ₩ WON SIGN", Comments on Public Review Issues (Sept 14, 2018 - January 11, 2019), 2019-01-11
2.0	U+20AB	1			N1092R	Encoding the Vietnamese currency symbol in the BMP [UTC/1995-014], 1995-03-06
2.0	U+20AB	1			N1203	Umamaheswaran, V. S.; Ksar, Mike (1995-05-03), "6.1.2.1", Unconfirmed minutes of SC2/WG2 Meeting 27, Geneva
2.0	U+20AB	1	UTC/1995-xxx			"Proposal from TCVN/TCI on Vietnamese Currency Symbol Dong", Unicode Technical Committee Meeting #65, Minutes, 1995-06-02
2.0	U+20AB	1			N1232	Usage of Dong Symbol, 1995-06-20
2.0	U+20AB	1			N1315	Updated Table of replies and national body feedback on pDAM7 - Additional characters (SC2 N2656), 1996-01-09
2.0	U+20AB	1			N1539	Table of Replies and Feedback on Amendment 7 – Hebrew etc., 1997-01-29
2.0	U+20AB	1		L2/97-127	N1563	Paterson, Bruce (1997-05-27), Draft Report on JTC1 letter ballot on DAM No. 7 to ISO/IEC 10646-1 (33 additional characters)
2.0	U+20AB	1			N1572	Paterson, Bruce (1997-06-23), Almost Final Text – DAM 7 – 33 additional characters
2.0	U+20AB	1		L2/97-288	N1603	Umamaheswaran, V. S. (1997-10-24), "5.3.3", Unconfirmed Meeting Minutes, WG 2 Meeting # 33, Heraklion, Crete, Greece, 20 June – 4 July 1997
2.1	U+20AC	1			N1567	Ross, Hugh McGregor (1997-06-06), The Euro Currency Symbol
2.1	U+20AC	1		L2/97-081	N1566	Umamaheswaran, V. S. (1997-06-23), EURO in ISO 10646
2.1	U+20AC	1		L2/97-288	N1603	Umamaheswaran, V. S. (1997-10-24), "8.24.3", Unconfirmed Meeting Minutes, WG 2 Meeting # 33, Heraklion, Crete, Greece, 20 June – 4 July 1997
2.1	U+20AC	1		L2/98-004R	N1681	Text of ISO 10646 – AMD 18 for PDAM registration and FPDAM ballot, 1997-12-22
2.1	U+20AC	1		L2/98-318	N1894	Revised text of 10646-1/FPDAM 18, AMENDMENT 18: Symbols and Others, 1998-10-22
3.0	U+20AD	1		L2/98-061	N1720 (pdf, doc)	Umamaheswaran, V. S. (1998-02-27), KIP SIGN - Laotian Currency Sign
3.0	U+20AD	1		L2/98-070		Aliprand, Joan; Winkler, Arnold, "4.C.2", Minutes of the joint UTC and L2 meeting from the meeting in Cupertino, February 25-27, 1998
3.0	U+20AD	1		L2/98-286	N1703	Umamaheswaran, V. S.; Ksar, Mike (1998-07-02), "8.15", Unconfirmed Meeting Minutes, WG 2 Meeting #34, Redmond, WA, USA; 1998-03-16--20
3.0	U+20AD	1		L2/98-321	N1905	Revised text of 10646-1/FPDAM 23, AMENDMENT 23: Bopomofo Extended and other characters, 1998-10-22
3.0	U+20AE	1		L2/98-360	N1857	Sato, T. K. (1998-08-15), Addition of Tugrik sign on ISO/IEC 10646-1
3.0	U+20AE	1		L2/98-372	N1884R2 (pdf, doc)	Whistler, Ken; et al. (1998-09-22), Additional Characters for the UCS
3.0	U+20AE	1		L2/98-329	N1920	Combined PDAM registration and consideration ballot on WD for ISO/IEC 10646-1/Amd. 30, AMENDMENT 30: Additional Latin and other characters, 1998-10-28
3.0	U+20AE	1		L2/99-010	N1903 (pdf, html, doc)	Umamaheswaran, V. S. (1998-12-30), "8.2.13", Minutes of WG 2 meeting 35, London, U.K.; 1998-09-21--25
3.0	U+20AF	1		L2/99-025	N1946	Everson, Michael (1999-01-20), Addition of the DRACHMA SIGN to the UCS
3.0	U+20AF	1		L2/99-077.1	N1975	Irish Comments on SC 2 N 3210, 1999-01-20
3.0	U+20AF	1			N2021	Paterson, Bruce (1999-04-05), FPDAM 30 Text - Additional Latin and other char.
3.0	U+20AF	1		L2/99-232	N2003	Umamaheswaran, V. S. (1999-08-03), "6.1.4 and 7.2.1.3", Minutes of WG 2 meeting 36, Fukuoka, Japan, 1999-03-09--15
3.0	U+20AF	1		L2/00-010	N2103	Umamaheswaran, V. S. (2000-01-05), "6.4.5", Minutes of WG 2 meeting 37, Copenhagen, Denmark: 1999-09-13—16
3.0	U+20AF	1		L2/10-253	N3866	Everson, Michael (2010-07-19), Proposal to change the glyph of the DRACHMA SIGN
3.2	U+20B0	1		L2/98-309		Dünßer, Elmar (1998-09-10), "Script D Symbol with Tail" alias "German Penny Symbol"
3.2	U+20B0	1		L2/98-419 (pdf, doc)		Aliprand, Joan (1999-02-05), "Symbol D with a Tail/German Penny Symbol", Approved Minutes -- UTC #78 & NCITS Subgroup L2 # 175 Joint Meeting, San Jose, CA -- December 1-4, 1998
3.2	U+20B0	1		L2/00-092	N2188	Freytag, Asmus (2000-03-14), Proposal to add German Penny Symbol
3.2	U+20B0	1		L2/00-234	N2203 (rtf, txt)	Umamaheswaran, V. S. (2000-07-21), "8.8", Minutes from the SC2/WG2 meeting in Beijing, 2000-03-21 -- 24
3.2	U+20B0	1		L2/01-050	N2253	Umamaheswaran, V. S. (2001-01-21), "7.21", Minutes of the SC2/WG2 meeting in Athens, September 2000, "Disposition: Accept name change from GERMAN PENNY SYMBOL to GERMAN PENNY SIGN"
3.2	U+20B1	1		L2/98-361	N1858	Sato, T. K. (1998-08-21), Addition of Peso sign on ISO/IEC 10646-1
3.2	U+20B1	1		L2/99-010	N1903 (pdf, html, doc)	Umamaheswaran, V. S. (1998-12-30), "8.2.13", Minutes of WG 2 meeting 35, London, U.K.; 1998-09-21--25
3.2	U+20B1	1			N2040	Sato, Takayuki K. (1999-06-10), Peso sign
3.2	U+20B1	1		L2/00-010	N2103	Umamaheswaran, V. S. (2000-01-05), "8.3", Minutes of WG 2 meeting 37, Copenhagen, Denmark: 1999-09-13—16
3.2	U+20B1	1		L2/00-013	N2156	Sato, T. K. (2000-01-06), Peso sign and Peseta sign (U-20A7)
3.2	U+20B1	1		L2/00-053	N2161	Sato, T. K. (2000-02-20), Peso -- Character sample
3.2	U+20B1	1		L2/00-234	N2203 (rtf, txt)	Umamaheswaran, V. S. (2000-07-21), "8.6", Minutes from the SC2/WG2 meeting in Beijing, 2000-03-21 -- 24
3.2	U+20B1	1		L2/00-115R2		Moore, Lisa (2000-08-08), "Motion 83-M2", Minutes Of UTC Meeting #83
4.1	U+20B2..20B3	2		L2/03-095	N2579	Everson, Michael (2003-02-24), Proposal to encode the GUARANI SIGN and the AUSTRAL SIGN in the UCS
4.1	U+20B4..20B5	2		L2/04-139	N2743	Everson, Michael (2004-04-23), Proposal to encode the HRYVNIA SIGN and the CEDI SIGN in the UCS
5.2	U+20B6	1		L2/07-332	N3387	Sewell, David R. (2007-11-24), Proposal to encode the Livre Tournois sign in the UCS
5.2	U+20B6	1		L2/08-003		Moore, Lisa (2008-02-14), "Livre Tournois Sign", UTC #114 Minutes
5.2	U+20B6	1		L2/08-318	N3453 (pdf, doc)	Umamaheswaran, V. S. (2008-08-13), "M52.20c", Unconfirmed minutes of WG 2 meeting 52
5.2	U+20B7	1		L2/08-115	N3390	Everson, Michael (2008-03-06), Proposal to encode the Esperanto SPESMILO SIGN in the UCS
5.2	U+20B7	1		L2/08-318	N3453 (pdf, doc)	Umamaheswaran, V. S. (2008-08-13), "M52.20d", Unconfirmed minutes of WG 2 meeting 52
5.2	U+20B7	1		L2/08-161R2		Moore, Lisa (2008-11-05), "Consensus 115-C28", UTC #115 Minutes
5.2	U+20B8	1		L2/08-116	N3392	Everson, Michael (2008-03-06), Proposal to encode the Kazakh TENGE SIGN in the UCS
5.2	U+20B8	1		L2/08-318	N3453 (pdf, doc)	Umamaheswaran, V. S. (2008-08-13), "M52.20e", Unconfirmed minutes of WG 2 meeting 52
5.2	U+20B8	1		L2/08-161R2		Moore, Lisa (2008-11-05), "Kazakh Tenge Sign", UTC #115 Minutes
6.0	U+20B9	1			N3868	Deka, Rabin (2010-07-15), Letter in support of India's National Currency Symbol
6.0	U+20B9	1		L2/10-251		Deka, Rabin (2010-07-16), Proposal to Encode India's National Currency Symbol
6.0	U+20B9	1		L2/10-249R	N3862R	Everson, Michael (2010-07-19), Proposal to encode the INDIAN RUPEE SIGN in the UCS
6.0	U+20B9	1		L2/10-258	N3887	Lata, Swaran (2010-07-19), Proposal to encode the Indian Rupee Symbol in the UCS
6.0	U+20B9	1			N3869	Proposal Summary Form for Indian Rupee Symbol, 2010-07-20
6.0	U+20B9	1		L2/10-299R		Anderson, Deborah; McGowan, Rick; Whistler, Ken (2010-08-06), "RUPEE currency sign", Review of Indic-related L2 documents and Recommendations to the UTC
6.0	U+20B9	1		L2/10-221		Moore, Lisa (2010-08-23), "D.2", UTC #124 / L2 #221 Minutes
6.0	U+20B9	1			N3903 (pdf, doc)	"M57.02a", Unconfirmed minutes of WG2 meeting 57, 2011-03-31
6.2	U+20BA	1		L2/11-353		Moore, Lisa (2011-11-30), "C.8", UTC #129 / L2 #226 Minutes
6.2	U+20BA	1		L2/12-117	N4258R	Everson, Michael (2012-04-17), Proposal to encode the Turkish Lira Sign
6.2	U+20BA	1		L2/12-132	N4273	Uluırmak, Sacit (2012-04-27), Proposal to Encode the Turkish Lira Symbol in the UCS
6.2	U+20BA	1		L2/12-112		Moore, Lisa (2012-05-17), "C.5", UTC #131 / L2 #228 Minutes
6.2	U+20BA	1			N4353 (pdf, doc)	"M60.01", Unconfirmed minutes of WG 2 meeting 60, 2013-05-23
7.0	U+20BB	1		L2/12-242	N4308	Evensen, Nina Marie; Anderson, Deborah (2012-07-24), Proposal for one historic currency character, MARK SIGN
7.0	U+20BB	1		L2/12-239		Moore, Lisa (2012-08-14), "C.10", UTC #132 Minutes
7.0	U+20BB	1		L2/12-371	N4377	Suignard, Michel (2012-10-24), Disposition of comments on SC2 N 4239 (PDAM2.2 text to ISO/IEC 10646 3rd edition)
7.0	U+20BB	1		L2/12-343R2		Moore, Lisa (2012-12-04), "Consensus 133-C10", UTC #133 Minutes, "Change the name of U+20BB MARK SIGN to NORDIC MARK SIGN."
7.0	U+20BB	1			N4353 (pdf, doc)	"M60.05d", Unconfirmed minutes of WG 2 meeting 60, 2013-05-23
7.0	U+20BC	1		L2/11-231R		Yevstifeyev, Mykyta (2011-08-05), Revised Proposal to encode Azerbaijani manat sign in the UCS (minor update)
7.0	U+20BC	1		L2/11-366		Pentzlin, Karl (2011-10-21), Additional evidence for the Azerbaijan Manat symbol as proposed in L2/11-231R
7.0	U+20BC	1		L2/11-420	N4163	Pentzlin, Karl (2011-10-31), Letter from Central Bank of Azerbaijan Regarding Manat Sign
7.0	U+20BC	1		L2/12-047	N4168	Proposal to add the currency sign for the Azerbaijani Manat to the UCS, 2011-11-10
7.0	U+20BC	1		L2/13-180	N4445	Pentzlin, Karl (2013-06-10), Proposal to add the currency sign for the Azerbaijani Manat to the UCS
7.0	U+20BC	1		L2/13-132		Moore, Lisa (2013-07-29), "Consensus 136-C5", UTC #136 Minutes, "Accept U+20BC MANAT SIGN for encoding in Unicode 7.0"
7.0	U+20BC	1			N4403 (pdf, doc)	Umamaheswaran, V. S. (2014-01-28), "10.3.8 Azerbaijani Manat currency sign", Unconfirmed minutes of WG 2 meeting 61, Holiday Inn, Vilnius, Lithuania; 2013-06-10/14
7.0	U+20BD	1		L2/14-039	N4529	Proposal to add the currency sign for the RUSSIAN RUBLE to the UCS, 2014-01-21
7.0	U+20BD	1		L2/14-053		Anderson, Deborah; Whistler, Ken; McGowan, Rick; Pournader, Roozbeh; Iancu, Laurențiu (2014-01-26), "24", Recommendations to UTC #138 February 2014 on Script Proposals
7.0	U+20BD	1		L2/13-235R2	N4512R2	Everson, Michael (2014-02-04), Proposal to encode the RUBLE SIGN in the UCS
7.0	U+20BD	1		L2/14-026		Moore, Lisa (2014-02-17), "E.1.2", UTC #138 Minutes
7.0	U+20BD	1			N4553 (pdf, doc)	Umamaheswaran, V. S. (2014-09-16), "M62.02a, M62.02e", Minutes of WG 2 meeting 62 Adobe, San Jose, CA, USA
8.0	U+20BE	1		L2/14-170		Anderson, Deborah; Whistler, Ken; McGowan, Rick; Pournader, Roozbeh; Iancu, Laurențiu (2014-07-28), "14", Recommendations to UTC #140 August 2014 on Script Proposals
8.0	U+20BE	1		L2/14-161R	N4593	Shermazanashvili, Giorgi (2014-08-14), Adding Georgian Lari currency sign
8.0	U+20BE	1		L2/14-177		Moore, Lisa (2014-10-17), "Adding Georgian Lari currency sign (E.2)", UTC #140 Minutes
8.0	U+20BE	1		L2/15-168		Shermazanashvili, Giorgi (2015-07-06), The Lari Symbol: Implementation Principles and Supplementary Manual
8.0	U+20BE	1		L2/15-204		Anderson, Deborah; et al. (2015-07-25), "12. Currency Symbols", Recommendations to UTC #144 July 2015 on Script Proposals
8.0	U+20BE	1		L2/15-187		Moore, Lisa (2015-08-11), "B.13.3.1", UTC #144 Minutes
8.0	U+20BE	1		L2/16-052	N4603 (pdf, doc)	Umamaheswaran, V. S. (2015-09-01), "M63.11q", Unconfirmed minutes of WG 2 meeting 63
8.0	U+20BE	1			N4739	"6.3 E3", Unconfirmed minutes of WG 2 meeting 64, 2016-08-31
10.0	U+20BF	1		L2/11-129		van Geloven, Sander (2011-03-24), Addition of Bitcoin Sign
10.0	U+20BF	1		L2/11-116		Moore, Lisa (2011-05-17), "C.14", UTC #127 / L2 #224 Minutes
10.0	U+20BF	1		L2/15-229		Shirriff, Ken (2015-10-02), Proposal for addition of bitcoin sign
10.0	U+20BF	1		L2/15-312		Anderson, Deborah; Whistler, Ken; McGowan, Rick; Pournader, Roozbeh; Glass, Andrew; Iancu, Laurențiu (2015-11-01), "9. Bitcoin", Recommendations to UTC #145 November 2015 on Script Proposals
10.0	U+20BF	1		L2/15-254		Moore, Lisa (2015-11-16), "E.2", UTC #145 Minutes
10.0	U+20BF	1		L2/19-243	N5106	Suignard, Michel (2019-06-20), "E1", Disposition of comments on ISO/IEC CD.2 10646 6th edition
14.0	U+20C0	1		L2/20-261		Proposal to add the currency sign for the KYRGYZ SOM, 2020-07-10
14.0	U+20C0	1		L2/20-250		Anderson, Deborah; Whistler, Ken; Pournader, Roozbeh; Moore, Lisa; Constable, Peter; Liang, Hai (2020-10-01), "19. Currency Symbol", Recommendations to UTC #165 October 2020 on Script Proposals
14.0	U+20C0	1		L2/20-237		Moore, Lisa (2020-10-27), "Consensus 165-C20", UTC #165 Minutes
17.0	U+20C1	1		L2/25-073		Alkatheri, Saleh Saeed (2025-02-20), Proposal to Encode the New Saudi Riyal Symbol
17.0	U+20C1	1		L2/25-074		Maqtari, Sultan (2025-02-21), Proposal to Update the Shape of the Saudi Riyal Symbol (U+FDFC)
17.0	U+20C1	1		L2/25-072		Miller, Kirk (2025-02-24), Unicode request for Saudi riyal sign
17.0	U+20C1	1		L2/25-075		Proposal to add the currency sign for the SAUDI RIYAL to the UCS, 2025-03-07
17.0	U+20C1	1		L2/25-076		Pournader, Roozbeh; Goregaokar, Manish; Constable, Peter; Kučera, Jan (2025-03-10), SEW Recommendations on Encoding the Saudi Riyal Currency Symbol
17.0	U+20C1	1		L2/25-091R		Kučera, Jan; et al. (2025-04-22), "1.1 Saudi Riyal Sign", Recommendations to UTC #183 (April 2025) on Script Proposals
17.0	U+20C1	1		L2/25-085		Leroy, Robin (2025-04-28), "D.1 1.1 Saudi Riyal Sign", UTC #183 Minutes
18.0	U+20C2	1		L2/25-122		Rahman, Naail Abdul; Shafeeu, Abdulla (2025-05-15), Proposal to encode (Maldivian) Rufiyaa Sign in the Unicode Standard
18.0	U+20C2	1		L2/25-091R		Kučera, Jan; et al. (2025-04-22), "5.1 Maldivian Rufiyaa Sign", Recommendations to UTC #183 (April 2025) on Script Proposals
18.0	U+20C2	1		L2/25-187		Kučera, Jan; Anderson, Deborah; Pournader, Roozbeh; Constable, Peter; Goregaokar, Manish; Leroy, Robin (2025-07-18), "2.2 Maldivian Rufiyaa Sign", Recommendations to UTC #184 (July 2025) on Script Proposals
18.0	U+20C2	1		L2/25-181		Leroy, Robin (2025-08-07), "Consensus 184-C18:Provisionally assign one code point for U+20C2 RUFIYAA SIGN ...", UTC #184 Minutes
18.0	U+20C2	1		L2/25-226		"Consensus 185-C39", UTC #185 Minutes, 2025-10-29, "UTC accepts for encoding in Unicode 18.0 ..."
18.0	U+20C3	1		L2/25-159	N5322	Proposal for the Inclusion of the UAE Dirham Currency Sign in ISO/IEC 10646 in the Currency Symbol Block, 2025-05-29
18.0	U+20C3	1		L2/25-174		van de Ven, Bram (June 2025), Proposal to Encode the UAE Dirham Currency Symbol in Unicode
18.0	U+20C3	1		L2/25-187		Kučera, Jan; Anderson, Deborah; Pournader, Roozbeh; Constable, Peter; Goregaokar, Manish; Leroy, Robin (2025-07-18), "2.1 UAE Dirham sign", Recommendations to UTC #184 (July 2025) on Script Proposals
18.0	U+20C3	1		L2/25-181		Leroy, Robin (2025-08-07), "Consensus 184-C17", UTC #184 Minutes, "UTC accepts U+20C3 UAE DIRHAM SIGN ..."
18.0	U+20C4	1		L2/26-041		Request to Encode the Omani Rial Currency Symbol in the Unicode Standard, 2025-12-08
18.0	U+20C4	1		L2/26-010		Kučera, Jan; Anderson, Deborah; Constable, Peter; Pournader, Roozbeh (2026-01-19), "3.1 Omani Rial Sign", Recommendations to UTC #186 (January 2026) on Script Proposals
18.0	U+20C4	1		L2/26-003		"Consensus 186-C24", UTC #186 Minutes, 2026-02-01, "UTC accepts U+20C4 OMANI RIAL SIGN ..."
