= Currency symbol =

Symbol used to represent a monetary currency's name

Symbols of the four most widely held reserve currencies (dollar, euro, yen, pound)

A currency symbol or currency sign is a graphic symbol used to denote a currency unit. Usually it is defined by a monetary authority, such as the national central bank for the currency concerned.

A symbol may be positioned in various ways, according to national convention: before, after or between the numeric amounts: $2.50, 2,50€ and 250.

Symbols are neither defined nor listed by international standard ISO 4217, which only assigns three-letter codes.

The generic currency sign (¤) is used as a placeholder.

== Usage ==
When writing currency amounts, the location of the symbol varies by language. For currencies in English-speaking countries and in most of Latin America, (Note: all except French and Dutch possessions) the symbol is placed before the amount, as in $20.50. In most other countries, including many in Europe and Francophone Canada, the symbol is placed after the amount, as in 20,50 €. Exceptionally, the symbol for the Cape Verdean escudo (like the now-lapsed Portuguese escudo, to which it was formerly pegged) is placed in the decimal separator position, as in 250.

== Design ==
Formal dimensions of the euro sign

The euro sign as implemented in a selection of typefaces

Older currency symbols have evolved slowly, often from previous currencies. The modern dollar and peso symbols originated from the mark employed to denote the Spanish dollar, whereas the pound and lira symbols evolved from the letter L (written until the seventeenth century in blackletter type as $\mathfrak{L}$) standing for libra, a Roman pound of silver.

Newly invented currencies and currencies adopting new symbols have symbolism meaningful to their adopter. For example, the euro sign € is based on ϵ, an archaic form of the Greek epsilon, to represent Europe; the Indian rupee sign ₹ is a blend of the Latin letter 'R' with the Devanagari letter र (ra); and the Russian Ruble sign ₽ is based on Р (the Cyrillic capital letter 'er').

There are other considerations, such as how the symbol is rendered on computers and typesetting. For a new symbol to be used, its glyphs needs to be added to computer fonts and keyboard mappings already in widespread use, and keyboard layouts need to be altered or shortcuts added to type the new symbol. For example, the European Commission was criticized for not considering how the euro sign would need to be customized to work in different fonts. The original design was also exceptionally wide. These two factors have led to most type foundries designing customized versions that match the 'look and feel' of the font to which it is to be added, often with reduced width.

== List of currency symbols currently in use ==
Currency symbols
| Symbol, Abbreviation | Name | Currency | Notes | Unicode |
|---|---|---|---|---|
| ؋: Af; Afs | afghani | Afghan afghani | Af is the singular and Afs is the plural | U+060B ؋ AFGHANI SIGN |
| — Ar | ariary | Malagasy ariary | | |
| ฿ | baht | Thai baht | Also B when ฿ is unavailable | U+0E3F ฿ THAI CURRENCY SYMBOL BAHT |
| — B/. | balboa | Panamanian balboa | | |
| — Br | birr | Ethiopian birr | | |
| — Bs | bolívar | Venezuelan bolívar | | |
| — Bs | boliviano | Bolivian boliviano | | |
| — Cg | guilder | Caribbean guilder | | |
| ₵ | cedi | Ghanaian cedi | | U+20B5 ₵ CEDI SIGN |
| ¢ c | cent, centavo, etc. | | Fraction; A centesimal subdivision of many currencies | U+00A2 ¢ CENT SIGN |
| — Ch | chhertum | Bhutanese chhertum | Fraction; A centesimal division of the ngultrum | |
| ₡ | colon | Costa Rican colón | Also C when ₡ is unavailable | U+20A1 ₡ COLON SIGN |
| — C$ | córdoba | Nicaraguan córdoba | Also used informally for Canadian dollar; see Can$. | |
| — D | dalasi | Gambian dalasi | | |
| —: ден; DEN | denar | Macedonian denar | | |
| —: дин; DIN | dinar | Serbian dinar | | |
| —: .د.ج; DA | dinar | Algerian dinar | | |
| —: .د.ب; BD | dinar | Bahraini dinar | | |
| —: .د.ع; ID | dinar | Iraqi dinar | | |
| —: .د.أ; JD | dinar | Jordanian dinar | | |
| —: .د.ك; KD | dinar | Kuwaiti dinar | | |
| —: .د.ل; LD | dinar | Libyan dinar | | |
| —: .د.ت; DT | dinar | Tunisian dinar | | |
| —: .د.م; DH; Dh; Dhs | dirham | Moroccan dirham | Dh is the singular and Dhs is the plural | |
| | dirham | Emirati dirham | | U+20C3 ⃃ UAE DIRHAM SIGN |
| — Db | dobra | São Tomé and Príncipe dobra | | |
| $ | dollar | A$: Australian dollar; B$: Bahamian dollar; Bds$: Barbadian dollar; BZ$: Belize dollar; Ber$: Bermudian dollar; B$: Brunei dollar; Can$, CA$, C$: Canadian dollar; CI$: Cayman Islands dollar; EC$: Eastern Caribbean dollar; FJ$: Fijian dollar; G$: Guyanese dollar; HK$; 元; 圓 : Hong Kong dollar; J$: Jamaican dollar; $: Kiribati dollar; L$: Liberian dollar; N$: Namibian dollar; $NZ: New Zealand dollar; S$: Singapore dollar; SI$: Solomon Islands dollar; SRD: Surinamese dollar; NT$; 元; 圓 : New Taiwan dollar; TT$: Trinidad and Tobago dollar; TV$: Tuvaluan dollar; US$; $ : United States dollar | May appear with either one or two bars; in Unicode considered as a variant glyph of the same grapheme . See also: R$, T$, and WS$ | U+0024 $ DOLLAR SIGN |
| $ | peso | Arg$: Argentine peso; Ch$: Chilean peso; Col$: Colombian peso; Cu$: Cuban peso; RD$: Dominican peso; Mex$: Mexican peso; Ur$: Uruguayan peso | | U+0024 $ DOLLAR SIGN |
| $ | pataca | $: Macanese pataca | | U+0024 $ DOLLAR SIGN |
| ₫: đ; Đ | dong | Vietnamese đồng | | U+20AB ₫ DONG SIGN |
| ֏ | dram | Armenian dram | | U+058F ֏ ARMENIAN DRAM SIGN |
| Esc | escudo | Cape Verdean escudo | Specifically the double-barred dollar sign (cifrão) | U+0024 $ DOLLAR SIGN with a suitable font |
| € | euro | Euro | This euro sign is used in all scripts used in the Eurozone countries (Latin, Cyrillic, Greek); The pre-euro U+20A0 ₠ EURO-CURRENCY SIGN is obsolete. | U+20AC € EURO SIGN |
| فلس فلوس | fils | fils | Fraction; 1/1000 or 1/100 of various Arabic country currencies; see also falus. فلس is singular while فلوس is plural | |
| ƒ fl | florin | Aruban florin | or an italic f with descender (f). See also florin sign. | U+0192 ƒ LATIN SMALL LETTER F WITH HOOK |
| — Ft | forint | Hungarian forint | | |
| — FBu | franc | Burundian franc | | |
| — F | franc | F: CFP franc; F: Central African CFA franc; FC: Comorian franc; FC: Congolese franc; Fdj; DF : Djiboutian franc; FG; GFr : Guinean franc; FRw: Rwanda franc; SFr: Swiss franc; F: West African CFA franc | | |
| — G | gourde | Haitian gourde | | |
| — gr | grosz | Polish grosz | Fraction; A centesimal division of the złoty | |
| ₲ | guarani | Paraguayan guaraní | Also Gs when ₲ is unavailable | U+20B2 ₲ GUARANI SIGN |
| — h | heller | Czech heller | Fraction; A centesimal division of the koruna | |
| ₴: грн; hrn | hryvnia | Ukrainian hryvnia | | U+20B4 ₴ HRYVNIA SIGN |
| ₭ | kip | Lao kip | Also K or KN when ₭ is unavailable | U+20AD ₭ KIP SIGN |
| — Kč | koruna | Czech crown | | |
| — kr | krone; krona | DKK: Danish krone; NOK: Norwegian krone; SEK: Swedish krona; ISK: Icelandic króna; kr: Faroese króna | | |
| — Kz | kwanza | Angolan kwanza | | |
| — K | kina, kwacha | K: Papua New Guinean kina; MK: Malawian kwacha; ZK: Zambian kwacha | | |
| —: K; Ks | kyat | Myanmar kyat | K is the singular form and Ks is the plural | |
| ₾ | lari | Georgian lari | | U+20BE ₾ LARI SIGN |
| — Lek | lek | Albanian lek | Also occasionally L | |
| — L | lempira | Honduran lempira | Also used as the currency symbol for the Lesotho and Swazi currencies as the singular form. Also used as a pound sign (see: Lebanese, Sudanese and Syrian pounds and Turkish lira) | |
| —: leu; lei | leu | Romanian leu; Moldovan leu | Leu is the singular and Lei is the plural. Also sometimes L | |
| — Le | leone | Sierra Leonean leone | | |
| —: L; E | lilangeni | Swazi lilangeni | L is the singular and E is the plural | |
| ₺ | lira | Turkish lira | Previously official sign was TL, still used when ₺ is unavailable | U+20BA ₺ TURKISH LIRA SIGN |
| —: L; M | loti | Lesotho loti | L is the singular and M is the plural | |
| ₼ | manat | Azerbaijani manat; Turkmenistani manat | Also m or man. when ₼ is unavailable | U+20BC ₼ MANAT SIGN |
| — KM | mark | Bosnia and Herzegovina convertible mark | | |
| — Mt | metical | Mozambican metical | Also MTn | |
| — Nfk | nakfa | Eritrean nakfa | Also Nfa | |
| ₦ | naira | Nigerian naira | Also N when ₦ is unavailable | U+20A6 ₦ NAIRA SIGN |
| — Nu | ngultrum | Bhutanese ngultrum | | |
| — UM | ouguiya | Mauritanian ouguiya | | |
| — T$ | paanga | Tongan paʻanga | | |
| | paisa | Indian paisa | Fraction; Centesimal division of the Indian rupee. Minimally used (if ever). Before 2010, official sign was ps. | Not in Unicode |
| ps | paisa | Pakistani and Nepalese paisas | Fraction; A centesimal division of the rupee | |
| — p | penny | Penny sterling, and the pegged pennies of Alderney, the Falklands, Gibraltar, Guernsey, Jersey, Isle of Man and Saint Helena | Fraction; The centesimal subdivision of a pound sterling, known as the "New Penny" when introduced in 1971 | |
| — p | piastre | Lebanese and Syrian piastres | A centesimal subdivision of the Lebanese and Syrian pounds | |
| ₱ | peso | Philippine peso | Also with three bars or none | U+20B1 ₱ PESO SIGN |
| — PT | piastre | Egyptian and Sudanese piastres | Fraction; A centesimal subdivision of the Egyptian and Sudanese pounds | |
| —: .ج.م; LE | pound | Egyptian pound | Also abbreviated £E in Latin script | |
| —: .ل.ل; LL | pound | Lebanese pound | Also abbreviated £L in Latin script | |
| — LS | pound | .ج.س: Sudanese pound; .ل.س: Syrian pound | Sudanese pound also abbreviated £Sd in Latin script. Syrian pound also abbreviated £S, £Syr and SP in Latin script. | |
| £ | pound | Pound sterling | May be displayed with one or two bars, depending on typeface. | U+00A3 £ POUND SIGN |
| — SSP | pound | South Sudanese pound | Also represented by £ | |
| — P | pula | Botswana pula | | |
| — Q | quetzal | Guatemalan quetzal | | |
| — q | qintar | Albanian qintar | Fraction; A centesimal subdivision of the lek | |
| — R | rand | South African rand | | |
| — R$ | real | Brazilian real | The $ is sometimes written with a double bar like a double-barred dollar sign: | |
| ﷼: IR; Rl; Rls | rial | Iranian rial | Rl is singular and Rls is plural | U+FDFC ﷼ RIAL SIGN |
| —: .ر.ي; YRl; YRls; Rl; Rls | rial | Yemeni rial | Rl is singular and Rls is plural | |
| ⃁ | riyal | Saudi riyal | This code point for this symbol was added to Unicode in September 2025 and will take time to be implemented in computer fonts, In the meantime, you may see a question mark, box, or other symbol instead of the intended character. | U+20C1 ⃁ SAUDI RIYAL SIGN |
| | rial | Omani rial | | U+20C4 ⃄ OMANI RIAL SIGN |
| —: .ر.ق; QR | rial | Qatari riyal | | |
| ៛ CR | riel | Cambodian riel | | U+17DB ៛ KHMER CURRENCY SYMBOL RIEL |
| — RM | ringgit | Malaysian ringgit | | |
| руб | rubel | Belarusian rubel | | |
| ₽ руб | ruble | Russian ruble | | U+20BD ₽ RUBLE SIGN |
| | rufiyaa | Maldivian rufiyaa | | U+20C2 ⃂ RUFIYAA SIGN |
| ₹ | rupee | Indian rupee | Before 2010, official signs were Re and Rs; still used when ₹ is unavailable | U+20B9 ₹ INDIAN RUPEE SIGN |
| ₨: Re; Rs | rupee | MRe; MRs : Mauritian rupee; रू; NRe; NRs : Nepalese rupee; 𞱱; PRe; PRs : Pakistani Rupee; SRe; SRs; SR : Seychellois rupee; රු; SL Re; SL Rs : Sri Lankan rupee | Re is the singular form and Rs is the plural | U+20A8 ₨ RUPEE SIGN |
| — Rp | rupiah | Indonesian rupiah | | |
| ₪ NIS | shekel | Israeli new shekel | | U+20AA ₪ NEW SHEQEL SIGN |
| — TSh | shilling | Tanzanian shilling | | |
| — KSh | shilling | Kenyan shilling | | |
| — Sh.So. | shilling | Somali shilling | | |
| — USh | shilling | Ugandan shilling | | |
| — S/ | sol | Peruvian sol | | |
| —: ⃀; сом; som | som | Kyrgyzstani som | : Kyrgyz National Bank approved the underlined С (Cyrillic Es) as currency symbol (2017) | U+20C0 ⃀ SOM SIGN |
| — SM | somoni | Tajikistani somoni | | |
| —: сўм; sum | sum | Uzbekistani sum | | |
| ৳ Tk | taka | Bangladeshi taka | The Unicode code character name is "Bengali Rupee sign" | U+09F3 ৳ BENGALI RUPEE SIGN |
| — WS$ | tala | Samoan tālā | Symbol based on previous name "West Samoan tala". Also T and ST. See also: $ | |
| ₸ | tenge | Kazakhstani tenge | Also T when ₸ is unavailable | U+20B8 ₸ TENGE SIGN |
| ₮ | togrog | Mongolian tögrög | Also Tog when ₮ is unavailable | U+20AE ₮ TUGRIK SIGN |
| — VT | vatu | Vanuatu vatu | | |
| ₩ | won | North Korean won; South Korean won ( 원; 圓 ) | | U+20A9 ₩ WON SIGN & U+FFE6 ￦ FULLWIDTH WON SIGN |
| ¥ | yuan | Chinese Renminbi yuan ( 元; 圆) | Used with one and two crossbars, depending on font 元 is also used in reference to the Macanese pataca and the Hong Kong and Taiwanese dollars | U+00A5 ¥ YEN SIGN & U+FFE5 ￥ FULLWIDTH YEN SIGN |
| ¥ | yen | Japanese yen ( 円; 圓); | 円 (en, lit. "circle") is usually used in Japan | U+00A5 ¥ YEN SIGN & U+FFE5 ￥ FULLWIDTH YEN SIGN |
| — zł | zloty | Polish złoty | Also zl when ł is unavailable | |
| ¤ | | generic | Generic placeholder for any actual symbol, for example in formatting pattern "12¤00" | U+00A4 ¤ CURRENCY SIGN |

=== Rupee symbols by language ===
Rupee sign in other languages (scripts)
| Language | Sign in Unicode | Currency |
|---|---|---|
| Tamil | U+0BF9 ௹ TAMIL RUPEE SIGN | Indian rupee / Sri Lankan rupee |
| Gujarati | U+0AF1 ૱ GUJARATI RUPEE SIGN | Indian rupee |
| Sinhala | රු (U+0DBB ර SINHALA LETTER RAYANNA) + (U+0DD4 ු SINHALA VOWEL SIGN KETTI PAA-PILLA) | Sri Lankan rupee |
| Urdu language | U+1EC71 𞱱 INDIC SIYAQ NUMBER ONE | Pakistani rupee |
| North Indic | U+A838 ꠸ NORTH INDIC RUPEE MARK | Indian rupee |
| Wancho | U+1E2FF 𞋿 WANCHO NGUN SIGN | Indian rupee |

== List of historical currency symbols ==
Some of these symbols may not display correctly.

| Symbol | Uses | Unicode |
|---|---|---|
| ₳ | Argentine austral (1985–1991) | U+20B3 ₳ AUSTRAL SIGN |
| Cz$ | Brazilian cruzado (1986–1989) | |
| ₢$ | Brazilian cruzeiro (1942–1967) | U+20A2 ₢ CRUZEIRO SIGN |
| Cr$ | Brazilian cruzeiro (1970–1986); Brazilian cruzeiro (1990–1993) | |
| CR$ | Brazilian cruzeiro real (1993–1994) | |
| NCz$ | Brazilian cruzado novo (1989–1990) | |
| NCr$ | Brazilian cruzeiro novo (1967–1970) | |
| Rs$ | Brazilian real (1747–1942) | |
| ₰ | Pfennig, a subdivision of the German Mark (1875–1923) and the German Reichsmark (1923–1948) | U+20B0 ₰ GERMAN PENNY SIGN |
| M | East German Deutsche Mark (east) (1948–1964) | |
| DM | West German and united German Deutsche Mark (west) (1948–2001) | |
| ₻ | Nordic mark symbol used by Ludvig Holberg in Denmark and Norway in the 17th and 18th centuries | U+20BB ₻ NORDIC MARK SIGN |
| ₯ | Greek drachma | U+20AF ₯ DRACHMA SIGN |
| ₠ | ECU (1979–1998, not widely used and now historical; replaced by the euro) | U+20A0 ₠ EURO-CURRENCY SIGN |
| Eº | Chilean escudo (1960–1975) | |
| ƒ | Dutch gulden, currently used in Aruba; See Aruban Florin | U+0192 ƒ LATIN SMALL LETTER F WITH HOOK |
| F, ₣ | French franc (1795–2002) | U+20A3 ₣ FRENCH FRANC SIGN (Note: A currency symbol for the French franc was proposed in 1988 but never adopted. ₣ is a compatibility character with no formal status. (See French franc#Notes for details.)) |
| Kčs | Czechoslovak koruna (1919–1993) | |
| kn | Croatian kuna (1994–2023) | |
| L, ₤ | Italian lira (1861–2002) | U+20A4 ₤ LIRA SIGN (Note: There was standard symbol for the Italian lira. ₤ is a compatibility character with no formal status. (See Italian lira#Notation and symbols for details.)) |
| Lm | Maltese lira | |
| lp | Lipa, a subdivision of the Croatian kuna (1994–2023) | |
| Ls | Latvian lats (1922–2013, not continuously) | |
| Lt | Lithuanian litas (1922–2014, not continuously) | |
| M | East German Mark der DDR (1968–1990) | |
| ℳ︁ | German Mark (1875–1923) | U+2133 ℳ SCRIPT CAPITAL M |
| MDN | East German Mark der Deutschen Notenbank (1964–1968) | |
| mk | Finnish markka (1860–2002) | |
| ₥ | Mill | U+20A5 ₥ MILL SIGN |
| o$s | Argentine peso oro sellado (1881–1970) | |
| PF | Philippine peso fuerte (1852–1901) | |
| ₡ | Salvadoran colón (1892–2001) | U+20A1 ₡ COLON SIGN |
| ₧ | Spanish peseta (1869–2002) | U+20A7 ₧ PESETA SIGN |
| R or RD | Swedish riksdaler (1777–1873) | |
| ℛ︁ℳ︁ | Reichsmark (1923–1948) | U+211B ℛ SCRIPT CAPITAL R U+2133 ℳ SCRIPT CAPITAL M |
| Double-barred dollar sign | Portuguese escudo (cifrão) | |
| Sk | Slovak koruna (1993–2008) | |
| ₷ | Spesmilo (1907 – First World War) in the Esperanto movement | U+20B7 ₷ SPESMILO SIGN |
| ₶ | Livre tournois (13th century – 1795) | U+20B6 ₶ LIVRE TOURNOIS SIGN |
| 𐆚 | As coin used during the Roman Empire and Roman Republic | U+1019A 𐆚 ROMAN AS SIGN |
| 𐆖 | Denarius coin used in Ancient Rome from 211 BC to the 3rd century AD | U+10196 𐆖 ROMAN DENARIUS SIGN |
| 𐆙 | Dupondius coin used during the Roman Empire and Roman Republic | U+10199 𐆙 ROMAN DUPONDIUS SIGN |
| 𐆗 | Quinarius coin used in Ancient Rome from 211 BC to the 3rd century AD | U+10197 𐆗 ROMAN QUINARIUS SIGN |
| 𐆘 | Sestertius coin used in Ancient Rome from 211 BC to the 3rd century AD | U+10198 𐆘 ROMAN SESTERTIUS SIGN |
| I/. | Peruvian inti (1985-1991) | |
| ৲ | Bangladeshi taka mark | U+09F2 ৲ BENGALI RUPEE MARK |
| ৹ | Bangladeshi ānā, historically used to represent 1/16 of a taka or rupee | U+09F9 ৹ BENGALI CURRENCY DENOMINATOR SIXTEEN |
| ৻ | Bangladeshi gaṇḍā, historically used to represent 1/20 of an ānā (1/320 of a taka or rupee) | U+09FB ৻ BENGALI GANDA MARK |
| ߾ | Dorome sign using the N'Ko alphabet | U+07FE ߾ NKO DOROME SIGN |
| ߿ | Taman sign using the N'Ko alphabet | U+07FF ߿ NKO TAMAN SIGN |
| 𞲰 | Indic Siyaq rupee mark | U+1ECB0 𞲰 INDIC SIYAQ RUPEE MARK |

The Unicode CJK Compatibility block contains several square versions of the names of currencies in Japanese katakana. They are intended for compatibility with earlier character sets.

== See also ==
- List of currencies
- List of circulating currencies
- Currency Symbols (Unicode block)
- Currency sign (generic)
