= Saudi riyal sign =

Currency symbol of Saudi Arabia

⃁

Saudi riyal sign
- In Unicode: U+20C1 ⃁ SAUDI RIYAL SIGN

Currency
- Currency: Saudi riyal

Different from
- Different from: U+FDFC ﷼ RIAL SIGN

The Saudi riyal symbol.

The Saudi riyal sign (⃁) is the official currency symbol for the Saudi riyal (SAR), the currency of Saudi Arabia. On 20 February 2025, King Salman officially approved the symbol, and the Saudi Central Bank (SAMA) announced its adoption. The symbol represents the Saudi riyal in all financial and commercial transactions at local, regional, and international levels, and its implementation will be gradual, coordinated across all relevant entities.

Saudi Arabia is the first Arab country to issue a symbol for its currency, aiming to strengthen the national currency's identity, promote pride in national and cultural heritage, develop the financial sector, and highlight the Kingdom's position among major global economies and G20 countries, in line with Saudi Vision 2030. The development of the symbol involved collaboration between SAMA, the Ministry of Culture, the Ministry of Media, and the Saudi Standards, Metrology and Quality Organization.

The symbol consists of the Arabic word: "ريال" (Riyal), inspired by Arabic calligraphy. Its international three-letter code, according to ISO 4217, is SAR. The symbol is intended to streamline the representation of the Saudi riyal in all financial and commercial contexts, both locally and internationally.

== Design ==
Official geometric design specifications of the Saudi riyal symbol, provided by the Saudi Central Bank.

The Saudi riyal symbol was developed in three phases under a royal directive, with a committee composed of national authorities including the Saudi Central Bank, the Ministry of Culture, the Ministry of Media, and the Saudi Standards, Metrology and Quality Organization. An official guide was issued detailing the symbol’s design, usage, and related specifications.

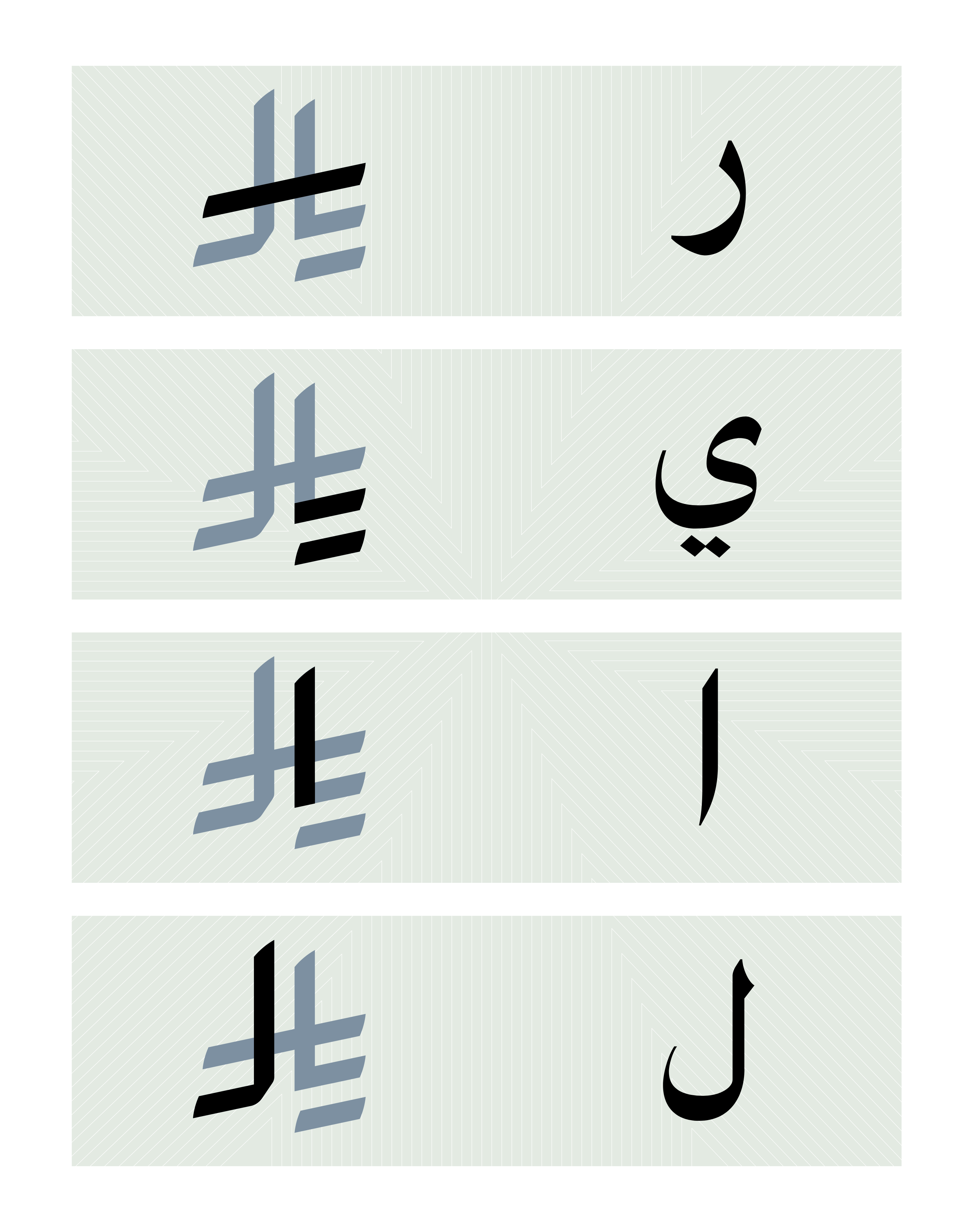
The Arabic letters “ر ي ا ل” that form the symbol.

According to the official statement, the first phase focused on ensuring that the symbol met the highest technical standards applied globally for currency symbols. Emphasis was placed on representing the Kingdom's national identity, blending tradition with modernity. The design adopted the name of the national currency, “Riyal”, using Arabic letters as a tribute to Arabic language and culture.

The second phase involved technical evaluations, development, and precise reviews to ensure ease of implementation and usability in financial and commercial systems. The third phase culminated in the official approval of the symbol by the King and its public announcement.

The geometric dimensions of the design were specified with precise standards for spacing and curves to define the symbol’s shape while preserving the Arabic letter forms. The letter rāʾ (ر) in “Riyal” intersects the symbol, forming a crossbar similar to that of most global currency symbols. Eight rules were established for using the symbol with numerical values, including that it should always be placed to the left of the number in all languages, with a space between the symbol and the number.

== Usage and implementation ==
With the launch of the Saudi riyal symbol, the Saudi Central Bank released a usage guide along with three primary file formats for the symbol: SVG, PNG, and EPS. The symbol was adopted for use across all fields and financial transactions involving the Saudi currency, including public texts and documents, banking services, trading platforms, economic reports and contracts, invoices and receipts, e-commerce applications and stores, and product price tags. The Ministry of Commerce mandated that the private sector across all economic activities use the symbol in public texts and documents as well as in the pricing of goods, services, and products wherever the currency value appears, in compliance with the standard formats issued by the Saudi Central Bank.

=== Usage guidelines ===
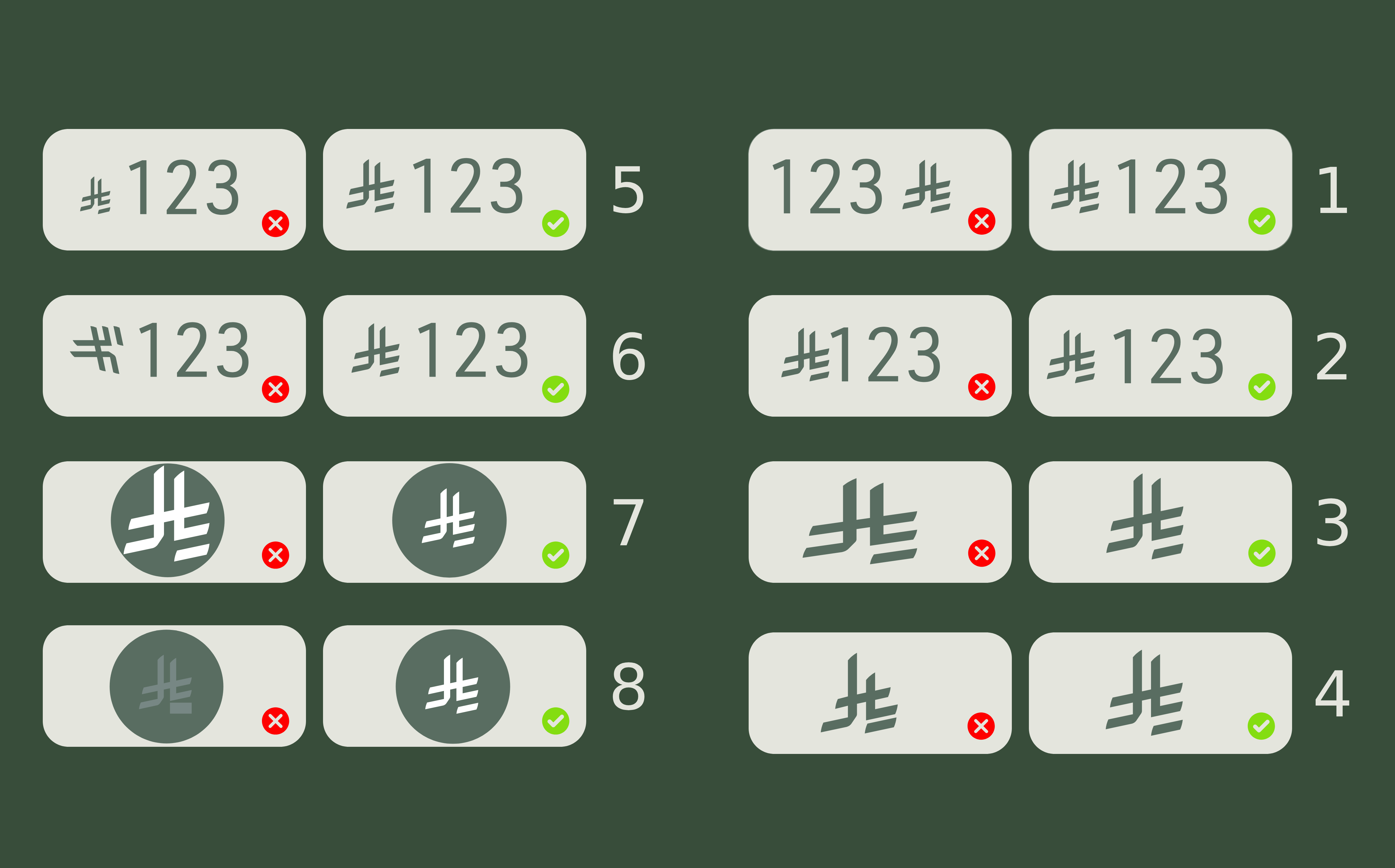
Official rules for using the Saudi riyal symbol

The Saudi Central Bank published eight main rules in its official guide to follow when writing the symbol.

1. Position: The symbol should always appear to the left of the numeric value in all languages.
2. Spacing: Leave a space between the symbol and the numeric value.
3. Proportion: Maintain the proportional shape of the symbol.
4. Geometric structure: Preserve the geometric design of the symbol.
5. Alignment: Match the height of the symbol with the text height.
6. Direction: Align the symbol’s direction with the text direction.
7. Clear space: Maintain a clear space equivalent to one-third of the symbol’s height around it.
8. Color contrast: Ensure sufficient contrast between the symbol and background colors.

== Use on digital devices ==
To use the symbol on a digital device (smartphone, tablet, computer), it was necessary first that the symbol be allocated a codepoint in Unicode and then that vendors update their systems and computer fonts to recognise the new codepoint. The first phase was formally completed with the release of Unicode 17.0 in September 2025 (the Saudi riyal symbol is encoded in Unicode as U+20C1 ⃁ SAUDI RIYAL SIGN in the Currency Symbols block,) but its inclusion in a variety of computer fonts will take some time. As with all characters with a Unicode code point, the precise appearance of the symbol may differ between fonts but the underlying codepoint is always the same.

== History of the symbol's adoption in Unicode ==
=== Submission of the proposal ===
Several individuals, as well as the Saudi Central Bank, submitted different official proposals to the Unicode Consortium to encode the Saudi riyal symbol for use in digital systems and to include it in the Universal Coded Character Set (ISO/IEC 10646). Among these, the Saudi Central Bank’s proposal (L2/25-075), dated 7 March 2025, was adopted.

The Script Encoding Working Group (SEW) recommended adding the symbol at the available code point (U+20C1) in the "Currency Symbols" block, under the name SAUDI RIYAL SIGN, as proposed in the Saudi Central Bank’s submission. The proposal was subsequently discussed during the Consortium’s 183rd meeting, held between 22 and 24 April 2025, and was approved on the first day without changes to the specifications.

| Version | Final code points (Note: Proposed code points and characters names may differ from final code points and names) | Count | UTC ID | L2 ID | WG2 ID | Document |
|---|---|---|---|---|---|---|
| 17.0 | U+20C1 | 1 | | L2/25-073 | | Alkatheri, Saleh Saeed (2025-02-20), Proposal to Encode the New Saudi Riyal Symbol |
| 17.0 | U+20C1 | 1 | | L2/25-074 | | Maqtari, Sultan (2025-02-21), Proposal to Update the Shape of the Saudi Riyal Symbol (U+FDFC) |
| 17.0 | U+20C1 | 1 | | L2/25-072 | | Miller, Kirk (2025-02-24), Unicode request for Saudi riyal sign |
| 17.0 | U+20C1 | 1 | | L2/25-075 | | Proposal to add the currency sign for the SAUDI RIYAL to the UCS, 2025-03-07 |
| 17.0 | U+20C1 | 1 | | L2/25-076 | | Pournader, Roozbeh; Goregaokar, Manish; Constable, Peter; Kučera, Jan (2025-03-10), SEW Recommendations on Encoding the Saudi Riyal Currency Symbol |
| 17.0 | U+20C1 | 1 | | L2/25-091R | | Kučera, Jan; et al. (2025-04-22), "1.1 Saudi Riyal Sign", Recommendations to UTC #183 (April 2025) on Script Proposals |
| 17.0 | U+20C1 | 1 | | L2/25-085 | | Leroy, Robin (2025-04-28), "D.1 1.1 Saudi Riyal Sign", UTC #183 Minutes |

=== Official release of the codepoint ===
- The Saudi riyal symbol was first included in the Unicode 17.0 beta release on 20 May 2025. It was noted that the symbol might be discussed and possibly revised during the subsequent Unicode Technical Committee meeting 184, scheduled from 22 to 24 July 2025; however, no discussion took place, and it was not included in the agenda of the second meeting.
- The symbol was then officially included in the final release of Unicode 17.0 on 9 September 2025.
- A preliminary update of the symbol followed in October 2025 within the Unicode Common Locale Data Repository (CLDR) project. Initially, the symbol was classified as an alternate symbol rather than a primary symbol, because it is new and not yet widely supported in most fonts. As a result, its shape may not display for users whose devices lack fonts that support it. Over time, as the symbol becomes more widely adopted and included in modern global fonts, it is expected to be designated as a primary symbol.

== Difference between the Saudi riyal and Iranian rial symbols ==
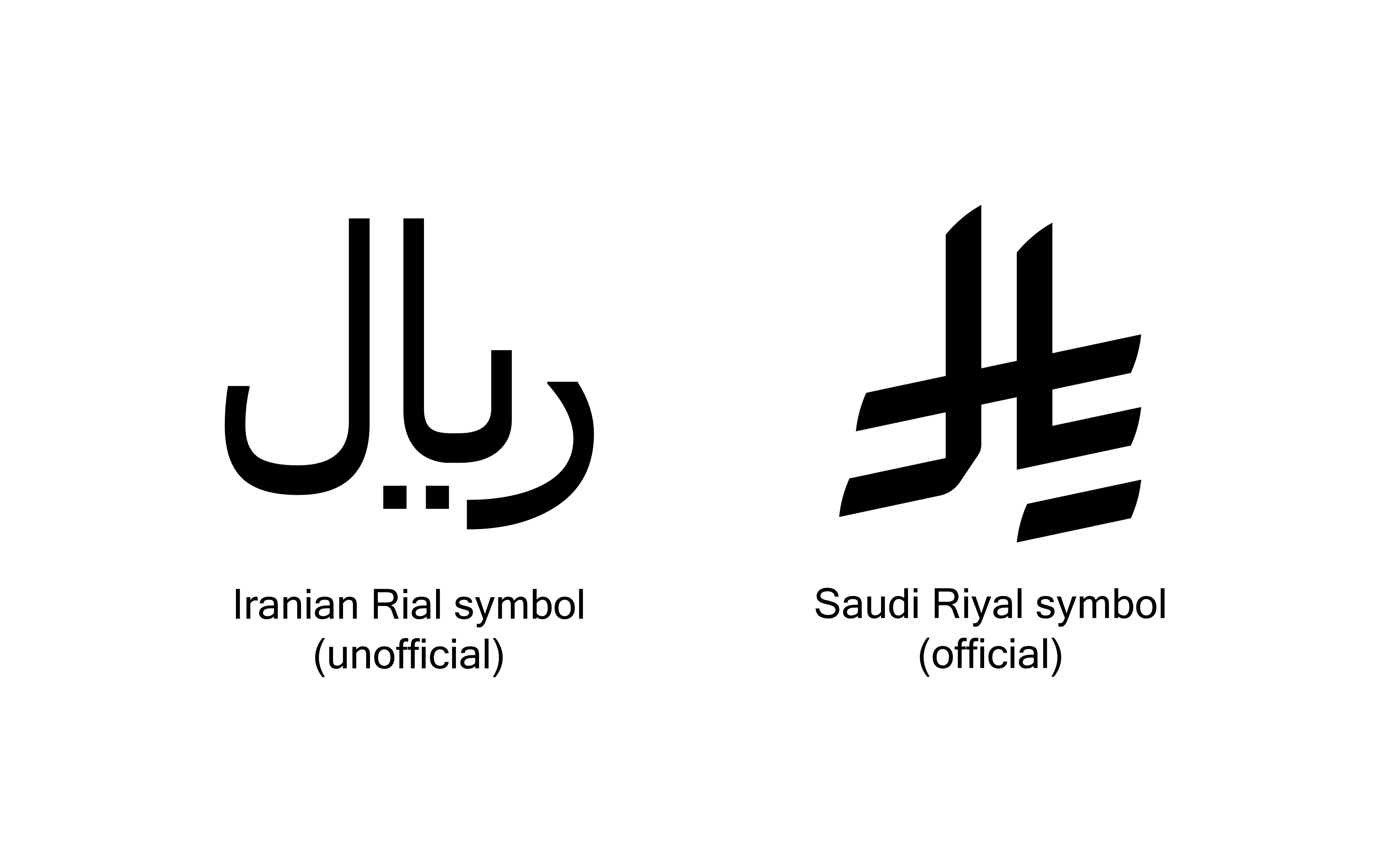
The Saudi riyal symbol (U+20C1 ⃁ SAUDI RIYAL SIGN) and the Iranian rial symbol (U+FDFC ﷼ RIAL SIGN) in Unicode, Microsoft Sans Serif font.

The Saudi riyal symbol (U+20C1 ⃁ SAUDI RIYAL SIGN) may be mistakenly confused with the Iranian rial symbol (U+FDFC ﷼ RIAL SIGN), because both represent currencies with the same name and are depicted using Arabic letters. However, they are different: the Iranian government has never officially issued a symbol for its currency. The Rial sign was created by the Iran National Standards Organization under ISIRI 820 as a compressed form of the word "ریال", occupying a single character space on typewriters, for use with numbers in banks and commercial documents, as a typographic abbreviation, not a currency symbol. The Supreme Council of Informatics of Iran submitted a request to include the symbol in the Unicode Standard in April 2001, which was approved and was included in Unicode 3.2 (March 2002). It is a precomposed character, encoded thus for compatibility with the existing standard (ordinarily, the word ریال (rial) is spelled out from right to left using U+0631 ر ARABIC LETTER REH + U+06CC ی ARABIC LETTER FARSI YEH + U+0627 ا ARABIC LETTER ALEF + U+0644 ل ARABIC LETTER LAM). In contrast, the Saudi Riyal sign is a single independent symbol rather than a composition of multiple characters and therefore is not decomposable.

Comparison of the two symbols (⃁ – ﷼) in Unicode
| Country | Unicode name | Symbol | Code point | Block | Characteristics | Date of release | Unicode version | Status | Requesting authority |
|---|---|---|---|---|---|---|---|---|---|
| Saudi Arabia | SAUDI RIYAL SIGN | ⃁ | U+20C1 | Currency Symbols | Suitable for all languages written from left-to-right or right-to-left | 9 September 2025 | 17.0 | Official (state-recognized) | Saudi Central Bank |
| Saudi Arabia | SAUDI RIYAL SIGN | ⃁ | U+20C1 | Currency Symbols | Independent character | 9 September 2025 | 17.0 | Official (state-recognized) | Saudi Central Bank |
| Iran | RIAL SIGN | ﷼ | U+FDFC | Arabic Presentation Forms-A | Intended for right-to-left languages | 27 March 2002 | 3.2 | Not official (for writing use) | Supreme Council of Informatics of Iran (now the Supreme Council of Cyberspace) |
| Iran | RIAL SIGN | ﷼ | U+FDFC | Arabic Presentation Forms-A | Compatibility character | 27 March 2002 | 3.2 | Not official (for writing use) | Supreme Council of Informatics of Iran (now the Supreme Council of Cyberspace) |

== See also ==
- Euro sign § Design (which describes how the euro sign grapheme is implemented as a different glyph in each of many different typefaces (computer fonts)).
- Indian rupee sign – Currency symbol for the Indian Rupee (INR), given a Unicode codepoint in 2010.
