= Saudi riyal =

Currency of Saudi Arabia

ريال سعودي (Arabic)
- Sixth issue of the Saudi currency Released during the reign of King Salman in 2016

ISO 4217
- Code: SAR (numeric: 682)
- Subunit: 0.01

Units of account
- Base unit: riyal
- Plural: riyālāt (Arabic)
- Symbol: ⃁
- Subunit
- 1/100: halala

Denominations
- Banknotes
- Freq. used: 5, 10, 50, 100, 500 riyals
- Rarely used: 1, 20, 200 riyals
- Coins: 1, 5, 10, 25, 50 halalas, 1 riyal, 2 riyals

Demographics
- Replaced: Hejaz riyal Ottoman lira Maria Theresa thaler
- User(s): Saudi Arabia

Issuance
- Central bank: Saudi Central Bank
- Website: sama.gov.sa

Valuation
- Inflation: -2.09% (Average of 2019)
- Source: Saudi Central Bank, Jan 2014 est.
- Pegged with: U.S. dollar (USD) $1 USD = 3.75 SAR

The Saudi riyal (symbol: ⃁; code: SAR) is the currency of Saudi Arabia. Each riyal, the base unit, is subdivided into 100 halala (Arabic: هللة Halalah).

== History ==
The riyal has been the currency of Saudi Arabia since the country came into being and was the currency of Hejaz before Saudi Arabia was created, one of the primary currencies in the Mediterranean region during the Ottoman era. The Hejaz riyal was based on but not equivalent to the Ottoman 20 kuruş coin and was consequently divided into 20 qirsh. However, although the Hejaz riyal was the same weight as the Ottoman 20 kuruş, it was minted in .917 fineness, compared to .830 fineness for the Ottoman coin. Thus, because the first Saudi riyal had the same specifications as the Hejaz riyal and circulated alongside Ottoman coins, it came to be worth 22 Ottoman kuruş and was consequently subdivided into 22 ghirsh when coins denominated in qirsh were issued from 1925. The system remained even though the riyal was subsequently debased to a coin equivalent, in silver content, to the Indian rupee in 1935.

In 1960, the system was changed to 20 qirsh to a riyal, which was followed in 1963 by the introduction of the halala, one hundredth of a riyal. Some Saudi coins still bear denominations in qirsh, but it is no longer commonly used.

=== Currency symbol ===
The design of the Saudi riyal symbol based on official standards.

On February 20, 2025, the Saudi Central Bank announced the approval of the Saudi riyal symbol by King Salman. The symbol was designed by a committee composed of relevant official entities, including the Saudi Central Bank, the Ministry of Culture, the Ministry of Media, and the Saudi Standards, Metrology and Quality Organization.

Regarding the symbol, the Saudi Central Bank clarified that the design of the Saudi riyal symbol was inspired by Arabic calligraphy and consists solely of the Arabic letters of the word "Riyal," without any additional elements. Additionally, the Saudi Central Bank has published the precise standards and proportions for designing the riyal symbol and guidelines for its usage. The symbol was added to Unicode as U+20C1 ⃁ SAUDI RIYAL SIGN with the release of Unicode version 17.0 in September 2025, but will take some time to become included in major computer fonts (a .notdef symbol will be displayed until then).

=== Historical exchange rates ===
Historical exchange rate arrangements of Saudi Arabian currency since 1936
Date period	Arrangement	Remarks
1936 – 1948	1 SAR = 10.6918 g silver 20 SAR = 7.32238 g gold	
1948 – September 1948	1 SAR = 10.6918 g silver 65 SAR = 7.32238 g gold	
1948 – 1951	1 SAR = 10.6918 g silver	The gold sovereign coin was made legal tender in Saudi Arabia with an initial value of 62 riyals.
1951 – 21 October 1952	Informal fixed exchange rate (3 15/22 SAR = 1 USD)	Government begins stabilisation of exchange rate in relation to the U.S. dollar. Saudi Arabia adopted the gold standard. Implied exchange rate with the British sovereign coin was 40 riyals.
22 October 1952 – 1 November 1954	Fixed exchange rate (3 15/22 SAR = 1 USD)	Establishment of SAMA makes the fixed exchange rate official.
2 November 1954 – 1958	Fixed exchange rate (3.75 SAR = 1 USD)	Slight devaluation as announced by the finance minister.
1958 – 22 January 1959; 7 February 1959 – 7 January 1960	Dual exchange rate	A free market currency exchange was established. Official exchange rate was 3.75 riyals per U.S. dollar. A royal decree on 23 January 1959 briefly abolished the free market currency exchange.
8 January 1960 – 14 March 1975	Fixed exchange rate with USD	On 23 August 1971, the riyal was devalued by a sixth so that 4.50 SAR = 1 USD. Saudi Arabia did not follow the devaluation of the USD against gold, causing the exchange rate with respect to the USD to become 4.14475 riyals in December 1971 and 3.73027 riyals in February 1973. Following the 1970s energy crisis, the riyal was revalued to 3.55001 riyals per US dollar in August 1973.
From 15 March 1975	Anchor to special drawing rights	The currency was anchored to the IMF's special drawing rights at an initial exchange rate of 4.28255 riyals per SDR and was allowed to fluctuate within a band from September 1975 to July 1981. In practice, since 1986, the currency has been pegged to the US dollar at a rate of 3.745 (now 3.75) riyals per US dollar.

== Coins ==
In 1925, transitional copper coins for 1/4 and 1/2 qirsh (in some parts of the country, it is pronounced girsh) were minted in Mecca by King Abdulaziz. They were followed in 1926 by 1/4, 1/2, and 1 qirsh cupro-nickel pieces carrying the title "King of Hejaz and Sultan of Nejd".

In 1927, the royal title was changed to "King of Hejaz and Nejd and Dependencies", and coins were issued in denominations of 1/4, 1/2, and 1 qirsh in cupro-nickel, and 1/4, 1/2, and 1 riyal in silver.

In 1935, the first coins were issued in the name of Saudi Arabia. These were silver 1/4, 1/2, and 1 riyal coins, which were nearly 50% lighter than the previous issue. Cupro-nickel 1/4, 1/2, and 1 qirsh were also issued from 1937. In 1946 (AH 1365), many of the cupro-nickel coins were countermarked with the Arabic numerals 65, in what Krause and Mishler describe as "a move to break money changers' monopoly on small coins". Cupro-nickel 2 and 4 qirsh were introduced in 1957.

In 1963, the halala was introduced, and bronze 1 halala coins were issued. That was the only year they were struck. Cupro-nickel 5, 10, 25 and 50 halala followed in 1972, inscribed with their denomination in ghirsh or riyal (1, 2 qirsh, 1/4, 1/2 riyal). In 1976, cupro-nickel 1 riyal coins were introduced, which are also inscribed with the denomination 100 halala. Bimetallic 1 riyal coins, also marked 100 halala, were issued in 1999.

A new series of 1, 5, 10, 25, and 50 halalas and bimetallic 1 and 2 riyal coins was issued in 2016.

Current series (2016)
Image	Value	Diameter (mm)	Mass (g)	Composition	Edge	Obverse	Reverse	Issue
	1 halala	16.00	2.00	Nickel-plated steel	Milled	Emblem and ornamentation; Lettering (Arabic): Custodian of the Two Holy Mosques, Salman bin Abdulaziz al-Saud; year of issue (Hijri and Gregorian)	Value (Arabic and English); ornamentation	2016
	5 halalas	17.50	2.40	Nickel-plated steel	Smooth	Emblem and ornamentation; Lettering (Arabic): Custodian of the Two Holy Mosques, Salman bin Abdulaziz al-Saud; year of issue (Hijri and Gregorian)	Value (Arabic and English); ornamentation	2016
	10 halalas	19.00	2.80	Nickel-plated steel	Interrupted milling	Emblem and ornamentation; Lettering (Arabic): Custodian of the Two Holy Mosques, Salman bin Abdulaziz al-Saud; year of issue (Hijri and Gregorian)	Value (Arabic and English); ornamentation	2016
	25 halalas	21.50	4.10	Brass	Indented	Emblem and ornamentation; Lettering (Arabic): Custodian of the Two Holy Mosques, Salman bin Abdulaziz al-Saud; year of issue (Hijri and Gregorian)	Value (Arabic and English); ornamentation	2016
	50 halalas	24.00	5.20	Brass	Security	Emblem and ornamentation; Lettering (Arabic): Custodian of the Two Holy Mosques, Salman bin Abdulaziz al-Saud; year of issue (Hijri and Gregorian)	Value (Arabic and English); ornamentation	2016
	1 riyal	23.00	5.75	Outer: Brass	Smooth	Salman bin Abdulaziz; Emblem and ornamentation	Lettering (Arabic and English): Kingdom of Saudi Arabia, value; year of issue (Hijri and Gregorian); ornamentation	2016
	1 riyal	23.00	5.75	Inner: Cupronickel	Smooth	Salman bin Abdulaziz; Emblem and ornamentation	Lettering (Arabic and English): Kingdom of Saudi Arabia, value; year of issue (Hijri and Gregorian); ornamentation	2016
	2 riyals	25.00	6.70	Outer: Cupronickel	Interrupted milling	Abdulaziz bin Abdul Rahman; Emblem and ornamentation	Lettering (Arabic and English): Kingdom of Saudi Arabia, value; year of issue (Hijri and Gregorian); ornamentation	2016
	2 riyals	25.00	6.70	Inner: Brass-plated steel	Interrupted milling	Abdulaziz bin Abdul Rahman; Emblem and ornamentation	Lettering (Arabic and English): Kingdom of Saudi Arabia, value; year of issue (Hijri and Gregorian); ornamentation	2016

== Banknotes ==
The fourth series under King Fahd (1984–2007)

In 1953, the Saudi Arabian Monetary Agency (SAMA) began issuing Hajj Pilgrim Receipts for 10 riyals, with 1 and 5 riyals following in 1954 and 1956, respectively. These resembled banknotes and were initially intended for use by pilgrims who exchanged foreign currency for them. However, they became widely accepted in Saudi Arabia and largely replaced silver riyal coins in major financial transactions. Consequently, the Monetary Agency began issuing regular banknotes for 1, 5, 10, 50 and 100 riyals on 15 June 1961. The Pilgrim Receipts were withdrawn on 1 February 1965.

500 Riyal notes were introduced in 1983. 20 and 200 riyal banknotes were issued in 2000 to commemorate the centenary of the founding of what became the Kingdom of Saudi Arabia. The 5th series of banknotes bearing the face of King Abdullah were issued in 2007. The 6th series of banknotes bearing the face of King Salman were issued on 14/3/1438H (13/12/2016).

=== Fifth series ===
The fifth series under King Abdullah (2007–2016)

On May 20, 2007, "the Saudi Arabian Monetary Agency, pursuant to article (4) of the Saudi Currency Law, issued under the Royal Decree No. (6) and dated 1/7/1379H." announced the fifth domination of the Saudi riyal that features King Abdullah's picture on all notes except the 500 riyals, which features King Abdulaziz. The 100 and 50 riyal notes were released on May 21, 2007. The 10 and 5 riyal notes followed in June 2007, then the 500 riyal followed in September 2007, and finally the 1 riyal note completed the series in December 2007.

It is expected by the SAMA that the fourth (current) series will take approximately two years to phase out, although a complete removal of the current series require more than two years since the fourth series has been in circulation for well over 25 years. The fourth series which feature King Fahd's picture will remain legal tender under the Saudi Arabian monetary law. The new series have the latest and most advanced security system to prevent from counterfeiting and other similar activities.

Fifth series (2007)
Image		Value	Dimensions (mm)	Main colour	Description		First printing	Issue
Obverse	Reverse	Value	Dimensions (mm)	Main colour	Obverse	Reverse	First printing	Issue
		1 riyal	133 × 63	Light green	Abdullah bin Abdulaziz; 7th century gold dinar coin	SAMA headquarters	2007	31 December 2007
		5 riyals	145 × 66	Violet	Abdullah bin Abdulaziz; Ras Tanura oil refinery	Jubail Port	2007	16 July 2007
		10 riyals	150 × 68	Brown	Abdullah bin Abdulaziz; Murabba Palace	King Abdulaziz Historical Center	2007	16 July 2007
		50 riyals	155 × 70	Dark green	Abdullah bin Abdulaziz; Dome of the Rock, Jerusalem	Al-Aqsa Mosque, Jerusalem	2007	21 May 2007
		100 riyals	160 × 72	Red	Abdullah bin Abdulaziz; Green Dome	Prophet's Mosque	2007	21 May 2007
		500 riyals	166 × 74	Blue	Abdulaziz bin Abdul Rahman; Kaaba	Masjid al-Haram	2007	17 September 2007

=== Sixth series ===
The newly renamed Saudi Arabian Monetary Authority unveiled a new family of banknotes with the portrait of King Salman on banknotes from 5 to 100 riyals, with a portrait of King Abdulaziz Al Saud on the 500 riyals banknote. On the 4 October 2020, the Saudi Arabian Monetary Authority announced the first polymer note to be used in Saudi Arabia, being the 5 riyals note, to replace the current paper banknote, without any announcement on the other banknotes. The banknote was said to feature more environmentally friendly materials and additional security features, in addition to a much longer lifespan.

The commemorative 20 riyal note, released in 2020 to commemorate the G20, attracted attention on release, as its reverse depicts the disputed territory of Jammu and Kashmir as a separate nation from India. While this design feature was met with criticism in most of India, it was received favourably by people in Kashmir and on social media, as it was viewed as a tacit form of approval of the region's separatism movement.

Sixth series (2016)
Image	Value	Dimensions (mm)	Main colour	Description		First printing	Issue
Image	Value	Dimensions (mm)	Main colour	Obverse	Reverse	First printing	Issue
	5 riyals	145 × 66	Purple	Salman bin Abdulaziz; Shaybah oil refinery	Flowers	2016	26 December 2016 (paper)
	5 riyals	145 × 66	Purple	Salman bin Abdulaziz; Shaybah oil refinery	Flowers	2020	4 October 2020 (polymer)
	10 riyals	150 × 68	Brown	Salman bin Abdulaziz; Murabba Palace	King Abdullah Financial District	2016	26 December 2016
	50 riyals	155 × 70	Green	Salman bin Abdulaziz; Dome of the Rock, Jerusalem	Qibli Mosque (part of Al-Aqsa mosque), Jerusalem	2016	26 December 2016
	100 riyals	160 × 72	Red	Salman bin Abdulaziz; Green Dome	Prophet's Mosque, Medina	2016	26 December 2016
	500 riyals	166 × 74	Blue	Abdulaziz bin Abdul Rahman; Kaaba	Masjid al-Haram, Mecca	2016	26 December 2016
Commemorative issues
	20 riyals	152 × 69	Olive green and grey	Salman bin Abdulaziz; G20 logo	World map with G20 members highlighted; star indicating the location of Saudi Arabia	2020	25 October 2020
	200 riyals	163 × 73	Grey	Abdulaziz bin Abdul Rahman; Vision 2030 logo	Al-Hukm Palace	2021	1 April 2021

== Fixed exchange rate ==
In June 1986, the riyal was officially pegged to the IMF's special drawing rights (SDRs). In practice, it is fixed at 1 U.S. dollar = 3.75 riyals, which translates to approximately 1 riyal = 0.266667 dollar. This rate was made official on January 1, 2003.

The riyal briefly rose to a 20-year high after the US Federal Reserve cut interest rates on September 18, 2007, and the SAMA chose not to follow suit, partially due to concerns about the inflationary effects low interest rates and a lower value for the riyal. The riyal returned to its peg against the U.S. dollar in early December 2007.

Current SAR exchange rates
From Google Finance:	AUD CAD CHF CNY EUR GBP HKD JPY USD INR JPY
From Yahoo! Finance:	AUD CAD CHF CNY EUR GBP HKD JPY USD INR JPY
From XE.com:	AUD CAD CHF CNY EUR GBP HKD JPY USD INR JPY
From OANDA:	AUD CAD CHF CNY EUR GBP HKD JPY USD INR JPY

== Proposed currency union ==
Saudi Arabia is a member of the Gulf Cooperation Council, which planned a Currency union with a single currency by 2010. However, all GCC countries operate with their own currency so far.

== See also ==
- Saudi riyal sign
- Banks in Saudi Arabia
- Economy of Saudi Arabia
