= Hejaz riyal =

Currency of Hejaz from 1916 to 1925

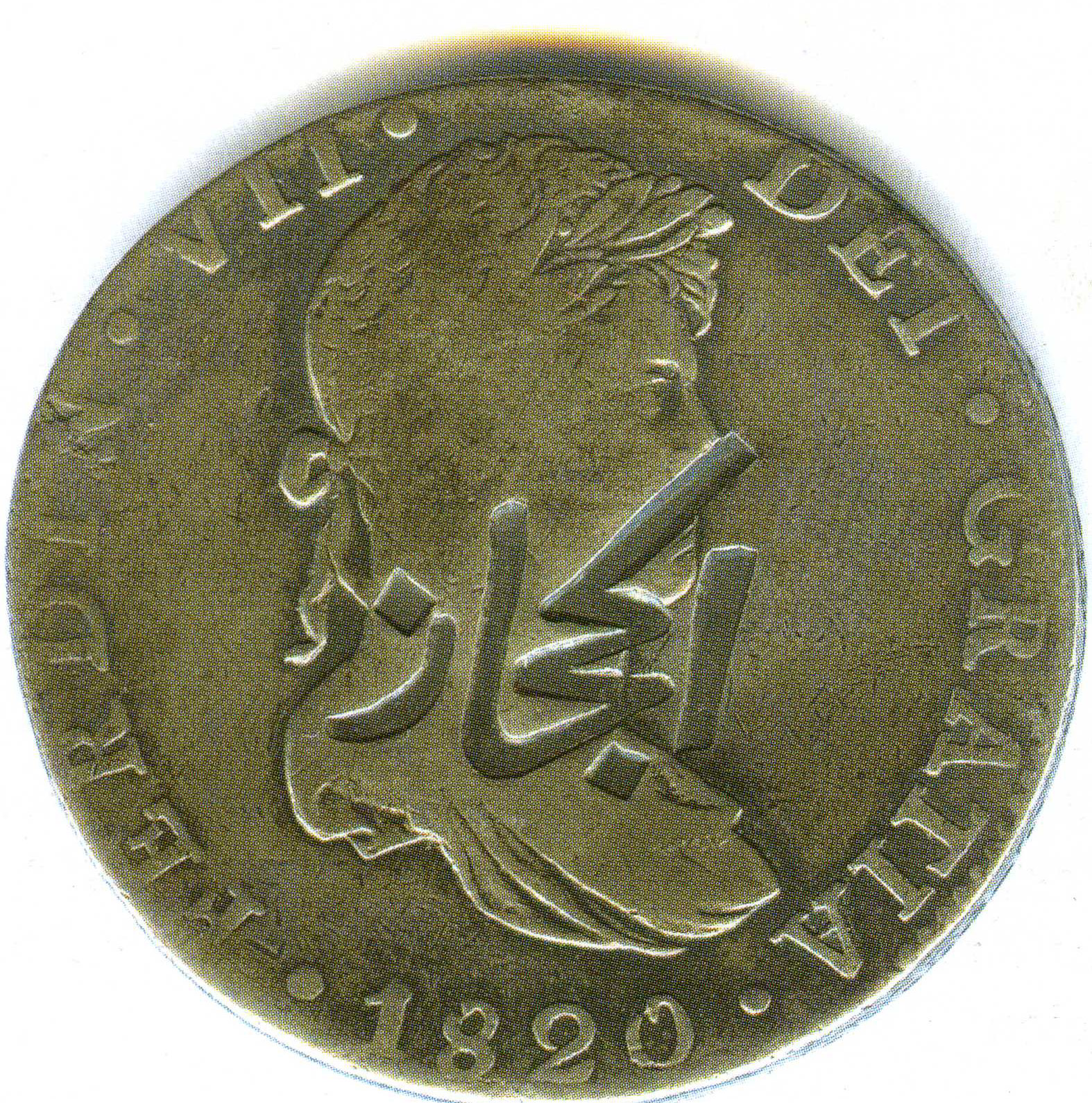
A Spanish Real used in Hejaz with a countermark

The riyal (Arabic: ريال riyāl) was the currency of the Kingdom of Hejaz between 1916 and 1925. It was subdivided into 20 qirsh (Arabic: قرش). The riyal was a silver coin the same weight as the Ottoman 20 kuruş coin but was minted in .917 fineness rather than .830 fineness. The Hejaz riyal was replaced by the Hejaz and Nejd riyal in 1925 at par.

== Coins ==
In 1916, bronze coins were issued for 1/8, 1/4, 1/2 and 1 qirsh together with silver 5, 10 and 20 qirsh. Gold 1 dinar coins were also minted. Turkish and Egyptian coins and Maria Theresa thaler, were countermarked for use in Hejaz, with the name of the kingdom in Arabic: الحجاز.
