= Brazilian currency =

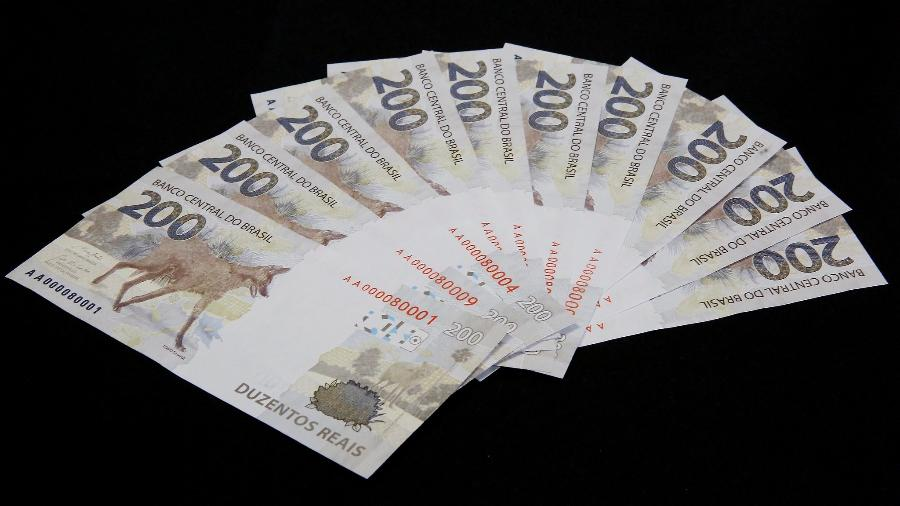
A collection of R$200 banknotes

There have been nine different units of Brazilian currency in sequence over the country's history: the Portuguese and first Brazilian real (plural réis); 3 types of cruzeiros; the cruzado; the novo cruzado; the cruzeiro real, and since 1994, the second incarnation of the Brazilian real (plural reais), with the symbol R$ and the ISO code BRL.

== Historical currencies ==
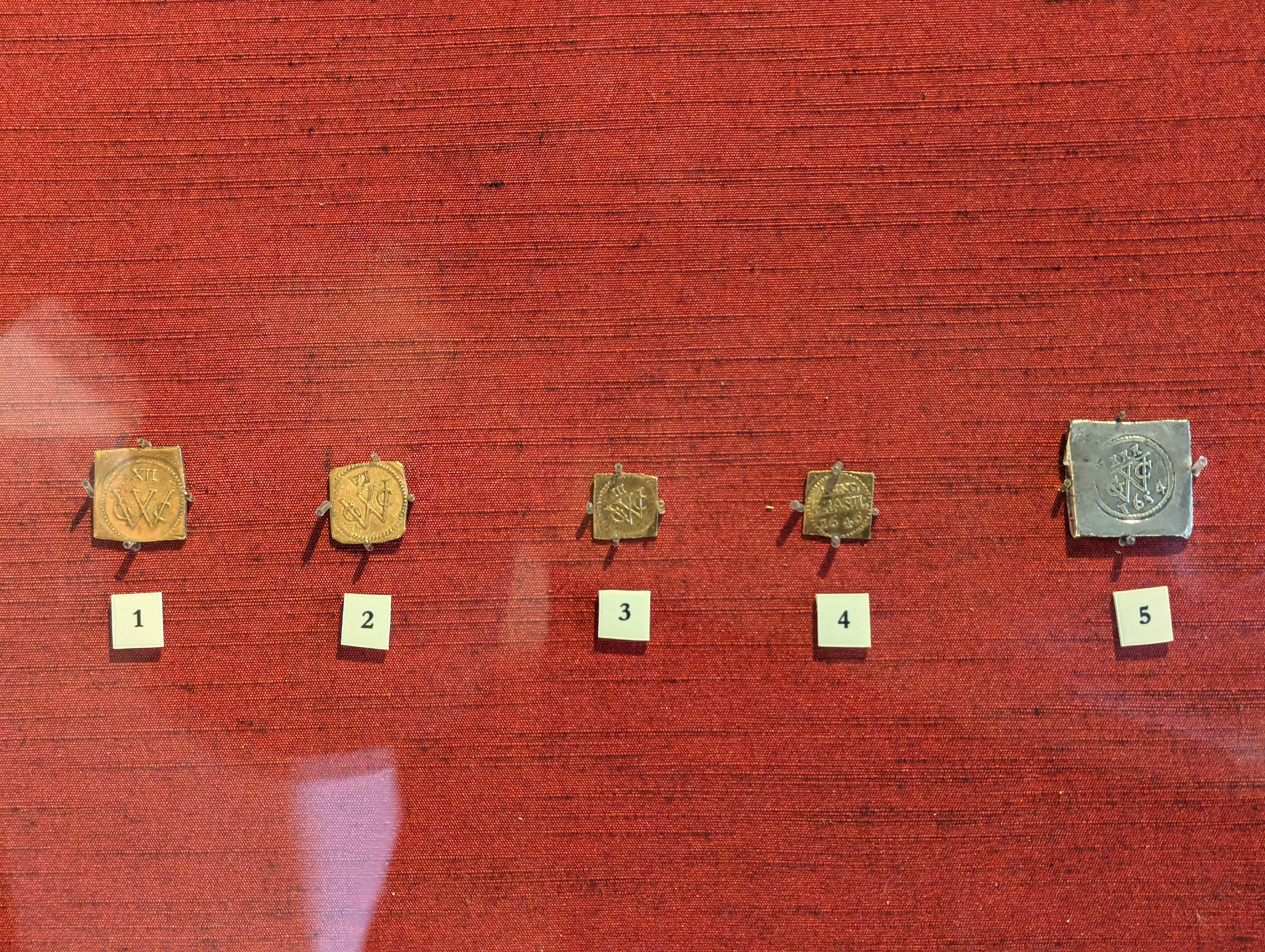
Dutch Brazil's emergency coinage were the first ever coins minted in Brazilian territory, and the first coins with the name "Brasil" inscribed.

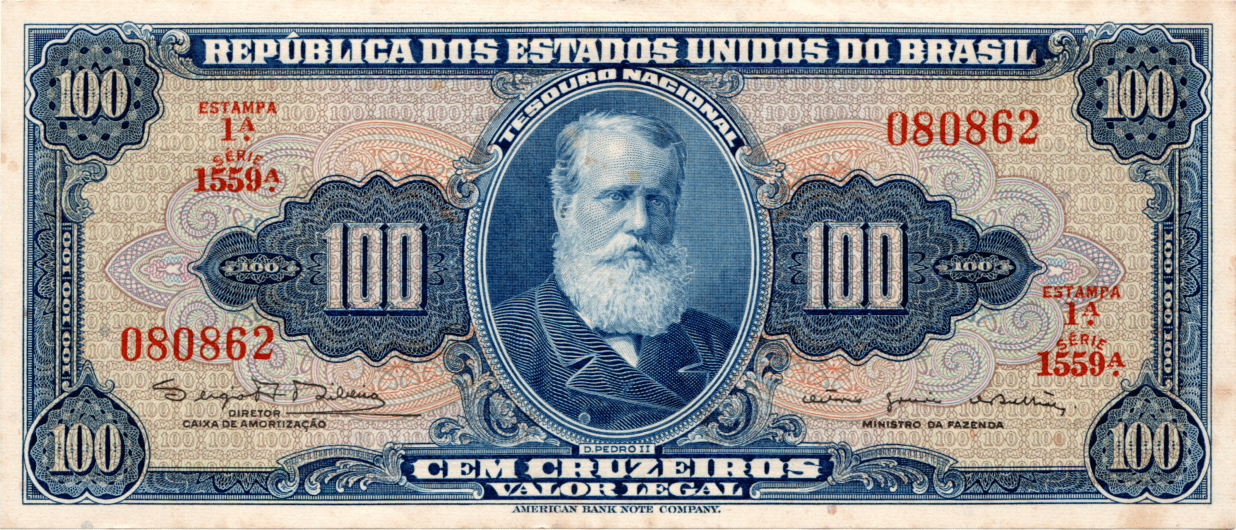
₢$100 (100 cruzeiros — 1st cruzeiro)

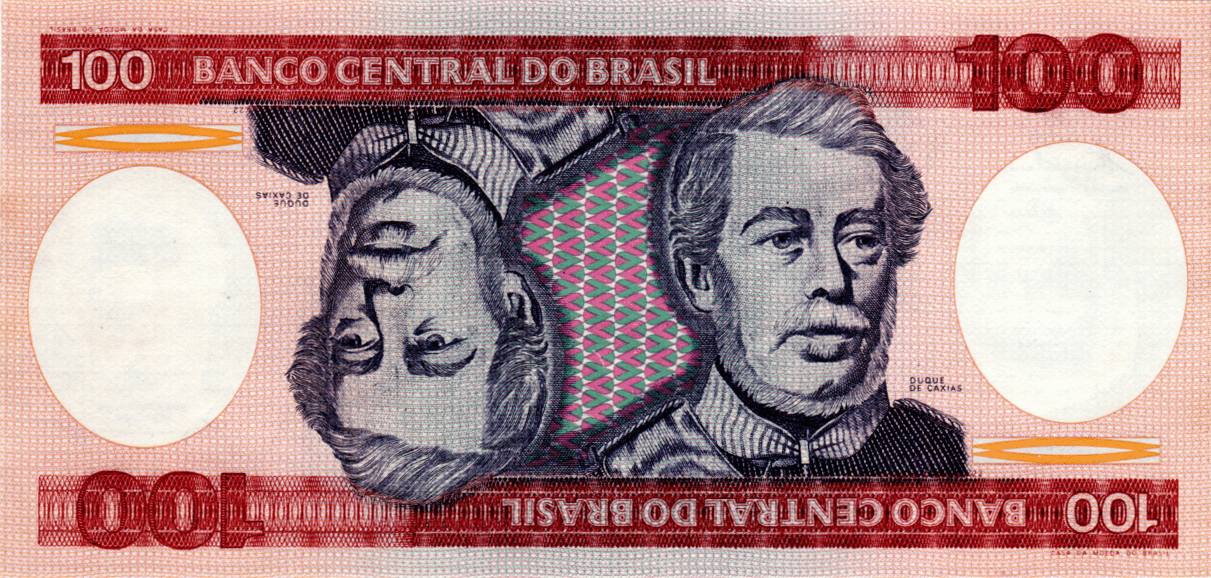
NCr$100 (100 cruzeiros) (2nd cruzeiro - second family, issued between 1981 and 1984)

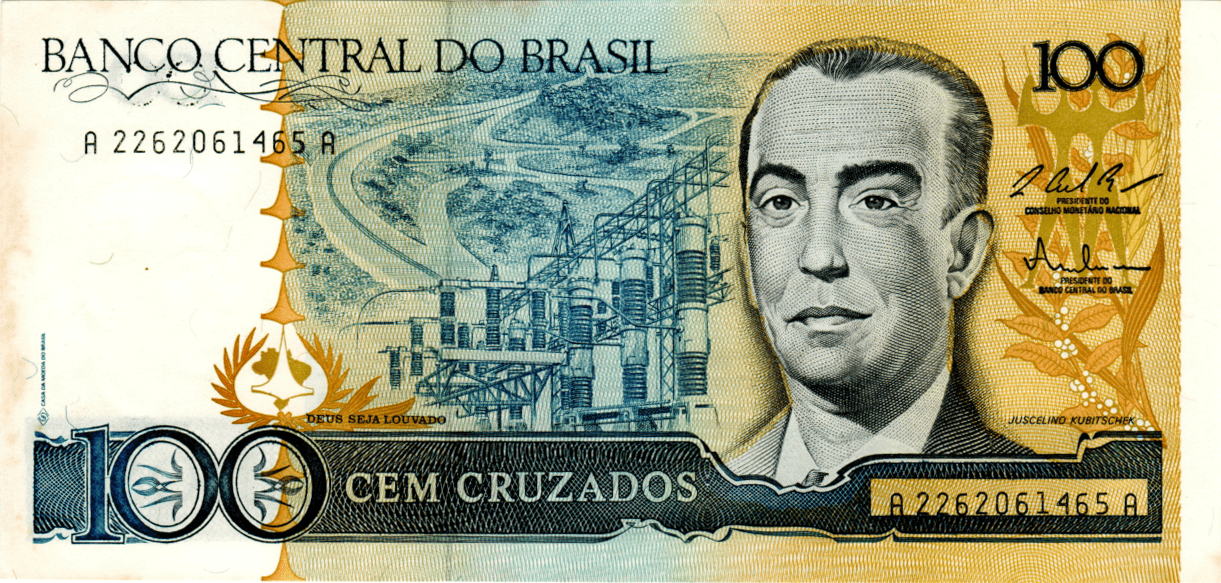
Cz$100 (100 cruzados)

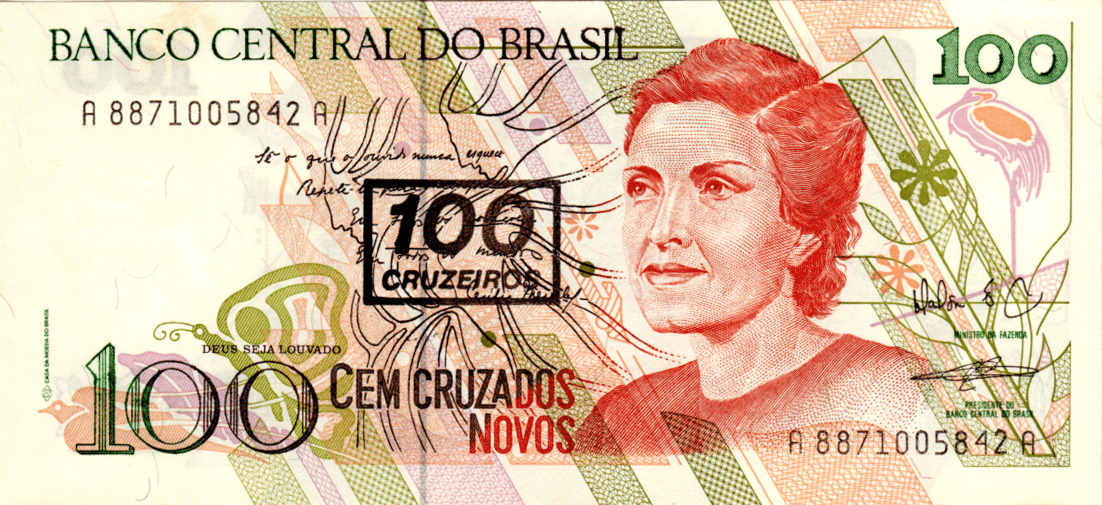
NCz$100 (100 cruzados novos, overstamped Cr$100 note)

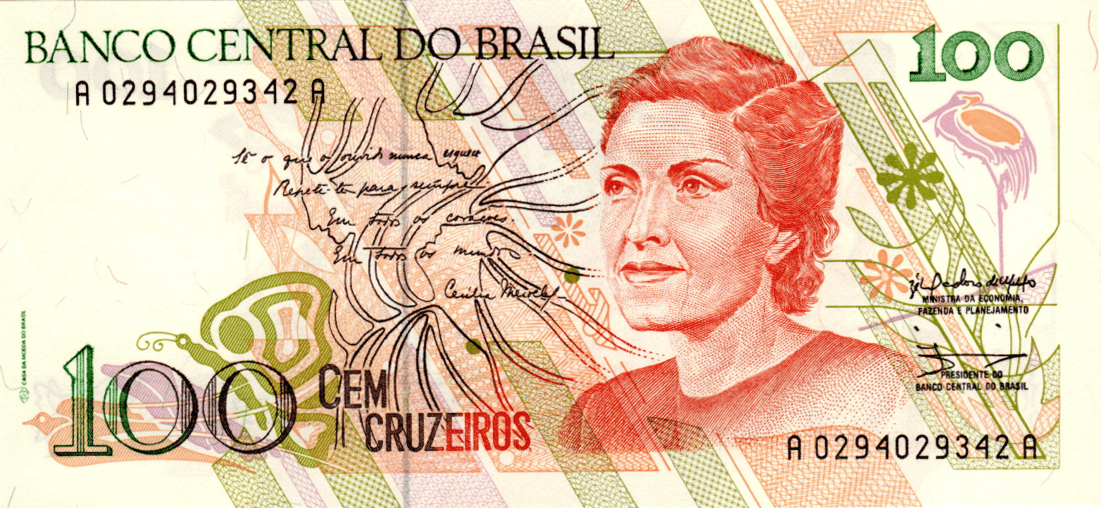
Cr$100 (100 cruzeiros – 3rd cruzeiro)

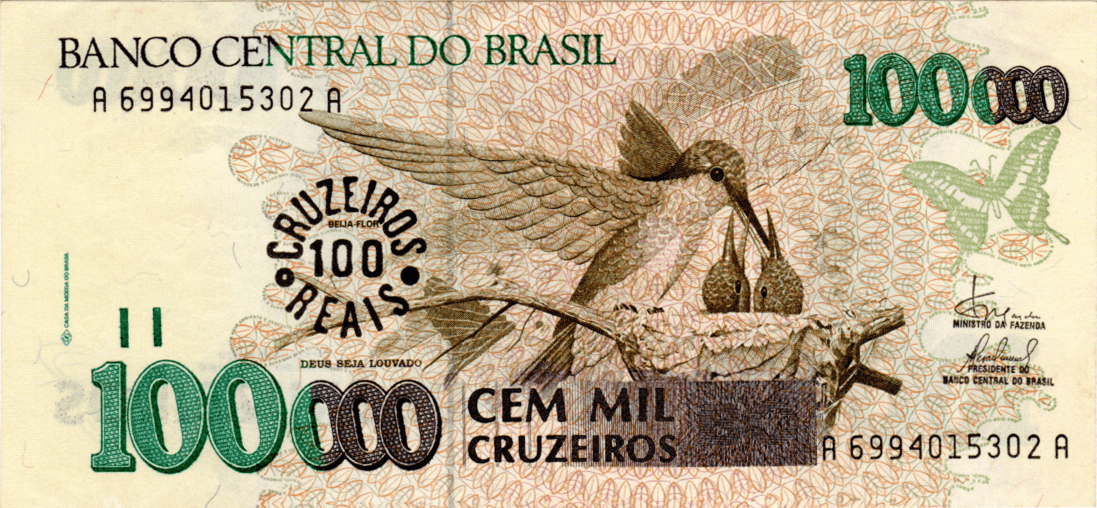
CR$100 (100 cruzeiros reais, overstamped Cr$100,000 note)

While Portuguese settlers used Réis coins from Portugal, Dutch settlers occupying Northeastern Brazil used guilders. In 1645, the colony faced an economic crisis and, with a lack of financial support from the mainland and the need to pay for troops fighting Portuguese settlers, the local Dutch administration struck the first ever coins in Brazilian land, repurposing gold coming from the Dutch Guinea. A few years later, in 1654, in an increasingly worse situation, coins were again minted to pay off debt, but this time with silver from the administrators' own coffers.

Historical currencies of Brazil
Introduction	Withdrawal	Duration	Name	Symbol	ISO	Conversion	Notes
—	—	—	Portuguese Real	Rs (Note: Cover from the Brazilian magazine O Cruzeiro ("The Southern Cross") from 1928, showing the price as "1", that is, 1000 réis.)		N/A	In the Portuguese Empire and in Brazil until 1942, the symbol "Rs" or "Rs." was prefixed to the amount, and additionally the double-stroke dollar sign "" (cifrão) was used as a thousands separator in amounts greater than 999 réis. If the last three digits were "000", they would sometimes be omitted. If the cifrão was present, the "Rs." was commonly omitted too. Thus "Rs 123500" meant "123 500 réis", and "123" meant "123 000" réis.
12 October 1822		120y 20d	Real (old, pl. réis)	Rs		= 1 Portuguese real	There isn't an official or exact date for the transition from Portuguese réis to Brazilian réis. Brazil became independent on 12 October 1822, and the first coin minted in the new country, known as the coronation piece, was minted in that same year (1822), exclusively tn Brazil, to commemorate Pedro I's coronation. While the Portuguese real may have continued to be legal tender in Brazil, the Brazilian real became a separate currency at that point.
1 November 1942		24y 3m 12d	Cruzeiro (first)	Cr$ (Note: Detail from cover of an Italian magazine bought in Brazil in 1960, stamped with the price tag "Cr$ 13,00" using the double-stroke dollar sign. The official symbol of the first cruzeiro, as per the 1942 decree, was "Cr $" — with two separate letters, a space, and a single-stroke dollar sign. However, the space was often omitted, and the two-stroke dollar sign "", previously used for the real, was often used. Also, some typewriters and typefaces had a "₢" ligature that was occasionally used in place of the "Cr".)		= 1,000 réis	
13 February 1967	30 June 1972	3y 3m 2d	Cruzeiro novo	NCr$		= 1,000 cruzeiros	
15 May 1970		15y 9m 12d	Cruzeiro (second)	Cr$	BRB	= 1 cruzeiro novo	Change of name of the cruzeiro novo. Not a new currency.
27 February 1986		2y 10m 19d	Cruzado	Cz$	BRC	= 1,000 cruzeiros	
15 January 1989		1y 2m 1d	Cruzado novo	NCz$	BRN	= 1,000 cruzados	
16 March 1990		3y 4m 15d	Cruzeiro (third)	Cr$	BRE	= 1 cruzado novo	
1 August 1993		11m	Cruzeiro real	CR$	BRR	= 1,000 cruzeiros	
1 July 1994	(still in use)	32y 1m 25d	Real (new, pl. reais)	R$	BRL	= 2,750 cruzeiros reais	

Note that the dates of various currencies overlap. For example, the cruzeiro novo was still legal tender for 2 years after the second cruzeiro was introduced.

Not considering inflation, one modern Brazilian real is equivalent to 2,750,000,000,000,000,000 times the old real, that is, 2.75×10^{18} (2.75 quintillion) réis.

Before leaving Brazil in 1821, the Portuguese royal court withdrew all the bullion currency it could from banks in exchange for what would become worthless bond notes;

== Banknotes ==
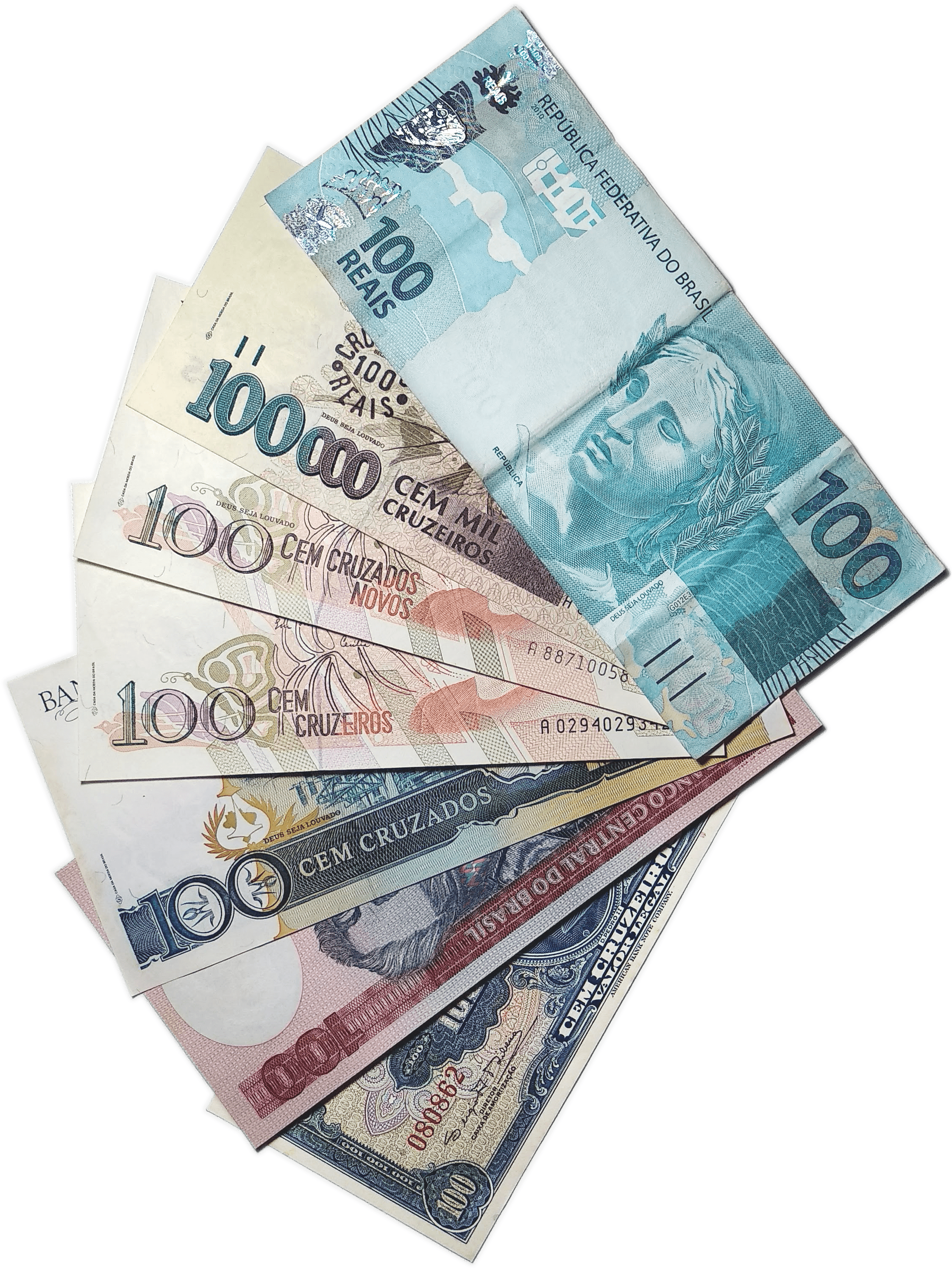
Every historical Brazilian banknote with a face value of 100

The following tables indicate what banknotes were present in each of the currencies of Brazil, except for the provisional issues of banknotes to exchange gold in the colonial period:

Legend
Symbol	Meaning
Yes	Currency had a banknote with this face value
No	Currency did not have a banknote with this face value
Maybe	Currency had legal tender with this face value in the form of an overstamped banknote from the previous currency
No	Currency had a project to launch a banknote, but it never came into circulation

_{Currency}\^{Face value}	0.01	0.05	0.10	0.50	1	2	5	10	20	50	100	200	500	1K	2K	5K	10K	20K	30K	50K	100K	200K	500K	1 million	5 million
Real (old)	No	No	No	No	No	No	No	No	No	No	No	No	Yes	Yes	Yes	Yes	Yes	Yes	Yes	Yes	Yes	Yes	Yes	Yes	No
Cruzeiro (1st)	No	No	No	No	Yes	Yes	Yes	Yes	Yes	Yes	Yes	Yes	Yes	Yes	No	Yes	Yes	No	No	No	No	No	No	No	No
Cruzeiro novo	Maybe	Maybe	Maybe	Maybe	Maybe	No	Maybe	Maybe	No	No	No	No	No	No	No	No	No	No	No	No	No	No	No	No	No
Cruzeiro (2nd)	No	No	No	No	Yes	No	Yes	Yes	No	Yes	Yes	Yes	Yes	Yes	No	Yes	Yes	No	No	Yes	Yes	No	No	No	No
Cruzado	No	No	No	No	No	No	No	Yes	No	Yes	Yes	No	Yes	Yes	No	Yes	Yes	No	No	No	No	No	No	No	No
Cruzado novo	No	No	No	No	Maybe	No	Maybe	Maybe	No	Yes	Yes	Yes	Yes	No	No	No	No	No	No	No	No	No	No	No	No
Cruzeiro (3rd)	No	No	No	No	No	No	No	No	No	Maybe	Yes	Yes	Yes	Yes	No	Yes	Yes	No	No	Yes	Yes	No	Yes	No	No
Cruzeiro real	No	No	No	No	No	No	No	No	No	Maybe	Maybe	No	Maybe	Yes	No	Yes	No	No	No	Yes	No	No	No	No	No
Real (new)	No	No	No	No	Yes	Yes	Yes	Yes	Yes	Yes	Yes	Yes	No	No	No	No	No	No	No	No	No	No	No	No	No

No single face value has been present in all historical Brazilian banknotes. For example, a face value of 100 is missing from the old real (as its lowest denomination of banknote is 500 Rs) and from the provisional cruzeiro novo (as its only banknotes were overstamps of the first cruzeiro, and the highest denomination was NCr$10). It is, however, present in all the other currencies.

== Coins ==
The following tables indicate what coins were present in each of the currencies of Brazil, with the exception of réis: (Note: The following face values of réis coins were minted: 5, 10, 20, 37.5, 40, 50, 75, 80, 100, 160, 200, 300, 320, 400, 500, 640, 800, 960, 1000, 1200, 2000, 4000, 5000, 6400, 10,000 and 20,000)

Legend
Symbol	Meaning
Yes	Currency had a circulating coin with this face value
No	Currency did not have any coin with this face value
Yes	Currency had legal tender with this face value in the form of a non-circulating commemorative coin
Maybe	The currency took advantage of coins of the previous standard was issued coins in such values
No	Currency had a project to launch a coin, but it never came into circulation

_{Currency}\^{Face value}
Cruzeiro (1st)
Cruzeiro novo
Cruzeiro (2nd)
Cruzado
Cruzado novo
Cruzeiro (3rd)
Cruzeiro real
Real (new)

0.01	0.02	0.05	0.10	0.20	0.25	0.50	1	2	3	4	5	10	20	50	100	200	300	500	1,000	2,000	5,000
No	No	No	Yes	Yes	No	Yes	Yes	Yes	No	No	Yes	Yes	Yes	Yes	No	No	No	No	No	No	No
Yes	Yes	Yes	Yes	Yes	No	Yes	No	No	No	No	No	No	No	No	No	No	No	No	No	No	No
Maybe	Maybe	Maybe	Maybe	Maybe	No	Maybe	Yes	No	No	No	Yes	Yes	Yes	Yes	Yes	Yes	Yes	Yes	No	No	No
Yes	No	Yes	Yes	Yes	No	Yes	Yes	No	No	No	Yes	Yes	No	No	Yes (Note: Although the 100-cruzado coin issued in 1988 was issued for "common circulation", its coinage in three 200,000-piece models was too small for circulation purposes. The silver 20-cruzeiro coin issued in 1972 had a coinage almost as large as the sum of the coins of the three 100-cruzado models issued in 1988 and did not serve the common circulation.)	No	No	No	No	No	No
Yes	No	Yes	Yes	No	No	Yes	Yes	No	No	No	No	No	No	No	No	Yes	No	No	No	No	No
Maybe	No	Maybe	Maybe	No	No	Maybe	Yes	No	No	No	Yes	Yes	No	Yes	Yes	No	No	Yes	Yes	Yes	Yes
No	No	No	No	No	No	No	No	No	No	No	Yes	Yes	No	Yes	Yes	No	No	No	No	No	No
Yes	No	Yes	Yes	No	Yes	Yes	Yes	Yes	Yes	Yes	Yes	Yes	Yes	No	No	No	No	No	No	No	No

No single face value has been present in all historical Brazilian coins. For example, a face value of 1 is missing from the cruzeiro novo (as its highest denomination of coin is NCr$0.50 because it's a transitory monetary standard between the cruzeiro issued between 1942 and 1967 and the cruzeiro issued after 1970) and from the old real and the cruzeiro real (as their lowest denomination of coin is 5 Rs and CR$5, respectively). It is, however, present in all the other currencies:

Historical Brazilian coins with face value of 1

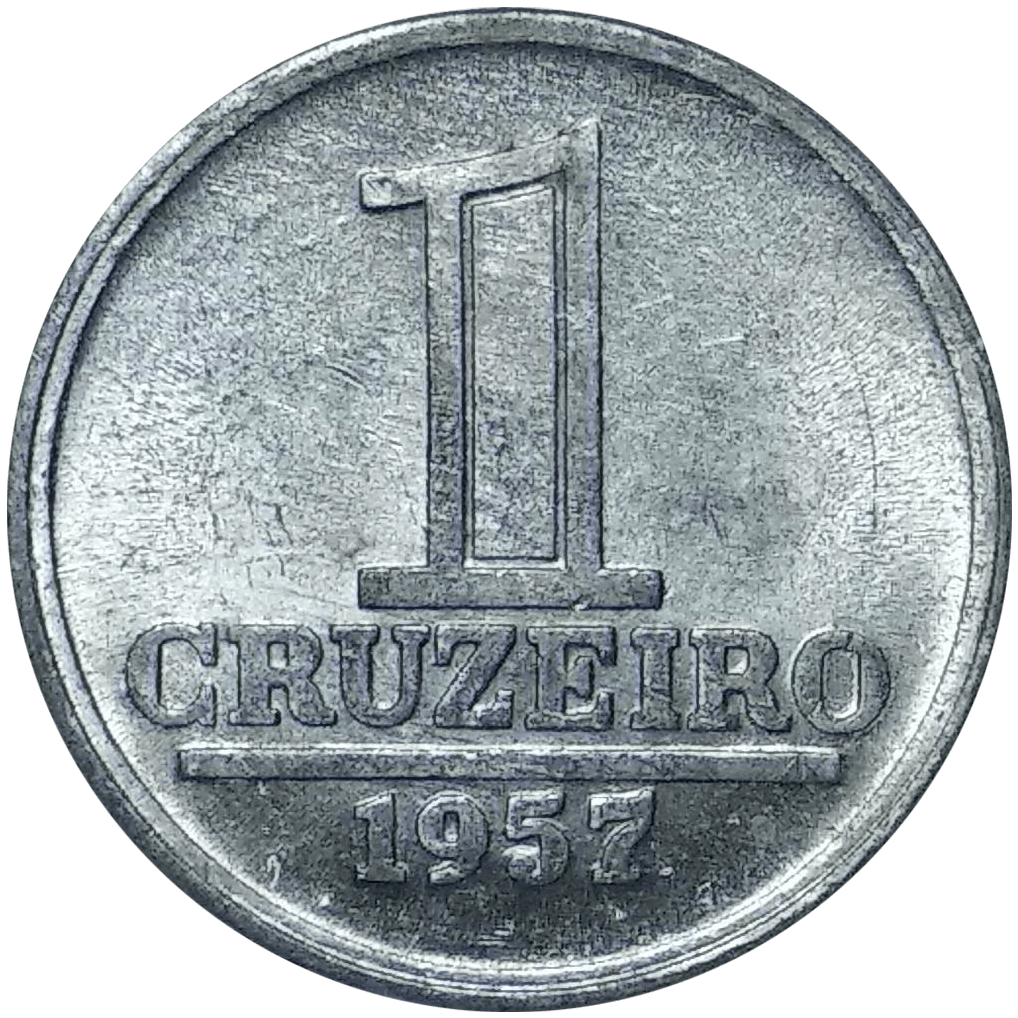
₢$1 (first cruzeiro/aluminium coinage 1957-1961)

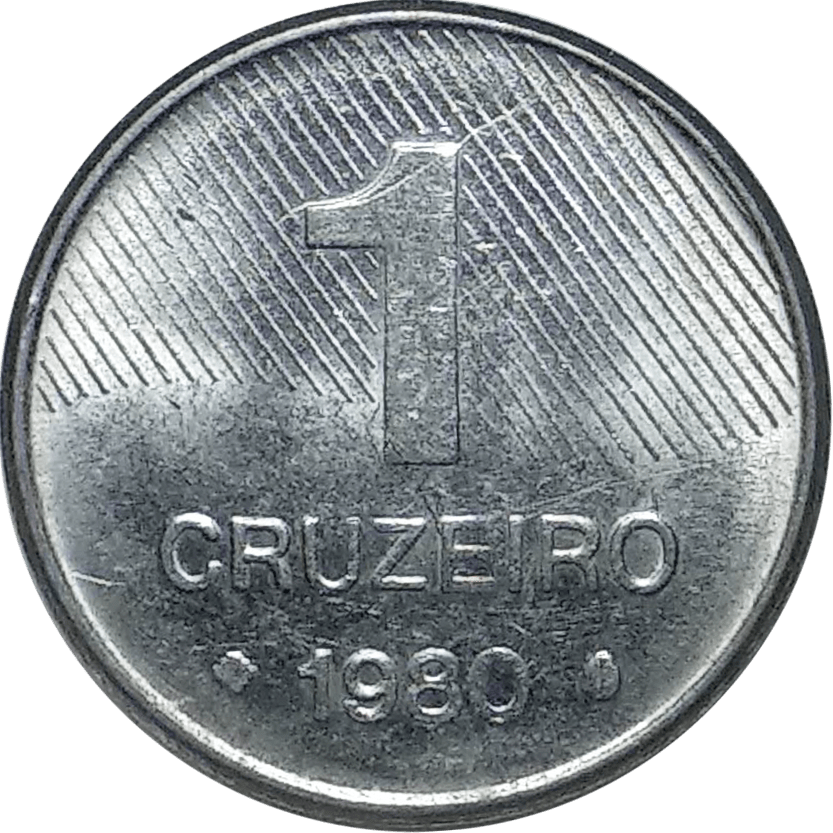
NCr$1 (second cruzeiro/second family 1979-1984)

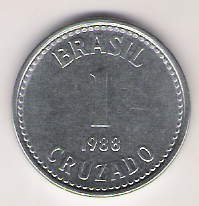
Cz$1

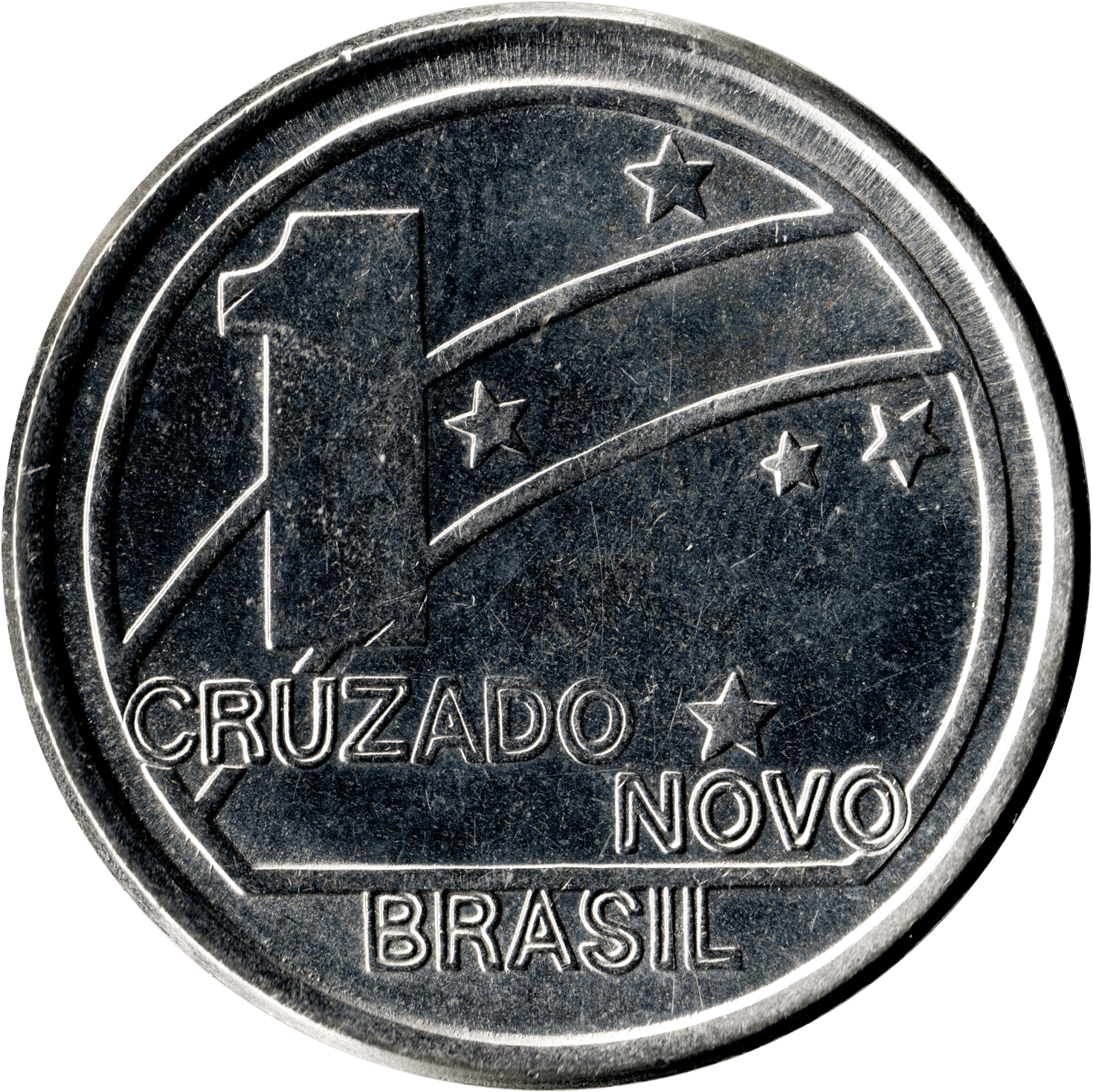
NCz$1

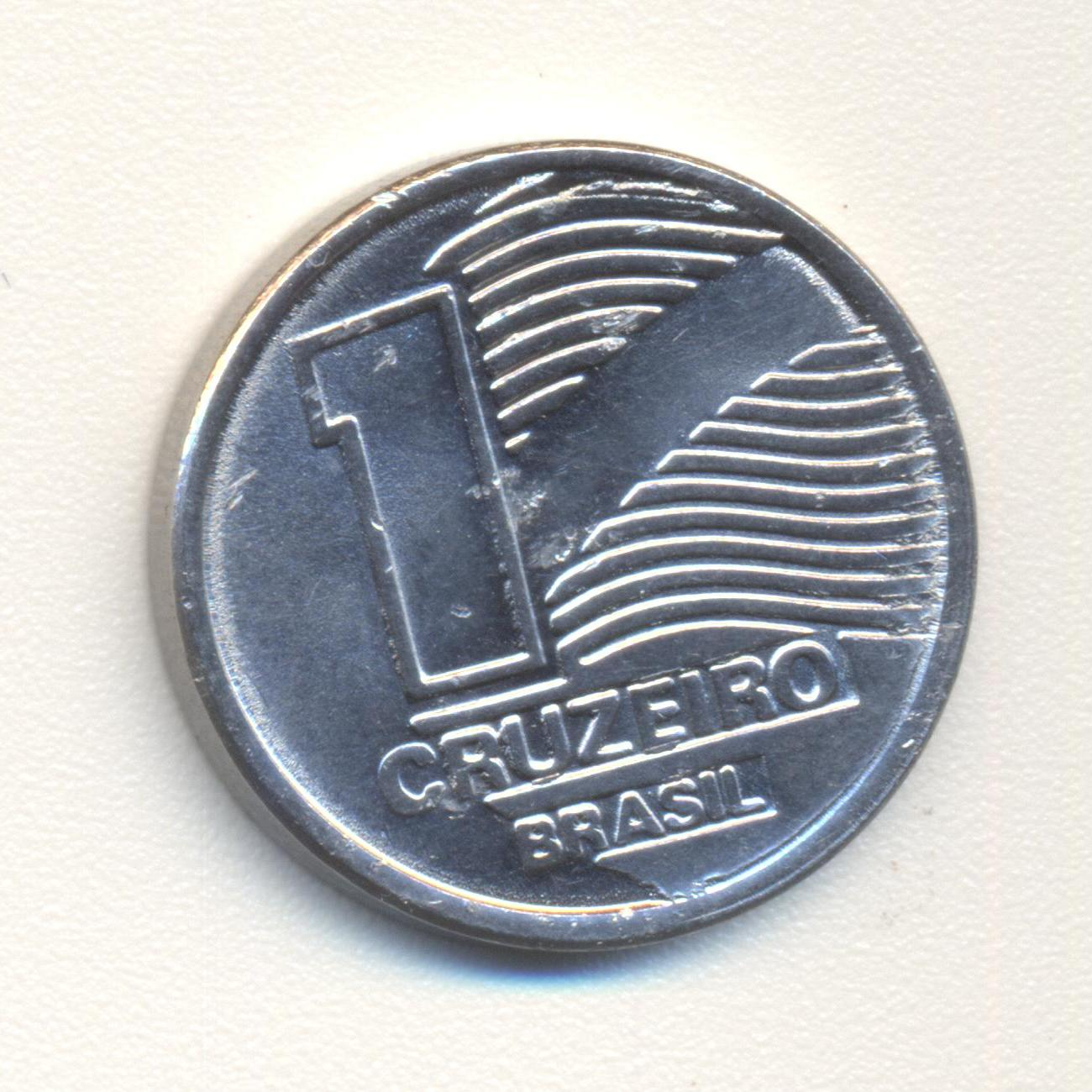
Cr$1 (third cruzeiro - 1990)

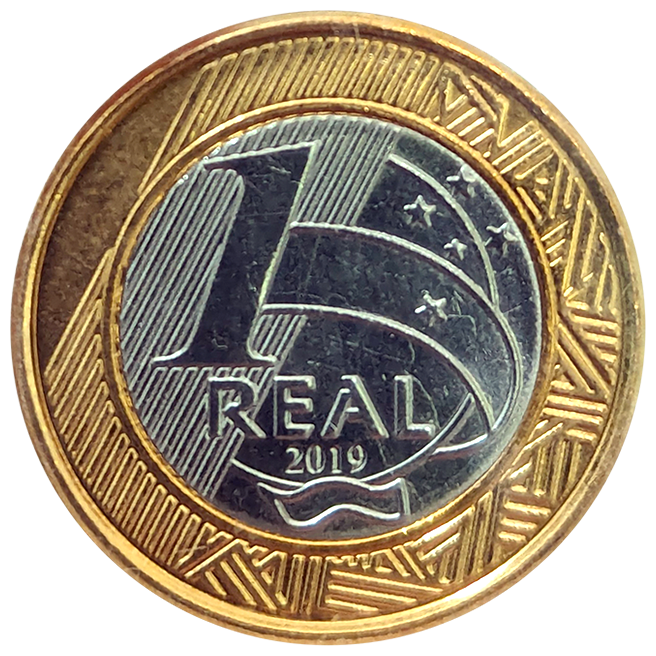
R$1

== See also ==
- Paulista currency
- Inflation in Brazil
