= Ruble sign =

Currency sign

₽

Ruble sign
- In Unicode: U+20BD ₽ RUBLE SIGN

Currency
- Currency: Russian ruble

Different from
- Different from: U+0584 ք ARMENIAN SMALL LETTER KEH; U+20B1 ₱ PESO SIGN (Philippines); U+2CE8 ⳨ COPTIC SYMBOL TAU RO (staurogram); U+0420 Р CYRILLIC CAPITAL LETTER ER; U+0050 P LATIN CAPITAL LETTER P

The ruble sign, ₽, is the currency sign used for the Russian ruble, the official currency of Russia. It is based on the Cyrillic capital letter "Р", the initial letter of the word ruble (рубль). The design was approved by the Central Bank of Russia on 11 December 2013.

In Russia, the ruble sign follows the value and is separated by a space; outside Russia, it may be written without a space and precede the value (e.g., 100 ₽ or ₽100).

== History ==
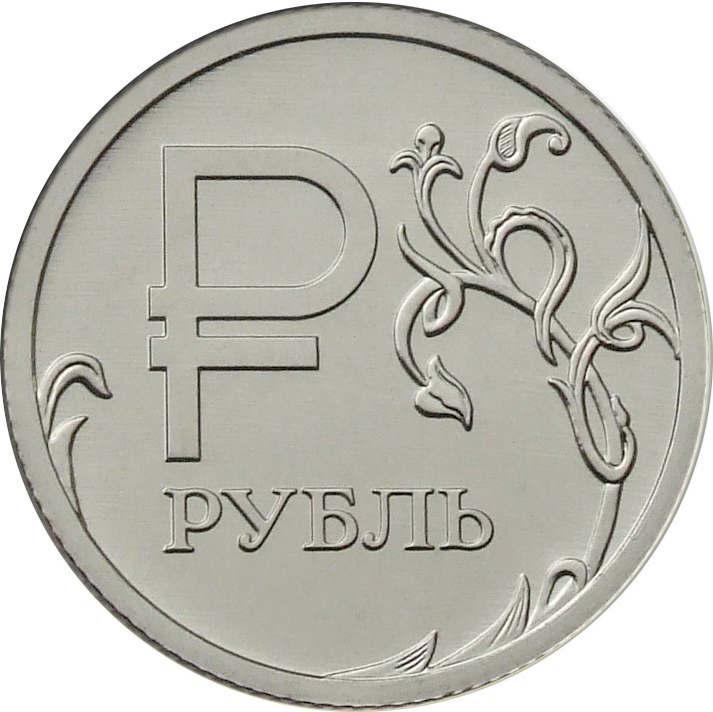
A Russian one ruble coin from a special series featuring the ruble sign

During the Russian Empire, a ruble currency symbol was in use between the 16th and 18th centuries. It consisted of the Cyrillic letters ⟨Р⟩ (rotated 90° counter-clockwise) and ⟨У⟩ placed above it, and was written above the numerical amount. The symbol fell out of use during the 19th century. In the later Russian Empire and the Soviet Union, no official currency symbol was used, and abbreviations such as the Latin letter ⟨R⟩ and "руб." remained in use.

In 1999, the newspaper Kommersant, in cooperation with the Portfolio Club, organised a "Ruble Sign" competition initiated by Pyotr Bankov. The results of this contest later served as a reference point for subsequent design efforts. Several further competitions were held, although the proposed symbols remained broadly similar in appearance.

On 1 July 2007, the Federal Statute on the Central Bank of the Russian Federation came into force, providing for the introduction of a graphic symbol for the ruble. Following this, the Central Bank of Russia organised a public selection process, presenting 13 design proposals. Among the shortlisted options was "РР", an abbreviation of Российский рубль ("Russian ruble"), which received preliminary approval.

On 1 August 2007, a separate design featuring a Cyrillic letter ⟨Р⟩ with a horizontal stroke, proposed by a group of designers, including Art. Lebedev Studio, began circulating unofficially. This design, visually similar to the Armenian letter ⟨ք⟩, gained wider public recognition. On 11 December 2013, the Central Bank of Russia formally approved this design as the official ruble symbol, following a public vote in which it received 61% of more than 284,000 votes.

On 21 January 2014, the Russian National Body of ISO/IEC JTC 1 submitted an application for the ruble symbol’s inclusion in The Unicode Standard. A separate proposal was submitted by Michael Everson on 4 February 2014. The symbol was subsequently approved for inclusion in Unicode 7.0 and encoded as U+20BD ₽ RUBLE SIGN in the Currency Symbols block.

== Design ==
The currency symbol consists of a capital letter ⟨Р⟩ crossed by two horizontal bars, one extending from the lower part of the bowl of the "Р" and a second parallel bar positioned at a distance equal to one stroke width below the first bar.

The design stems from principles of simplicity, typographic clarity, and ease of use. These included recognisability in both Latin and Cyrillic scripts, legibility at small sizes, ease of handwriting, and suitability as a single-grapheme symbol for use in tabular composition. It was also designed to be font-independent, to maintain consistent visual weight, and to align in width with numerals such as zero. The design aimed to ensure both domestic recognisability and international comprehensibility.

== Other uses ==
The currency symbol used in the Pokémon franchise resembles the ruble sign but features two horizontal bars ( ). The now-defunct Venezuelan cryptocurrency, Petro, also used a similar symbol with a more rounded upper curve ( ) until its liquidation in 2024.
