= Paulista currency =

Paulista currency refers to monetary systems used in the Brazilian state of São Paulo, usually as alternatives to the official Brazilian currency.

== History ==
The most famous example of Paulista currency was the "Bônus do Thesouro do Estado de São Paulo," which began circulating on 14 July 1932, after the start of the Constitutionalist Revolution. The money used by the people and the revolutionaries were printed in the village of Caieiras, at the time part of the municipality of Juquery, and they bore images of Paulista personalities, such as the bandeirantes Domingos Jorge Velho, Fernão Dias Paes, and Brazilian figures such as Duque de Caxias, Ruy Barbosa, Marquis of Tamandaré, Baron of Amazonas, and Marquis of Erval.

In addition to the Brazilian real, several other alternative or complementary currencies are used in São Paulo, . In the city of São Paulo, the sampaio and the solano are used in the southern zone; the cacimba is used in the eastern zone; and the beijas is used in the western zone. In other cities in the state, such as São Carlos, the vida is used, and in São Bernardo do Campo, commisari. In the 2010s, Flavio Cimonari Rebello, founder and president of the separatist movement São Paulo Livre, created a currency called ouro. His coins featured images of Father Joseph of Anchieta, the bandeirante Domingos Jorge Velho, the teacher and revolutionary Maria Sguassábia, the writers Mário de Andrade and Monteiro Lobato, and a protest; the banknotes featured images of the Portuguese colonial administrator Martim Afonso de Sousa, the indigenous chief Tibiriçá, the bandeirante Bartolomeu Bueno da Silva, the former slave Luís Gama, and the Italian businessman Francesco Matarazzo. However, it was only a proposal for a currency that would circulate in a possible Republic of São Paulo; it was never used as local currency.
