= Rufiyaa sign =

Rufiyaa sign
- In Unicode: U+20C2 ⃂ RUFIYAA SIGN

Currency
- Currency: Maldivian rufiyaa

Related
- See also: U+0783 ރ THAANA LETTER RAA

The rufiyaa sign is the currency sign used for the Maldivian rufiyaa, the official currency of the Maldives. The design was presented to the public by the Maldives Monetary Authority on 3 July 2022. It is based on the Thaana letter ރ, with an additional horizontal stroke. The symbol should precede the value, for example, 10.

== History ==
In 2021, the Maldives Monetary Authority (MMA) announced plans to introduce an official currency symbol for the Maldivian rufiyaa, which previously did not have a dedicated graphic sign. As part of this initiative, the MMA organised a design competition open to Maldivian citizens, publishing submission guidelines and evaluation criteria. The deadline for entries was 21 February 2021, and a total of 70 submissions were received. A design was subsequently selected by a panel of judges including officials from MMA and Dhivehi Bahuge Academy.

On 3 July 2022, the MMA officially introduced the rufiyaa currency symbol at its headquarters. The winning design, created by Hassan Shujau, was presented by Aminath Shauna. On 8 September 2022, the first banknotes incorporating the new symbol were issued. Naail Abdul Rahman and Abdulla Shafeeu submitted a proposal to the Unicode Consortium for inclusion of the symbol in The Unicode Standard on 10 March 2025. A revised second proposal was submitted on 13 March 2025, followed by a third and final revision submitted on 15 May 2025. On 18 July 2025, the Unicode Script Encoding Working Group approved the proposal, with inclusion expected in Unicode 18.0.

The sybmol was allocated the codepoint U+20C2 ⃂ RUFIYAA SIGN in Unicode version 18.0 (September 2026). Integration into the operating systems of computers and smartphones will follow within a few years and be released to user equipments that are still eligible to receive updates. (In the meantime, the .notdef symbol will be shown.)

== Design ==
The rufiyaa sign is based on the Thaana letter "ރ,” the first letter of "ރުފިޔާ" (rufiyaa in Dhivehi). A horizontal stroke has been added to the letter “ރ” to evoke the arithmetic equals sign, a motif commonly used in other currency symbols.
