= Philippine peso sign =

Currency symbol

₱

Philippine peso sign
- In Unicode: U+20B1 ₱ PESO SIGN

Currency
- Currency: Philippine peso

Different from
- Different from: U+20BD ₽ RUBLE SIGN (Russian ruble); U+2C63 Ᵽ LATIN CAPITAL LETTER P WITH STROKE

The Philippine peso sign (₱) is the currency symbol used for the Philippine peso, the official currency of the Philippines. The symbol resembles a Latin letter P with two horizontal strokes. It differs from the currency symbol used for the peso in Latin America, which is "$".

== History ==
The Philippine peso sign was introduced by Executive Order No. 66 of the United States colonial government on 3 August 1903. The sign, in capitalized Roman letter P with two parallel lines "passing through and extending slightly beyond loop at right angle to shaft or stem", was decreed to be used "by all officials as the designation of the new Philippine peso to differentiate it from the $ sign for US dollars and Spanish pesetas..." This sign was chosen by Charles Edward Magoon, acting chief of the Bureau of Insular Affairs, and was approved by Governor William H. Taft.

== Encoding ==
The peso is usually denoted by the symbol "₱". This symbol was added to the Unicode standard in version 3.2 and is assigned U+20B1 ₱ PESO SIGN. Ways of writing the Philippine Peso sign include "PHP", "PhP", "P", or "~~P~~" (strike-through or double-strike-through uppercase P). The more widely used modern computer fonts include the symbol as standard.

The international three-letter currency code for the Philippine peso is PHP.

== See also ==
- Economy of the Philippines
- Currency sign
