= Cruzeiro sign =

Symbol for the Brazilian cruzeiro

₢

Cruzeiro Sign
- In Unicode: 20A2

Currency
- Currency: Brazilian cruzeiro (1942–1967)

The Cruzeiro sign ⟨₢⟩ is a typographical abbreviation or ligature consisting of a capital Latin letter ⟨C⟩ with a nested lower-case letter ⟨r⟩, connected in a single glyph.

This glyph occasionally replaced the ⟨Cr⟩ part of the currency symbol for the first Brazilian cruzeiro, created in 1942, whose official symbol was "Cr $" (two separate letters, a space, and a single-stroke dollar sign). It could also have been used for other Brazilian currencies called "cruzeiro" that were official in 1942–1986 and 1990–1993.

Some typewriters and cash registers produced for the Brazilian market had ⟨₢⟩ keys, and it was available in some typefaces.

Brazilian standard keyboard layout, showing the "₢" symbol as obtained by the AltGr-C key combination.

The Brazilian keyboard layout ABNT-2 specified by the ABNT standard NBR 10346 specifies that the ⟨₢⟩ symbols should be available through the combination AltGr+C. However, since it refers to discontinued currencies, it is hardly ever used, and may not work.

The symbol was included in the Unicode standard (name "CRUZEIRO SIGN", code point U+20A2) since its first version.

== See also ==
- Dollar sign
