= Saudi Standards, Metrology and Quality Organization =

Saudi Standards, Metrology and Quality Organization (SASO)

Agency overview
- Formed: 1972; 53 years ago
- Jurisdiction: Saudi Arabia
- Headquarters: Riyadh, Saudi Arabia
- Website: www.saso.gov.sa

The Saudi Standards, Metrology and Quality Organization (SASO; Arabic: الهيئة السعودية للمواصفات والمقاييس والجودة) is a technical government body in Saudi Arabia was established in 1972 and governs tasks related to standards, metrology, and quality.

== Structure and Responsibilities ==
SASO is administrated by a board of directors headed by the Minister of Commerce and Investment and membership of sectors interested in standardization in the Kingdom.

The responsibilities of SASO is mainly focusing on designing and approving national standards for goods, products, and services. Its tasks also include the Issuance of regulations that ensure the assessment procedures of goods, products, and services under approved standards. Promoting awareness regarding standards and quality, conducting studies and research are also involved with the responsibilities of SASO.
