= Azerbaijani manat sign =

Currency sign

₼

Azerbaijani manat sign
- In Unicode: U+20BC ₼ MANAT SIGN

Currency
- Currency: Azerbaijani manat

The Azerbaijani manat symbol designed by Robert Kalina.

The Azerbaijani manat sign (₼, image:; Azerbaijani: Azərbaycan manatı; code: AZN) is the currency sign of the Azerbaijani manat. In Unicode, it is encoded at U+20BC ₼ MANAT SIGN. The shape is a round shaped version of the lowercase Latin letter "m".

== History ==
When Azerbaijan gained its independence after the dissolution of the Soviet Union in 1991, it put into circulation its own national currency, the Azerbaijani manat and the need for a monetary sign became immediately apparent. However, 15 years would pass, before Azerbaijan decided to design a monetary sign for the Azerbaijani manat and 22 years would pass, before Azerbaijan actually introduced the monetary sign for the Azerbaijani manat.

The new Azerbaijani manat banknotes and the Azerbaijani manat symbol, ₼, were designed by Robert Kalina in 2006, and the symbol was added to Unicode (U+20BC) in 2013, after failed addition proposals between 2008 and 2011. The Azerbaijani manat symbol design was inspired by the design of the Euro sign (€), based on an initial proposal by Mykyta Yevstifeyev, and resembles a single-bar Euro sign rotated 90° clockwise. The manat symbol is displayed to the right of the amount in Azeri and Russian.

== Outline ==
The symbol "₼" is a stylized lowercase Latin letter "m" in the form of a semicircle crossed by one vertical or diagonal line. The specific style depends on the typeface used to display the symbol on each banknote.
