= Colón (currency) =

Two Central American currencies

₡

Colón
- In Unicode: U+20A1 ₡ COLON SIGN

Currency
- Currency: Costa Rican colón, Salvadoran colón

The colón (₡) refers to two Central American currencies, both named for Christopher Columbus (Spanish: Cristóbal Colón):

- the Costa Rican colón (ISO 4217 code: CRC), used in Costa Rica since 1896
- the Salvadoran colón (ISO 4217 code: SVC), used in El Salvador from 1892 until 2001, when it was replaced by the American dollar

== Symbol ==
The symbol for the colón is "₡", written as a capital letter C crossed by two diagonal strokes. In Unicode, it is at code point U+20A1 ₡ COLON SIGN.

The correct way to write colones is with the symbol before the number (e.g. ₡1).
