= ISO-IR-197 =

Sámi character encoding, and proposed ISO-8859 part

ISO-IR-197 (known by the ISO-IR registration number of its GR set) is an 8-bit, single-byte character encoding which was designed for the Sámi languages. It is a modification of ISO 8859-1, replacing certain punctuation and symbol characters with additional letters used in certain Sámi orthographies. FreeDOS calls it code page 59187.

ISO-IR-197 was proposed for establishment as a part of ISO/IEC 8859 in 1996 (as part 14 and, later, part 15), but was not accepted for this. However, ISO-IR-197 is referenced in an informative ISO/IEC 8859 annex, which lists it as an encoding which provides a more adequate coverage of the orthography of certain Sámi languages such as Skolt Sámi than ISO-8859-4 or ISO-8859-10, unless the latter is combined with ISO-IR-158.

== Code page layout ==
Differences from ISO 8859-1 have their Unicode code points.

ISO-IR-197
	0	1	2	3	4	5	6	7	8	9	A	B	C	D	E	F
0x																
1x																
2x	SP	!	"	#	$	%	&	'	(	)	*	+	,	-	.	/
3x	0	1	2	3	4	5	6	7	8	9	:	;	<	=	>	?
4x	@	A	B	C	D	E	F	G	H	I	J	K	L	M	N	O
5x	P	Q	R	S	T	U	V	W	X	Y	Z	[	\	]		_
6x	`	a	b	c	d	e	f	g	h	i	j	k	l	m	n	o
7x	p	q	r	s	t	u	v	w	x	y	z	{	|	}	~	
8x																
9x																
Ax	NBSP	Č 010C	č 010D	Đ 0110	đ 0111	Ǥ 01E4	ǥ 01E5	§	Ǧ 01E6	©	ǧ 01E7	«	Ǩ 01E8	SHY	ǩ 01E9	Ŋ 014A
Bx	°	ŋ 014B	Š 0160	š 0161	´	Ŧ 0166	¶	·	ŧ 0167	Ž 017D	ž 017E	»	Ʒ 01B7	ʒ 0292	Ǯ 01EE	ǯ 01EF
Cx	À	Á	Â	Ã	Ä	Å	Æ	Ç	È	É	Ê	Ë	Ì	Í	Î	Ï
Dx	Ð	Ñ	Ò	Ó	Ô	Õ	Ö	×	Ø	Ù	Ú	Û	Ü	Ý	Þ	ß
Ex	à	á	â	ã	ä	å	æ	ç	è	é	ê	ë	ì	í	î	ï
Fx	ð	ñ	ò	ó	ô	õ	ö	÷	ø	ù	ú	û	ü	ý	þ	ÿ

== Windows extension ==
As documented by Evertype, some Windows implementations use a variant which adds graphical characters to the C1 area (0x80-9F), including some of the other characters from the Mac OS Sámi repertoire. This was intended to be analogous to the Windows version of Latin-1 (i.e. Windows-1252), and follows its layout where possible. Differences from Windows-1252 have their Unicode code point:

ISO-IR-197 Windows (differences only)
	0	1	2	3	4	5	6	7	8	9	A	B	C	D	E	F
8x			‚	ƒ	„	…	¬ 00AC	≠ 2260	£ 00A3	‰	¿ 00BF	Ȟ 021E	Œ			
9x		‘	’	“	”	•	–	—	® 00AE	™	¡ 00A1	ȟ 021F	œ			Ÿ

== ISO-IR-209 ==
ISO-IR-209 is an update that replaced the guillemets at 0xAB and 0xBB with the letter H with caron to add Finnish Romani support. FreeDOS calls it Code page 60211.

ISO-IR-209 (differences only)
	0	1	2	3	4	5	6	7	8	9	A	B	C	D	E	F
Ax	NBSP	Č	č	Đ	đ	Ǥ	ǥ	§	Ǧ	©	ǧ	Ȟ 021E	Ǩ	SHY	ǩ	Ŋ
Bx	°	ŋ	Š	š	´	Ŧ	¶	·	ŧ	Ž	ž	ȟ 021F	Ʒ	ʒ	Ǯ	ǯ
