= Windows-1270 =

Windows character set for Finnish

Windows-1270 is a code page used under Microsoft Windows to write Sami languages and the Finnish Kalo language.

== Character set ==
The following table shows Windows-1270. Each character is shown with its Unicode equivalent.

Windows-1270 (CP1270)
	0	1	2	3	4	5	6	7	8	9	A	B	C	D	E	F
0x	NUL	SOH	STX	ETX	EOT	ENQ	ACK	BEL	BS	HT	LF	VT	FF	CR	SO	SI
1x	DLE	DC1	DC2	DC3	DC4	NAK	SYN	ETB	CAN	EM	SUB	ESC	FS	GS	RS	US
2x	SP	!	"	#	$	%	&	'	(	)	*	+	,	-	.	/
3x	0	1	2	3	4	5	6	7	8	9	:	;	<	=	>	?
4x	@	A	B	C	D	E	F	G	H	I	J	K	L	M	N	O
5x	P	Q	R	S	T	U	V	W	X	Y	Z	[	\	]		_
6x	`	a	b	c	d	e	f	g	h	i	j	k	l	m	n	o
7x	p	q	r	s	t	u	v	w	x	y	z	{	|	}	~	DEL
8x	€		Č	ƒ	č	Ʒ	ʒ	Ǯ	ǯ	Đ	Š	‹	Œ			
9x		‘	’	“	”	•	–	—	đ	Ǧ	š	›	œ			Ÿ
Ax	NBSP	ǧ	Ǥ	£	¤	ǥ	¦	§	¨	©	Ȟ	«	¬	SHY	®	ȟ
Bx	°	±	Ǩ	ǩ	´	µ	¶	·	Ŋ	ŋ	Ŧ	»	ŧ	½	Ž	ž
Cx	À	Á	Â	Ã	Ä	Å	Æ	Ç	È	É	Ê	Ë	Ì	Í	Î	Ï
Dx	Ð	Ñ	Ò	Ó	Ô	Õ	Ö	×	Ø	Ù	Ú	Û	Ü	Ý	Þ	ß
Ex	à	á	â	ã	ä	å	æ	ç	è	é	ê	ë	ì	í	î	ï
Fx	ð	ñ	ò	ó	ô	õ	ö	÷	ø	ù	ú	û	ü	ý	þ	ÿ

Differences from Windows-1252
