= Sámi orthography =

Writing systems for the Sámi language

Sámi orthography refers to the various orthographies used by the eight Sámi languages that have their own literary language: Southern Sámi, Ume Sámi, Pite Sámi, Lule Sámi, Northern Sámi, Inari Sámi, Skolt Sámi, and Kildin Sámi.

== Orthographical trends ==
Three different orthographical trends can be identified for these Sámi languages. The first one uses the principle of having the Sámi orthography be the same as it is for the majority language of that country as its basis. This trend goes back to the traditions where the Sámi language was first being used as a written language, i.e., in Sweden. The literary language there that followed this principle was based on the old Ume Sámi literary language from the 18th century. This same literary language was partially used as the basis for the modern literary languages of Southern Sámi and Lule Sámi. The oldest orthography for Northern Sámi in Norway, that of Knud Leem, upholds this tradition. The second tradition goes back to Rasmus Rask's revision of Leem's orthography, as Rask builds on the phonemic principle. North Sámi, Inari Sámi, and Skolt Sámi follow this tradition. The third tradition is represented by the Kildin Sámi language for which a written language has been created three times: first by Russian missionaries using the Cyrillic alphabet as the basis for the language's orthography, then using the Latin alphabet at the end of 1920s into the 1930s as part of Joseph Stalin's language policy for minority languages, and finally once again returning to the Cyrillic alphabet at the end of the 1970s.

== The eight literary languages ==
With the exception of Kildin Sámi, the Sámi languages that have their own literary language are written with the standard Latin alphabet with the addition of some special characters.

=== Southern Sámi ===
Southern Sámi follows the principle of using the majority language of the particular country it is being used in as the basis for its orthography and thus has two separate versions: the Norwegian standard and the Swedish standard. The letters enclosed in parentheses are letters that are only used in foreign words. In addition, ï [ɨ] is a central version of i [i]. Although this difference is clearly indicated in dictionaries, most texts do not distinguish between the two. The collating order is however based on Norwegian across both sides of the border.

==== In Norway ====
А а	B b	(C c)	D d	E e	F f	G g	H h
I i	(Ï ï)	J j	K k	L l	M m	N n	O o
P p	(Q q)	R r	S s	T t	U u	V v	(W w)
(X x)	Y y	(Z z)	Æ æ	Ø ø	Å å

==== In Sweden ====
===== Bergsland–Hasselbrink orthography =====
The Bergsland–Hasselbrink orthography was in use in 1957 and is similar to the orthography used for Northern Sámi during the same period:

А а	Â â	Á á	B b	C c	Č č	D d	Đ đ
E e	F f	G g	H h	I i	Î î	J j	K k
L l	M m	N n	Ŋ ŋ	O o	P p	R r	S s
Š š	T t	U u	V v	Y y	Z z	Ž ž	Ä ä
Æ æ	Ö ö	Å å	'

===== The current orthography =====
А а	B b	(C c)	D d	E e	F f	G g	H h
I i	(Ï ï)	J j	K k	L l	M m	N n	O o
P p	(Q q)	R r	S s	T t	U u	V v	(W w)
(X x)	Y y	(Z z)	Ä ä	Ö ö	Å å

=== Ume Sámi ===
The Ume Sámi orthography has been in use for decades, but was finally approved in 2016:

А а	Á á	B b	D d	Đ đ	E e	F f	G g
H h	I i	Ï ï	J j	K k	L l	M m	N n
Ŋ ŋ	O o	P p	R r	S s	T t	Ŧ ŧ	U u
Ü ü	V v	Y y	Å å	Ä ä	Ö ö

=== Pite Sámi ===
On August 20, 2019, an official orthography was approved for Pite Sámi, containing the following letters:

А а	Á á	B b	D d	Đ đ	E e	F f	G g
H h	I i	J j	K k	L l	M m	N n	Ŋ ŋ
O o	P p	R r	S s	T t	Ŧ ŧ	U u	V v
Å å	Ä ä

=== Lule Sámi ===
Like Southern Sámi, Lule Sámi follows the principle of using the majority language of the particular country it's being written in as the basis for its orthography and thus has two separate versions: the Norwegian standard and the Swedish standard. The standard orthography for Lule Sámi was approved in 1983.

- In Norway, Áá, Åå, Ŋŋ, and Ææ are known to be used.
- In Sweden, Áá, Åå, Ŋŋ, and Ää are known to be used.

=== Northern Sámi ===
Northern Sámi has a long orthographic history, which has witnessed no less than nine different versions. The most recent version was approved in 1979 and last modified in 1985:

А а	Á á	B b	C c	Č č	D d	Đ đ	E e
F f	G g	H h	I i	J j	K k	L l	M m
N n	Ŋ ŋ	O o	P p	R r	S s	Š š	T t
Ŧ ŧ	U u	V v	Z z	Ž ž

=== Inari Sámi ===
The following alphabet for Inari Sámi was approved in 1996.

А а	Â â	B b	C c	Č č	D d	Đ đ	E e
F f	G g	H h	I i	J j	K k	L l	M m
N n	O o	P p	(Q q)	R r	S s	Š š	T t
U u	V v	(W w)	(X x)	Y y	Z z	Ž ž	Ä ä
Á á	Å å	Ö ö

=== Skolt Sámi ===
A a	Â â	B b	C c	Č č	Ʒ ʒ	Ǯ ǯ	D d
Đ đ	E e	F f	G g	Ǧ ǧ	Ǥ ǥ	H h	I i
J j	K k	Ǩ ǩ	L l	M m	N n	Ŋ ŋ	O o
Õ õ	P p	(Q q)	R r	S s	Š š	T t	U u
V v	(W w)	(X x)	(Y y)	Z z	Ž ž	Å å	Ä ä
(Ö ö)	ʹ

=== Kildin Sámi ===
The latest version of the official orthography for Kildin Sámi uses Cyrillic:

А а	А̄ а̄	Ӓ ӓ	Б б	В в	Г г	Д д	Е е	Е̄ е̄
Ё ё	Ё̄ ё̄	Ж ж	З з	Һ һ	(')	И и	Ӣ ӣ	Й й
Ј ј	(Ҋ ҋ)	К к	Л л	Ӆ ӆ	М м	Ӎ ӎ	Н н	Ӊ ӊ
Ӈ ӈ	О о	О̄ о̄	П п	Р р	Ҏ ҏ	С с	Т т	У у
Ӯ ӯ	Ф ф	Х х	Ц ц	Ч ч	Ш ш	Щ щ	Ъ ъ	Ы ы
Ь ь	Ҍ ҍ	Э э	Э̄ э̄	Ӭ ӭ	Ю ю	Ю̄ ю̄	Я я	Я̄ я̄

Note that ' is a variant of Һ and Ҋ is a variant of Ј, there is also a variant of the alphabet not using these two letters at all.
