= CER-GS =

Microsoft Windows Font Encoding Script

CER-GS (Celtic Extended Roman GS) is a character encoding for Windows CeltScript fonts. It is deprecated by Extended Latin-8, which contains the euro and disunifies the ampersands (both of these were done in an August 1998 update of Extended Latin-8).

== Character set ==
CER-GS
	0	1	2	3	4	5	6	7	8	9	A	B	C	D	E	F
0x																
1x																
2x	SP	!	"	#	$	%	&^{⁊}	'	(	)	*	+	,	-	.	/
3x	0	1	2	3	4	5	6	7	8	9	:	;	<	=	>	?
4x	@	A	B	C	D	E	F	G	H	I	J	K	L	M	N	O
5x	P	Q	R	S	T	U	V	W	X	Y	Z	[	\	]		_
6x	`	a	b	c	d	e	f	g	h	i	j	k	l	m	n	o
7x	p	q	r	s	t	u	v	w	x	y	z	{	|	}	~	
8x			Ḃ	Ċ	Ḋ	…	Ġ	Ṁ	ˆ	Ṗ	Ṡ	‹	Œ			
9x		‘	’	“	”	•	–	—	˜	™	ṡ	›	œ			¨
Ax	NBSP	ſ	¢	£	ḋ	Ḟ	¦	§	Ẁ	©	Ẃ	«	Ỳ	SHY	®	Ÿ
Bx	ġ	ẛ	ḃ	ċ	´	ḟ	¶	ṁ	ẁ	ṗ	ẃ	»	ỳ	Ẅ	ẅ	ɼ
Cx	À	Á	Â	Ã	Ä	Å	Æ	Ç	È	É	Ê	Ë	Ì	Í	Î	Ï
Dx	Ŵ	Ñ	Ò	Ó	Ô	Õ	Ö	Ṫ	Ø	Ù	Ú	Û	Ü	Ý	Ŷ	ß
Ex	à	á	â	ã	ä	å	æ	ç	è	é	ê	ë	ì	í	î	ï
Fx	ŵ	ñ	ò	ó	ô	õ	ö	ṫ	ø	ù	ú	û	ü	ý	ŷ	ÿ

- ^⁊ The character 0x26 maps to both & and ⁊ (Unicode character U+204A), which are unified.
