= ISO-IR-182 =

Digital text encoding

ISO-IR 182
- Language(s): Welsh
- Based on: ISO/IEC 8859-1
- Succeeded by: ISO/IEC 8859-14

ISO-IR-182 is a Welsh variant of ISO/IEC 8859-1 that supports the Welsh language. However, it lacks the letters used in the Irish language (which are in ISO/IEC 8859-14).

== Code page layout ==
Differences from ISO/IEC 8859-1 have the equivalent Unicode code point below the character.

ISO-IR 182
	0	1	2	3	4	5	6	7	8	9	A	B	C	D	E	F
0x																
1x																
2x	SP	!	"	#	$	%	&	'	(	)	*	+	,	-	.	/
3x	0	1	2	3	4	5	6	7	8	9	:	;	<	=	>	?
4x	@	A	B	C	D	E	F	G	H	I	J	K	L	M	N	O
5x	P	Q	R	S	T	U	V	W	X	Y	Z	[	\	]		_
6x	`	a	b	c	d	e	f	g	h	i	j	k	l	m	n	o
7x	p	q	r	s	t	u	v	w	x	y	z	{	|	}	~	
8x																
9x																
Ax	NBSP	¡	¢	£	¤	¥	¦	§	Ẁ 1E80	©	Ẃ 1E82	«	Ỳ 1EF2	SHY	®	Ÿ 0178
Bx	°	±	²	³	´	µ	¶	·	ẁ 1E81	¹	ẃ 1E83	»	ỳ 1EF3	Ẅ 1E84	ẅ 1E85	¿
Cx	À	Á	Â	Ã	Ä	Å	Æ	Ç	È	É	Ê	Ë	Ì	Í	Î	Ï
Dx	Ŵ 0174	Ñ	Ò	Ó	Ô	Õ	Ö	×	Ø	Ù	Ú	Û	Ü	Ý	Ŷ 0176	ß
Ex	à	á	â	ã	ä	å	æ	ç	è	é	ê	ë	ì	í	î	ï
Fx	ŵ 0175	ñ	ò	ó	ô	õ	ö	÷	ø	ù	ú	û	ü	ý	ŷ 0177	ÿ
