= Extended Latin-8 =

Character set

This is an extension of ISO 8859-14 for Windows CeltScript fonts. It deprecated CER-GS when this character encoding was updated in August 1998. FreeDOS calls it Code page 59620 (but the definitions may be different).

== Character set ==
Extended Latin-8
	0	1	2	3	4	5	6	7	8	9	A	B	C	D	E	F
0x																
1x																
2x	SP	!	"	#	$	%	&^{⁊}	'	(	)	*	+	,	-	.	/
3x	0	1	2	3	4	5	6	7	8	9	:	;	<	=	>	?
4x	@	A	B	C	D	E	F	G	H	I	J	K	L	M	N	O
5x	P	Q	R	S	T	U	V	W	X	Y	Z	[	\	]		_
6x	`	a	b	c	d	e	f	g	h	i	j	k	l	m	n	o
7x	p	q	r	s	t	u	v	w	x	y	z	{	|	}	~	
8x	€^{�}		°	ƒ	⁊^{±}	…	†	≠	≤	ɼ	ſ	‹	Œ			
9x		‘	’	“	”	•	–	—	≥	™	ẛ	›	œ			ı
Ax	NBSP	Ḃ	ḃ	£	Ċ	ċ	Ḋ	§	Ẁ	©	Ẃ	ḋ	Ỳ	SHY	®	Ÿ
Bx	Ḟ	ḟ	Ġ	ġ	Ṁ	ṁ	¶	Ṗ	ẁ	ṗ	ẃ	Ṡ	ỳ	Ẅ	ẅ	ṡ
Cx	À	Á	Â	Ã	Ä	Å	Æ	Ç	È	É	Ê	Ë	Ì	Í	Î	Ï
Dx	Ŵ	Ñ	Ò	Ó	Ô	Õ	Ö	Ṫ	Ø	Ù	Ú	Û	Ü	Ý	Ŷ	ß
Ex	à	á	â	ã	ä	å	æ	ç	è	é	ê	ë	ì	í	î	ï
Fx	ŵ	ñ	ò	ó	ô	õ	ö	ṫ	ø	ù	ú	û	ü	ý	ŷ	ÿ

Differences from CER-GS
- ^⁊ Before August 1998, the character 0x26 mapped to both & and ⁊ (Unicode character U+204A), which were unified.
- ^� Before August 1998 the code point 0x80 was empty.
- ^± Before August 1998, the character 0x84 mapped to ±, Unicode character U+00B1.
