= Mac OS Gaelic =

Character encoding for the Irish Gaelic language

- Language: Irish
- Created by: Evertype
- Current status: Adopted by Apple
- Classification: Extended ASCII
- Extends: US-ASCII
- Based on: Mac OS Celtic

Mac OS Gaelic is a character encoding created for the Irish Gaelic language, based on the Welsh Mac OS Celtic encoding but replacing 23 characters with Gaelic characters. It was developed by Michael Everson, and was in his CeltScript fonts and on some fonts included with the Irish localization of Mac OS 6.0.8 and 7.1 and on. FreeDOS calls it code page 58619.

Like ISO 8859-14, this codepage represents the Irish Gaelic and Welsh languages.

== Layout ==
Mac OS Gaelic
	0	1	2	3	4	5	6	7	8	9	A	B	C	D	E	F
2x	SP	!	"	#	$	%	&^{⁊}	'	(	)	*	+	,	-	.	/
3x	0	1	2	3	4	5	6	7	8	9	:	;	<	=	>	?
4x	@	A	B	C	D	E	F	G	H	I	J	K	L	M	N	O
5x	P	Q	R	S	T	U	V	W	X	Y	Z	[	\	]		_
6x	`	a	b	c	d	e	f	g	h	i	j	k	l	m	n	o
7x	p	q	r	s	t	u	v	w	x	y	z	{	|	}	~	
8x	Ä	Å	Ç	É	Ñ	Ö	Ü	á	à	â	ä	ã	å	ç	é	è
9x	ê	ë	í	ì	î	ï	ñ	ó	ò	ô	ö	õ	ú	ù	û	ü
Ax	†	°	¢	£	§	•	¶	ß	®	©	™	´	¨	≠	Æ	Ø
Bx	Ḃ	±	≤	≥	ḃ	Ċ	ċ	Ḋ	ḋ	Ḟ	ḟ	Ġ	ġ	Ṁ	æ	ø
Cx	ṁ	Ṗ	ṗ	ɼ	ƒ	ſ	Ṡ	«	»	…	NBSP	À	Ã	Õ	Œ	œ
Dx	–	—	“	”	‘	’	ṡ	ẛ	ÿ	Ÿ	Ṫ	€^{¤}	‹	›	Ŷ	ŷ
Ex	ṫ	·	Ỳ	ỳ	⁊^{‰}	Â	Ê	Á	Ë	È	Í	Î	Ï	Ì	Ó	Ô
Fx	☘^{♣}	Ò	Ú	Û	Ù	ı	Ý	ý	Ŵ	ŵ	Ẅ	ẅ	Ẁ	ẁ	Ẃ	ẃ

Differences from Mac OS Celtic
- ^⁊ Before Mac OS 8.5, 0x26 mapped to both & (ampersand) and ⁊ (Tironian et, Unicode character U+20A4), which were unified.
- ^¤ Before Mac OS 8.5, the character 0xDB mapped to currency sign (¤), Unicode character U+00A4.
- ^‰ Before Mac OS 8.5, the character 0xE4 mapped to ‰, Unicode character U+2030.
- ^♣ Before Unicode 4.1, the character 0xF0 mapped to ♣ Unicode character U+2663.
