= Mac OS Celtic =

Apple computer text character encoding

- Language: Welsh
- Created by: Evertype
- Current status: Adopted by Apple
- Classification: Extended ASCII
- Extends: US-ASCII
- Based on: Mac OS Roman
- Other related encoding: Mac OS Gaelic

Mac OS Celtic is a character encoding used by Mac OS to represent Welsh text (like ISO 8859-14), replacing 14 of the Mac OS Roman characters with Welsh characters. This character set was developed by Michael Everson and was used for the Irish localizations of Mac OS 6.0.8 and 7.1 and for the Welsh localization of Mac OS 7.1.

== Layout ==
The table below shows the second half of the encoding, the first half (codes 0–127) being ASCII.

Mac OS Celtic
	0	1	2	3	4	5	6	7	8	9	A	B	C	D	E	F
8x	Ä	Å	Ç	É	Ñ	Ö	Ü	á	à	â	ä	ã	å	ç	é	è
9x	ê	ë	í	ì	î	ï	ñ	ó	ò	ô	ö	õ	ú	ù	û	ü
Ax	†	°	¢	£	§	•	¶	ß	®	©	™	´	¨	≠	Æ	Ø
Bx	∞	±	≤	≥	¥	µ	∂	∑	∏	π	∫	ª	º	Ω	æ	ø
Cx	¿	¡	¬	√	ƒ	≈	∆	«	»	…	NBSP	À	Ã	Õ	Œ	œ
Dx	–	—	“	”	‘	’	÷	◊	ÿ	Ÿ	/	€^{¤}	‹	›	Ŷ	ŷ
Ex	‡	·	Ỳ	ỳ	‰	Â	Ê	Á	Ë	È	Í	Î	Ï	Ì	Ó	Ô
Fx	☘^{♣}	Ò	Ú	Û	Ù	ı	Ý	ý	Ŵ	ŵ	Ẅ	ẅ	Ẁ	ẁ	Ẃ	ẃ

Differences from MacRoman.
- ^¤ Before Mac OS 8.5, the character 0xDB mapped to currency sign (¤), Unicode character U+00A4.
- ^♣ Before Unicode 4.1, the character 0xF0 mapped to ♣ Unicode character U+2663.
