= S̀ =

Latin letter S with grave accent

S̀ (minuscule: s̀) is a letter of the Latin alphabet, formed from S with the addition of a grave accent. It is used in Ugaritic transliteration and the SICC orthography for the Dakota language, representing /ʃ/.

== Encodings ==
The HTML codes are:

- &#58032; for S̀ (upper case)

== See also ==
- Grave accent
- Z̀
- ś
