= T-bar =

T-bar may refer to:

- T with bar (Ŧ, ŧ)
- T-bar lift
- T-Bar (wrestler)
