= ℨ =

Blackletter z (ℨ𝔷 𝖅𝖟) may refer to:

- tailed z
- Dram (unit)
- Unicode character names:
  - Fraktur in Unicode
  - Mathematical Alphanumeric Symbols

== See also ==
- z
- Blackletter
- Ezh (Ʒ ʒ)
