= IJ =

IJ, ij or iJ may refer to:

== Places ==
- Ich, Zanjan or Īj, a village in Zanjan province, Iran
- IJ (Amsterdam), a body of water near Amsterdam, Netherlands
- İj River or Izh River, a river in Udmurtia and Tatarstan, Russian Federation
- Ij, Iran, a city in Fars province, Iran
- Ij Rural District, an administrative division of Estahban County, Fars province, Iran

== Other uses ==
- Ikkjutt Jammu, a political party in Jammu and Kashmir, India
- IJ (digraph), in the Dutch language
  - See also Latin alphabet#Medieval and later developments
- Congregation of the Holy Infant Jesus
- Immigration judge (United States), a Department of Justice official who administers removal proceedings of aliens
- Infinite Jest, a novel by David Foster Wallace
- Institute for Justice, a United States non-profit libertarian public interest law firm
- Inspectioneering Journal, a chemical and refining industry trade journal focusing on mechanical integrity
- Impractical Jokers, an American hidden camera reality prank television series
- Great Wall Airlines (IATA: IJ), a former Shanghai-based airline
- Spring Japan (IATA: IJ), a current Japanese airline

== See also ==
- IJK (disambiguation)
