= ISO/IEC 8859-14 =

8-bit character set

- MIME / IANA: ISO-8859-14
- Alias(es): iso-ir-199, latin8, iso-celtic, l8
- Languages: Irish, Manx, Scottish Gaelic, Welsh, Cornish, Breton, English
- Standard: ISO/IEC 8859-14:1998
- Classification: ISO/IEC 8859 (Extended ASCII, ISO/IEC 4873 level 1)
- Extends: US-ASCII
- Based on: ISO-IR-182

ISO/IEC 8859-14:1998, Information technology — 8-bit single-byte coded graphic character sets — Part 14: Latin alphabet No. 8 (Celtic), is part of the ISO/IEC 8859 series of ASCII-based standard character encodings, first edition published in 1998. It is informally referred to as Latin-8 or Celtic. It was designed to cover the Celtic languages, such as Irish and Welsh.

ISO-8859-14 is the IANA preferred charset name for this standard when supplemented with the C0 and C1 control codes from ISO/IEC 6429. CeltScript made an extension for Windows called Extended Latin-8. Microsoft has assigned code page 28604 a.k.a. Windows-28604 to ISO-8859-14. FreeDOS assigned code page 58163 to ISO-8859-14.

== History ==
ISO-8859-14 was originally proposed for the Sami languages. ISO 8859-12 was proposed for Celtic. Later, ISO 8859-12 was proposed for Devanagari, so the Celtic proposal was changed to ISO 8859-14. The Sami proposal was changed to ISO 8859-15, but it got rejected as an ISO/IEC 8859 part, although it was registered as ISO-IR-197.

The original proposal used a different arrangement of points 0xA1–BF. At the committee draft stage of the specification, a dotless i was included at 0xAE, which was changed to a registered trademark sign (matching ISO-8859-1) in the final publication.

ISO-IR-182, an earlier (registered in 1994) modification of ISO-8859-1, had added the letters Ẁ, Ẃ, Ẅ, Ỳ, Ÿ, Ŵ, Ŷ and their lowercase forms (except for ÿ, which was already included) for Welsh language use. The final published version of ISO-8859-14 includes these letters in the same positions which they appear at in ISO-IR-182.

== Code page layout ==
Differences from ISO-8859-1 have the Unicode code point number below the character.

ISO/IEC 8859-14
	0	1	2	3	4	5	6	7	8	9	A	B	C	D	E	F
0x																
1x																
2x	SP	!	"	#	$	%	&	'	(	)	*	+	,	-	.	/
3x	0	1	2	3	4	5	6	7	8	9	:	;	<	=	>	?
4x	@	A	B	C	D	E	F	G	H	I	J	K	L	M	N	O
5x	P	Q	R	S	T	U	V	W	X	Y	Z	[	\	]		_
6x	`	a	b	c	d	e	f	g	h	i	j	k	l	m	n	o
7x	p	q	r	s	t	u	v	w	x	y	z	{	|	}	~	
8x																
9x																
Ax	NBSP	Ḃ 1E02	ḃ 1E03	£	Ċ 010A	ċ 010B	Ḋ 1E0A	§	Ẁ 1E80	©	Ẃ 1E82	ḋ 1E0B	Ỳ 1EF2	SHY	®	Ÿ 0178
Bx	Ḟ 1E1E	ḟ 1E1F	Ġ 0120	ġ 0121	Ṁ 1E40	ṁ 1E41	¶	Ṗ 1E56	ẁ 1E81	ṗ 1E57	ẃ 1E83	Ṡ 1E60	ỳ 1EF3	Ẅ 1E84	ẅ 1E85	ṡ 1E61
Cx	À	Á	Â	Ã	Ä	Å	Æ	Ç	È	É	Ê	Ë	Ì	Í	Î	Ï
Dx	Ŵ 0174	Ñ	Ò	Ó	Ô	Õ	Ö	Ṫ 1E6A	Ø	Ù	Ú	Û	Ü	Ý	Ŷ 0176	ß
Ex	à	á	â	ã	ä	å	æ	ç	è	é	ê	ë	ì	í	î	ï
Fx	ŵ 0175	ñ	ò	ó	ô	õ	ö	ṫ 1E6B	ø	ù	ú	û	ü	ý	ŷ 0177	ÿ

=== Draft layout ===
The first draft had positions A0-BF different. It did not include the pilcrow sign, but included the cent sign instead at its Latin-1 position. Later, it was ruled that the pilcrow sign was more common, so the pilcrow sign remains at its Latin-1 position, and the cent sign was removed instead.

Differences from ISO-8859-14 have the Unicode code point below them.

ISO/IEC 8859-14 draft proposal changed rows only
	0	1	2	3	4	5	6	7	8	9	A	B	C	D	E	F
Ax	NBSP	Ḃ 1E02	¢ 00A2	£	ḃ 1E03	Ċ 010A	ċ 010B	§	Ẁ	©	Ẃ	Ṡ 1E60	Ỳ	SHY	®	Ÿ
Bx	Ḋ 1E0A	ḋ 1E0B	Ḟ 1E1E	ḟ 1E1F	Ġ 0120	ġ 0121	Ṁ 1E40	ṁ 1E41	ẁ	Ṗ 1E56	ẃ	ṡ 1E61	ỳ	Ẅ	ẅ	ṗ 1E57
