= Mac OS Sámi =

Apple computer text character encoding

Mac OS Sámi is a character encoding used on classic Mac OS to represent the Sámi languages and the Finnish Kalo language. While not used in any official Apple product, it has been used in various fonts designed to support Sámi languages under classic Mac OS, including those from Evertype. FreeDOS calls it code page 58630.

Each character is shown with its equivalent Unicode code point. Only the second half of the table (code points 128–255) is shown, the first half (code points 0–127) being the same as ASCII.

Mac OS Sámi
	0	1	2	3	4	5	6	7	8	9	A	B	C	D	E	F
8x	Ä	Å	Ç	É	Ñ	Ö	Ü	á	à	â	ä	ã	å	ç	é	è
9x	ê	ë	í	ì	î	ï	ñ	ó	ò	ô	ö	õ	ú	ù	û	ü
Ax	Ý	°	Č	£	§	•	¶	ß	®	©	™	´	¨	≠	Æ	Ø
Bx	Đ	Ŋ	≤	≥	Š	Ŧ	∂	Ž	č	đ	ŋ	š	ŧ	ž	æ	ø
Cx	¿	¡	¬	√	ƒ	≈	Ȟ	«	»	…	NBSP	À	Ã	Õ	Œ	œ
Dx	–	—	“	”	‘	’	÷	ȟ	ÿ	Ÿ	/	€^{¤}	Ð	ð	Þ	þ
Ex	ý	·	‚	„	‰	Â	Ê	Á	Ë	È	Í	Î	Ï	Ì	Ó	Ô
Fx	^{*}	Ò	Ú	Û	Ù	ı	Ʒ	ʒ	Ǯ	ǯ	Ǥ	ǥ	Ǧ	ǧ	Ǩ	ǩ

Differences from Mac OS Icelandic
- ^¤ The character 0xDB was previously mapped to the currency sign (¤), Unicode character U+00A4.
- ^* The character 0xF0 is a solid Apple logo. Apple uses U+F8FF in the Corporate Private Use Area for this logo, but it is usually not supported on non-Apple platforms.
