= Inspectioneering Journal =

Inspectioneering Journal is a technical publication that focuses on mechanical integrity and reliability issues in the chemical and refining industries. It is published bi-monthly. The magazine was established in 1995 and is based in Houston, Texas.
