= IJK =

IJK or ijk may refer to:

- IJK (singer songwriter) (born 1981), Lebanese singer-songwriter and podcaster
- Haplogroup IJK
- Indhiya Jananayaga Katchi, a political party in Tamil Nadu, India
- International Youth Congress (Esperanto: Internacia Junulara Kongreso)
- Izhevsk Airport, serving Udmurtia, Russia
- A convention of naming the axis of Euclidean vectors.
- In computer science, i, j, k; a common naming convention for the loop counter used in for loops.
