= Turned v =

Letter of the Latin alphabet

Ʌ
- Ʌ ʌ

Usage
- Writing system: Latin script
- Type: Alphabetic and Logographic
- Sound values: [ʌ]
- In Unicode: U+0245, U+028C

Other
- Writing direction: Left-to-Right

Ʌ (minuscule: ʌ), known as turned V, is a Latin-script letter. It is based on a turned form of the letter V.

It is used in the orthographies of Dan, Ch’ol, Nankina, Northern Tepehuán, Temne, Oneida, and Wounaan and also some orthographies of Ibibio.

Its lowercase is used in the International Phonetic Alphabet to represent an open-mid back unrounded vowel, the vowel in plus in many dialects of English.

Despite the similarity in appearance, the letter has no connection to the Greek Λ or Cyrillic Л.

== Character encoding ==
Character information
Preview	ʌ		Ʌ	
Unicode name	LATIN SMALL LETTER TURNED V		LATIN CAPITAL LETTER TURNED V	
Encodings	decimal	hex	dec	hex
Unicode	652	U+028C	581	U+0245
UTF-8	202 140	CA 8C	201 133	C9 85
Numeric character reference	&#652;	&#x28C;	&#581;	&#x245;

== Related characters ==
=== Descendants and related letters in the Latin alphabet ===
- ʌ with diacritics: ʌ́ ʌ̀
- ᶺ : Modifier letter small turned v is used in phonetic transcription

== See also ==
Similar symbols:

- Caron
- Caret
- Circumflex
- Logical conjunction
- Chevron (insignia)

== Bibliography ==
- Urua, Eno-Abasi; Moses Ekpenyong and Dafydd Gibbon. 2004. Uyo Ibibio Dictionary. Preprint draft. online copy
