= Z̀ =

Latin letter Z with grave accent

Z̀ (minuscule: z̀) is a letter of the Latin alphabet, formed from Z with the addition of a grave accent. It is used in the Old Welsh and Wenzhounese alphabets.

== See also ==
- Grave accent
- rz (digraph)
