= Ȟ =

Latin letter H with caron

Latin Capital and Lowercase letter H with caron

The grapheme Ȟ, ȟ (H with caron) is a letter used in the Finnish Kalo language and the Lakota language. It represents a voiceless velar fricative in the former and a voiceless uvular fricative in the latter.

== Computing codes ==
The letter's majuscule and minuscule forms are encoded in the Latin Extended-B Unicode block.

Character information
Preview	Ȟ		ȟ	
Unicode name	LATIN CAPITAL LETTER H WITH CARON		LATIN SMALL LETTER H WITH CARON	
Encodings	decimal	hex	dec	hex
Unicode	542	U+021E	543	U+021F
UTF-8	200 158	C8 9E	200 159	C8 9F
Numeric character reference	&#542;	&#x21E;	&#543;	&#x21F;
