= Ǩ =

Latin letter K with caron

K with caron in Doulos SIL

Ǩ (K with a caron) is a letter used in the Laz language and in the Skolt Saami language, where it represents [kʼ] and [c͡ç] respectively. The Unicode codepoints for this letter are U+01E8 ("Ǩ") for the capital letter, and U+01E9 ("ǩ") for the lowercase letter.

== See also ==
- Caron
