= Ž =

Latin letter Z with caron

Že
- Ž ž

Usage
- Writing system: Latin script
- Type: Alphabetic
- Language of origin: Czech language, Slovak language, Silesian language
- Sound values: [ʒ]; [ʐ]
- In Unicode: U+017D, U+017E

History
Development
Z4
        - Ζ ζ
          - 𐌆
            - Z z
              - Ż ż
                - Ž ž
- Transliterations: Ж; Ⰶ; Ż; ژ; Cyrillic, Glagolitic, Latin, Polish, Perso-Arabic

Other
- Associated numbers: 13, 27, 33
- Writing direction: Left-to-Right

The grapheme Ž (minuscule: ž) is formed from Latin Z with the addition of caron (Czech: háček, Slovak: mäkčeň, Slovene: strešica, Serbo-Croatian: kvačica). It is used in various contexts, usually denoting the voiced postalveolar fricative, the sound of English g in mirage, s in vision, or Portuguese and French j. In the International Phonetic Alphabet this sound is denoted with [ʒ], but the lowercase ž is used in the Americanist phonetic notation, as well as in the Uralic Phonetic Alphabet. In addition, ž is used as the romanisation of Cyrillic ж in ISO 9 and scientific transliteration.

For use in computer systems, Ž and ž are at Unicode codepoints U+017D and U+017E, respectively. On Windows computers, it can be typed with Alt+0142 and Alt+0158, respectively.

Ž is the last letter of most alphabets that contain it, but exceptions include Estonian, Karelian, Veps, and Turkmen.

== Origin ==
The symbol originates with the Czech alphabet. In Czech printed books it first appeared in the late 15th century. It evolved from the letter Ż, introduced by the author of the early 15th-century De orthographia Bohemica (probably Jan Hus) to indicate a Slavic fricative not represented in Latin alphabet. The punctus rotundus over was gradually replaced by háček (caron). This orthography later became standard and was popularized by the Bible of Kralice. It was occasionally used for the closely related Slovak language during the period when it lacked a literary norm. From Czech, it was adopted into the Croatian alphabet by Ljudevit Gaj in 1830, and then into the Slovak, Slovenian, Serbian and Bosnian alphabets. In addition, it features in the orthographies of the Baltic, some Uralic and other languages.

== Uses ==
=== Slavic languages ===
It is the 42nd letter of the Czech, the 46th letter of Slovak, the 25th letter of the Slovenian alphabet, as well as the 30th letter of the Serbo-Croatian Latin alphabet and the Macedonian one (as a counterpart or transliteration of Cyrillic Ж in the latter two). It is the 27th letter of the Sorbian alphabet, and it appears in the Belarusian Latin alphabet and in some variations of Ukrainian Latin alphabet.

It is used in Russian, Ukrainian, Belarusian, and Bulgarian transliteration.

The letter represents a voiced postalveolar fricative /ʒ/ or a similar voiced retroflex fricative /ʐ/.

In Polish, the corresponding letter is Ż/ż.

=== Baltic languages ===
It is the 32nd letter of the Lithuanian and 33rd letter of the Latvian alphabets.

=== Uralic languages ===
It is the 20th letter of the Estonian alphabet, where it is used in loan words. It is the 22nd letter of the Karelian and Veps alphabets. It is the 29th letter of the Northern Sami alphabet, where it represents [d͡ʒ]. It is regarded as a variant of Z in Finnish.

In Finnish, the letter ž is used in loan words, džonkki and maharadža, and in romanization of Cyrillic and other non-Latin alphabets. In Finnish and Estonian, it is possible to replace ž with zh when it is technically impossible to typeset the accented character.

In Hungarian, the corresponding letter is the digraph Zs.

=== Other languages ===
- It is the 12th letter of the Turkmen alphabet, pronounced [ʒ].
- It is the 33rd letter of the Laz alphabet, where it represents [d͡z].
- It is the 27th and last letter of the Songhay alphabet.
- It is used in Persian romanization, equivalent to ژ.
- It is used in Devanagari romanization for the letter झ़, albeit unofficially and rarely.
- It is also used in the standard orthography of the Lakota language.
- It is also used (unofficially) in Cypriot Greek to depict [ʒ], which does not occur in the Standard Modern Greek, or the Greek Alphabet.
- It is, at times, used for romanization of Syriac to represent [ʒ] in borrowed Iranian words, but the digraph "zh" is more commonly used.

== Computing code ==
Character information
Preview	Ž		ž	
Unicode name	LATIN CAPITAL LETTER Z WITH CARON		LATIN SMALL LETTER Z WITH CARON	
Encodings	decimal	hex	dec	hex
Unicode	381	U+017D	382	U+017E
UTF-8	197 189	C5 BD	197 190	C5 BE
Numeric character reference	&#381;	&#x17D;	&#382;	&#x17E;
Named character reference	&Zcaron;		&zcaron;	

== Gallery ==
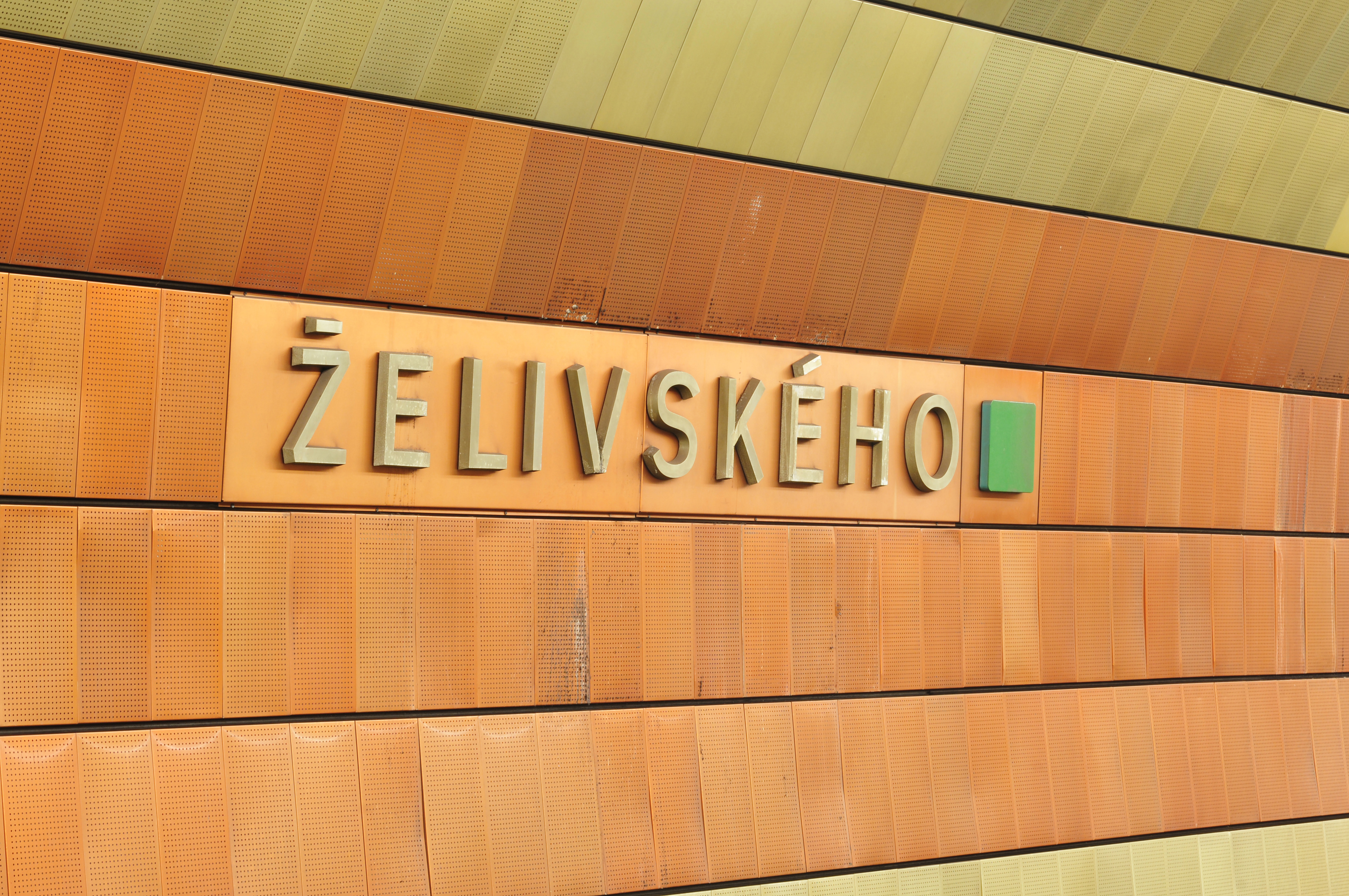
Želivského Prague Metro station

== See also ==
- Ż
- Rz (digraph)
- Ź
- Dž
- Že
- Zhe (Cyrillic)
