= Ǯ =

Letter of the Latin alphabet

Ezh with caron
- Ǯ ǯ
- Ʒ̆ ʒ̆
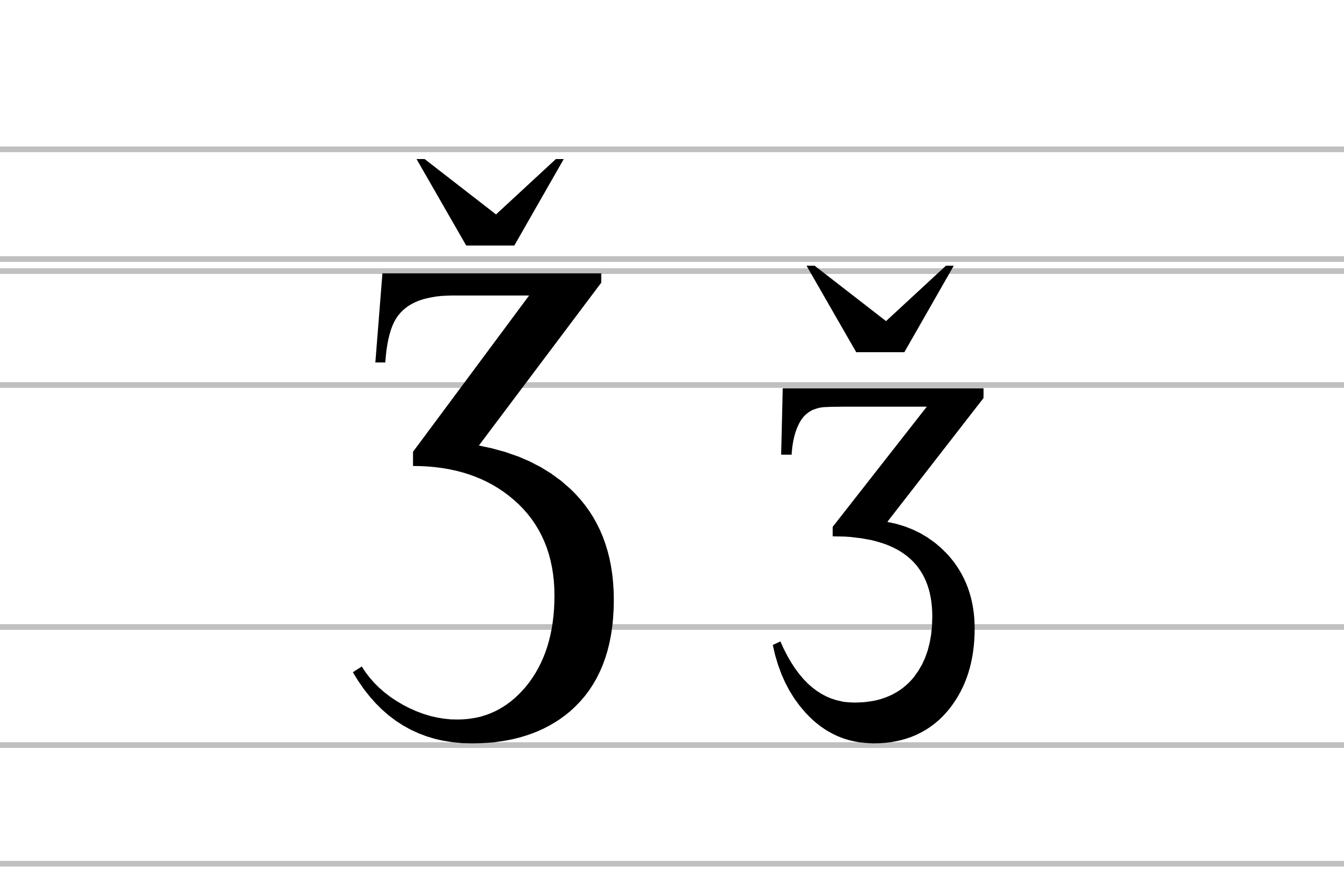

Usage
- Writing system: Latin script
- Type: alphabetic
- Language of origin: Skolt Sámi, Laz language
- Sound values: [d͡ʒ], [t͡sʼ]
- In Unicode: U+01EE U+01EF
- Alphabetical position: 7th (Skolt Sámi), 35th (Laz)

History
Development
Z4
        - Ζ ζ
          - 𐌆
            - Z z
              - Ǯ ǯ
- Time period: 1984-present (Laz), 1973-present (Skolt Sámi)
- Variations: Ʒ̆ ʒ̆

Ǯ (minuscule: ǯ) is a modified letter of the Latin alphabet, formed from ezh (ʒ) with the addition of a caron.

In the Uralic Phonetic Alphabet, it represents the sound [d͡ʒ].

Following its UPA usage, it was adopted in the Skolt Sami alphabet for the same value. It typically appears doubled, where it represents a geminate /d͡ʒ/. e.g. viǯǯâd "to fetch". The letter is also used in Laz, where it represents [t͡sʼ]. Until 2007, it was also used by Olonets Karelian language.

== Encoding ==
Character information
Preview	Ǯ		ǯ	
Unicode name	LATIN CAPITAL LETTER EZH WITH CARON		LATIN SMALL LETTER EZH WITH CARON	
Encodings	decimal	hex	dec	hex
Unicode	494	U+01EE	495	U+01EF
UTF-8	199 174	C7 AE	199 175	C7 AF
Numeric character reference	&#494;	&#x1EE;	&#495;	&#x1EF;

== Typing character ==
For Windows (Sámi Keyboard Layout): AltGr+V.
