= Ezh =

Letter of the Latin alphabet

- Ʒ ʒ
- (See below, Typography)

Usage
- Writing system: Latin script
- Type: Alphabetic and Logographic
- Language of origin: Latin language
- Sound values: [ʒ]; [d͡z]; [d͡ʒ]; [d͡ʑ]
- In Unicode: U+01B7, U+0292

History
Development
Z4
        - Ζ ζ
          - 𐌆
            - Z z
              - Ʒ ʒ
- Time period: 1847 to present
- Descendants: • Ƹ • Ǯ
- Sisters: Ž; З; Ѕ; Ԑ; Ԇ; Ҙ; ꙅ; ז; ز; ܙ; ژ; ࠆ; ዘ; 𐎇; Զ; զ; Ꮓ; Ꮛ; Ꮸ; ડ; ઢ; झ़
- Transliterations: zh, ž
- Variations: (See below, Typography)

Other
- Associated graphs: z(x), zh, ž
- Writing direction: Left-to-Right

Ezh (Ʒ ʒ; /ˈɛʒ/ EZH), also called the "tailed z", is a letter, notable for its use in the International Phonetic Alphabet (IPA) to represent the voiced palato-alveolar fricative consonant. This sound, sometimes transcribed ⟨zh⟩, occurs in the pronunciation as in vision (/ˈvɪʒən/), precision (/prɪˈsɪʒən/), azure (/ˈæʒər/), beige (/beɪʒ/), or pleasure (/ˈplɛʒər/).

Ezh is also used as a letter in some orthographies of Laz and Skolt Sami, both by itself, and with a caron (⟨Ǯ ǯ⟩). In Laz, these represent voiceless alveolar affricate /ts/ and its ejective counterpart /tsʼ/, respectively. In Skolt Sami they respectively denote partially voiced alveolar and post-alveolar affricates, broadly represented /dz/ and /dʒ/. It also appears in the orthography of some African languages, for example in the Aja language of Benin and the Dagbani language of Ghana, where the uppercase variant looks like a reflected sigma ⟨Σ⟩. It also appears in the orthography of Uropi.

The voiced palato-alveolar fricative, the sound /ʒ/ represents in the International Phonetic Alphabet, is more commonly represented by various other letters in different languages. These include the letter ⟨Ž⟩ as used in many Slavic languages, the letter ⟨Ż⟩ as used in Kashubian, the letter ⟨ج⟩ in a number of Arabic dialects, the Persian alphabet letter ⟨ژ⟩, the Cyrillic letter ⟨Ж⟩, the Devanagari letter (झ़), and the Esperanto letter ⟨Ĵ⟩.

== Origin ==
As a phonetic symbol, it originates with Isaac Pitman's English Phonotypic Alphabet in 1847, as a z with an added hook. The symbol is based on medieval cursive forms of Latin ⟨z⟩, evolving into the blackletter ⟨z⟩ letter ⟨ℨ𝔷 𝖅𝖟⟩. In Unicode, however, the blackletter ⟨z⟩ ("tailed z", German geschwänztes Z) is considered a glyph variant of ⟨z⟩, and not an ezh. Humanist Gian Giorgio Trissino proposed in 1524 a reform of Italian orthography introducing ezh as an uppercase ⟨ç⟩ for the [dz] sound.

In contexts where "tailed z" is used in contrast to tail-less z, notably in standard transcription of Middle High German, Unicode ⟨ʒ⟩ is sometimes used, strictly speaking incorrectly. Unicode offers ⟨ȥ⟩ "z with hook" as a grapheme for Middle High German coronal fricative instead.

== Similarities to other glyphs ==
=== Yogh ===
In Unicode 1.0, the character was unified with the unrelated character yogh ⟨Ȝ ȝ⟩, which was not correctly added to Unicode until Unicode 3.0. Historically, ezh is derived from Latin ⟨z⟩, but yogh is derived from Latin ⟨g⟩ by way of insular G. The characters look very similar and do not appear alongside each other in any alphabet. To differentiate between the two more clearly, the Oxford University Press and the Early English Text Society extend the uppermost tip of the yogh into a little curvature upward.

=== Numeral three ===
The ezh looks similar to the common form of the figure three ⟨3⟩. To differentiate between the two characters, ezh includes the sharp zigzag of the letter ⟨z⟩, while the number is usually curved. Some typefaces use a form of ⟨3⟩ with a flat top, very similar (or virtually identical) to an ezh.

In handwritten Cyrillic, the numeral ⟨3⟩ is sometimes written in a form similar to the ezh, so as to distinguish it from the letter ze ⟨З⟩.

=== Hiragana ro ===
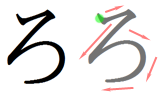
Stroke order in writing ろ (Japanese hiragana)

Ezh looks similar to the syllabogram ⟨ろ⟩, which is the hiragana form of the Japanese mora ro.

=== Cyrillic ze and dze ===
The Cyrillic letter ze ⟨З з⟩ has a similar body to Ezh and the Abkhazian dze ⟨Ӡ ӡ⟩. As customary, the Cyrillic script has a stiffer structure, but both letters have common roots in historical cursive forms of the Greek letter zeta ⟨Ζ ζ⟩.

However, Latin ezh and Cyrillic ze represent different phonemes: the former generally represents /ʒ/, while the latter represents /z/. Cyrillic uses zhe ⟨Ж ж⟩ for the /ʐ/ phoneme.

== Usage ==
The two West African forms of the capital letter ezh (Ʒ and Σ)

=== Language orthographies ===
In 1524, Gian Giorgio Trissino proposed in a reform of Italian orthography that ⟨Ʒ ç⟩ represent [dz]; however, the reform was not successful, and today ⟨Z z⟩ is used for that sound.

In the IPA it represents the voiced postalveolar fricative consonant. For example: vision /ˈvɪʒən/. It is pronounced as the ⟨s⟩ in "treasure" or the ⟨si⟩ in the word "precision".

It is used with that value in Uropi.

It is used in the "International Standard" orthography, as devised by Marcel Courthiade for Romani.

It is used in the Slavistic Phonetic Alphabet, where ⟨ʒ⟩ represents /d͡z/, ⟨ʒ́⟩ represents /d͡ʑ/, and ⟨ǯ⟩ represents /d͡ʒ/.

It was used in an obsolete Latin alphabet for writing Komi, where it represented [d͡ʑ] (similar to English ⟨j⟩). In the modern Cyrillic alphabet, this sound is written as "дз".

It was used during Latinisation in the USSR in the project of Unified Northern Alphabet and other alphabets of the people of the Soviet Union during the 1920–1930s.

It was also used for the Initial Teaching Alphabet.

=== Ezh as an abbreviation for dram ===
In Unicode, a standard designed to allow symbols from all writing systems to be represented and manipulated by computers, the ezh is also used as the symbol to represent the abbreviation for dram or drachm, an apothecaries' system unit of mass. Unicode has no dedicated symbol for dram, but the Unicode code table entry for ezh reads "LATIN SMALL LETTER EZH = dram sign". The upper-case letter z in Blackletter/Fraktur hand, ℨ, is also seen used for dram, but this letter is meant to be used in mathematics and phonetics, and is not recommended as an abbreviation for dram.

== Encoding and ligatures ==
The Unicode code points are U+01B7 for ⟨Ʒ⟩ and U+0292 for ⟨ʒ⟩. Ezh with caron is also precomposed in Unicode with the code points U+01EE for ⟨Ǯ⟩ and U+01EF for ⟨ǯ⟩.

The IPA historically allowed for ezh to be ligatured to other letters; some of these ligatures have been added to the Unicode standard.

- Dezh ligatures ezh with the letter D (U+02A4 ʤ LATIN SMALL LETTER DEZH DIGRAPH).
- Lezh ligatures ezh with the letter L (U+026E ɮ LATIN SMALL LETTER LEZH).
- Tezh ligatures ezh with the letter T (U+A728 Ꜩ LATIN CAPITAL LETTER TZ and U+A729 ꜩ LATIN SMALL LETTER TZ).

Related obsolete IPA characters include U+01BA ƺ LATIN SMALL LETTER EZH WITH TAIL and U+0293 ʓ LATIN SMALL LETTER EZH WITH CURL.

U+1DBE ᶾ MODIFIER LETTER SMALL EZH and U+1D9A ᶚ LATIN SMALL LETTER EZH WITH RETROFLEX HOOK are also used for phonetic transcription.

U+1D23 ᴣ LATIN LETTER SMALL CAPITAL EZH is used in the Uralic Phonetic Alphabet.

U+1DF18 𝼘 LATIN SMALL LETTER EZH WITH PALATAL HOOK was previously used in the IPA.

== Typing character ==
For Mac: Option⌥+:, followed by ⇧ Shift+Z or Z respectively.

For Windows (Sámi Keyboard Layout): AltGr+B.

== Gallery ==
Coat of arms of Bad Zurzach

== See also ==
- Unified Northern Alphabet
- Reversed Ezh (Ƹ ƹ)
- Abkhazian Dze (Ӡ ӡ)
- Cyrillic Ze (З з)
