= T with stroke =

25th letter in the Northern Sámi alphabet

Latin T with stroke

Ŧ (lowercase: ŧ, Latin alphabet), known as T with stroke or T with bar, is used in several alphabets for different purposes. It is the 25th letter in the Northern Sámi alphabet, where it represents the voiceless dental fricative [θ]. In the SENĆOŦEN alphabet, it represents [s̪]. It is also used in the Hualapai alphabet, as well as in several orthographies for African languages, e.g., for Hassaniya Arabic in Senegal. The Unicode codepoints for this letter are U+0166 Ŧ LATIN CAPITAL LETTER T WITH STROKE and U+0167 ŧ LATIN SMALL LETTER T WITH STROKE.

== Computing code ==
Character information
Preview	Ŧ		ŧ	
Unicode name	LATIN CAPITAL LETTER T WITH STROKE		LATIN SMALL LETTER T WITH STROKE	
Encodings	decimal	hex	dec	hex
Unicode	358	U+0166	359	U+0167
UTF-8	197 166	C5 A6	197 167	C5 A7
Numeric character reference	&#358;	&#x166;	&#359;	&#x167;
Named character reference	&Tstrok;		&tstrok;	

== See also ==
- Bar (diacritic)
