= Ÿ =

Latin letter Y with diaeresis

Y with diaeresis
- Ÿ ÿ

Usage
- Type: alphabetic
- Language of origin: America: Cocama; Paunaka; Tlingit; Europe: French; Hungarian; Welsh; Ligature of ij: Dutch; German; Swedish

History
- Development: Y y: ij → ÿ | y + ̈; Ÿ ÿ

Other
- Writing direction: left-to-right

Ÿ (minuscule: ÿ) is a Latin script character composed of the letter ⟨y⟩ and the two dots ⟨◌̈⟩ diacritical mark. The character is fairly rare.

== Usage ==
Ÿ as the ligature ij (→ ÿ)

In historical European orthography, it has been used as a ligature of the digraph ij (→ ÿ), which sometimes still occur – cf. IJmuiden → Ÿmuiden.

It occurs in French as a diaeresis, appearing as a variant of ⟨ï⟩ in a few proper nouns, as in the name of the Parisian suburb of L'Haÿ-les-Roses (French pronunciation: [laj le ʁoz]) and in the surname of the house of Croÿ [kʁu.i]. It function as a diaeresis. As with other French vowels with a diaresis, the ⟨ÿ⟩ indicates the second of two vowels in hiatus.

It occurs in a few Hungarian proper nouns as well, such as Lajos Méhelÿ and Margit Danÿ. It also functions as a diaresis, but shows that the ⟨ÿ⟩ is pronounced as separate ⟨i⟩ instead of being the second letter in the Hungarian digraphs ⟨gy⟩, ⟨ly⟩, ⟨ny⟩ and ⟨ty⟩.

In Tlingit, ⟨ÿ⟩ represented the sound [ɰ], but is not used today as the sound has merged with [j] and [w].

In Paunaka, the letter is used to represent the vowel close central unrounded vowel /[ɨ]/.

The Cocama language also uses this letter.

The International Phonetic Alphabet uses ⟨ÿ⟩ to transcribe the close central compressed vowel, a type of vowel sound used in some spoken languages.

The character has also found use as a gratuitous metal umlaut, notably for the metal band Queensrÿche.

== In Unicode ==
- U+00FF ÿ LATIN SMALL LETTER Y WITH DIAERESIS
- U+0178 Ÿ LATIN CAPITAL LETTER Y WITH DIAERESIS

The lowercase ÿ has the Unicode code U+00FF, or 255, making it often appear when binary files are opened as text files.

As a diaeresis is never used on the first letter of a word and all-caps text typically omitted all accents, there was assumed to be no need for an uppercase ⟨Ÿ⟩ when computer character sets such as CP437 and ISO 8859-1 were designed. However much software assumes that conversion from lower-case to upper-case and then back again is lossless, so ⟨Ÿ⟩ was added to many character sets such as CP1252, ISO 8859-15, and Unicode. This phenomenon also arose for the German eszett ⟨ß⟩.
