= Grave accent =

Diacritical mark (◌̀)

◌̀o

Grave accent
- U+0300 ◌̀ COMBINING GRAVE ACCENT (diacritic)

See also
- U+0060 ` GRAVE ACCENT ('backtick' symbol); U+02CB ˋ MODIFIER LETTER GRAVE ACCENT (diacritic)

The grave accent (`, ◌̀) (/ˈɡreɪv/ GRAYV or /ˈɡrɑːv/ GRAHV) is a diacritical mark used to varying degrees in French, Dutch, Portuguese, Italian, Catalan and many other Western European languages as well as for a few unusual uses in English. It is also used in other languages using the Latin alphabet, such as Mohawk and Yoruba, and with non-Latin writing systems such as the Greek and Cyrillic alphabets and the Bopomofo or Zhuyin Fuhao semi-syllabary. It has no single meaning, but can indicate pitch, stress, or other features.

For the most commonly encountered uses of the accent in the Latin and Greek alphabets, precomposed characters are available. For less-used and compound diacritics, a combining character facility is available. A free-standing version of the symbol (`), commonly called a backtick, also exists and has acquired other uses.

== Uses ==
=== Pitch ===
The grave accent first appeared in the polytonic orthography of Ancient Greek to mark a lower pitch than the high pitch of the acute accent. In modern practice, it replaces an acute accent in the last syllable of a word when that word is followed immediately by another word. The grave and circumflex have been replaced with an acute accent in the modern monotonic orthography.

The accent mark was called βαρεῖα, the feminine form of the adjective βαρύς (barús), meaning 'heavy' or 'low in pitch'. This was calqued (loan-translated) into Latin as gravis, which then became the word grave.

=== Stress ===
The grave accent marks the stressed vowels of words in Maltese, Catalan, and Italian.

A general rule in Italian is that words that end with stressed -a, -i, or -u must be marked with a grave accent. Words that end with stressed -e or -o may bear either an acute accent or a grave accent, depending on whether the final e or o sound is closed or open, respectively. Some examples of words with a final grave accent are città ('city'), così ('so/then/thus'), più ('more, plus'), Mosè ('Moses'), and portò ('[he/she/it] brought/carried'). Typists who use a keyboard without accented characters and are unfamiliar with input methods for typing accented letters sometimes use a separate grave accent or even an apostrophe instead of the proper accent character. This is nonstandard but is especially common when typing capital letters: *E` or *E' instead of È ('[he/she/it] is'). Other mistakes arise from the misunderstanding of truncated and elided words: the phrase un po' ('a little'), which is the truncated version of un poco, may be mistakenly spelled as *un pò. Italian has word pairs where one has an accent marked and the other not, with different pronunciation and meaning—such as pero ('pear tree') and però ('but'), and papa ('pope') and papà ('dad'); the latter example is also valid for Catalan.

In Bulgarian, the grave accent sometimes appears on the vowels а̀, о̀, у̀, ѐ, ѝ, ъ̀, я̀, and ю̀ to mark stress. It most commonly appears in books for children or foreigners, and dictionaries—or to distinguish between near-homophones: па̀ра (pàra 'steam, vapour') and пара̀ (parà, 'cent, penny, money'), въ̀лна (vằlna 'wool') and вълна̀ (vǎlnà 'wave'). While the stress is not marked most of the time a notable exception is the single-vowel word и: without an accent it denotes the 'and' conjunction (рокля и пола = 'dress and skirt') while stressed shows the possessive pronoun 'her' (роклята ѝ = 'her dress'). Hence the rule to always mark the stress in this isolated case.

In Macedonian, the stress mark is orthographically required to distinguish homographs (see § Disambiguation) and is put mostly on the vowels е and и. Then, it forces the stress on the accented word-syllable instead of having a different syllable in the stress group getting accented. In turn, it changes the pronunciation and the whole meaning of the group.

Ukrainian, Rusyn, Belarusian, and Russian used a similar system until the first half of the 20th century. Now the main stress is preferably marked with an acute, and the role of the grave is limited to marking secondary stress in compound words (in dictionaries and linguistic literature).

In Croatian, Serbian, and Slovene, the stressed syllable can be short or long and have a rising or falling tone. They use (in dictionaries, orthography, and grammar books, for example) four different stress marks (grave, acute, double grave, and inverted breve) on the letters a, e, i, o, r, and u: à è ì ò r̀ ù. The system is identical in both Latin and Cyrillic scripts. Unicode forgot to encode R-grave when encoding the letters with stress marks.

In modern Church Slavonic, there are three stress marks (acute, grave, and circumflex), which formerly represented different types of pitch accent. There is no longer any phonetic distinction between them, only an orthographical one. The grave is typically used when the stressed vowel is the last letter of a multiletter word.

In Ligurian, the grave accent marks the accented short vowel of a word in à (sound [a]), è (sound [ɛ]), ì (sound [i]) and ù (sound [y]). For ò, it indicates the short sound of [o], but may not be the stressed vowel of the word.

Although not its primary goal, the grave accent in Portuguese always marks an unstressed syllable in the words in which it is used, e.g. "àquilo" [aˈki.lu]. This contrasts with the circumflex and the acute accent, which are always used on stressed vowels. For instance, ás (ace) is stressed ['as]~['aʃ], whereas às (to the, feminine) is not [as]~ [aʃ]. This accent is used in circumstances in which the article "a" overlaps with the preposition "a", such as in the phrase "Preciso ir à rodoviária.", or "Irei à praia." In those phrases, the feminine noun that comes after "à" requires an article and a preposition at the same time, and the accent serves to indicate that those functions merged into one word.

=== Height ===
The grave accent marks the height or openness of the vowels e and o, indicating that they are pronounced open: è [ɛ] (as opposed to é [e]); ò [ɔ] (as opposed to ó [o]), in several Romance languages:

- Catalan uses the accent on three letters (a, e, and o).
- French orthography uses the accent on three letters (a, e, and u).
  - The ù is used in only one word, où ('where'), to distinguish it from its homophone ou ('or').
  - The à is used in only a small closed class of words, including à, là, and çà (homophones of a, la, and ça, respectively), and déjà.
  - The è is used more broadly to represent the vowel /ε/, in positions where a plain e would be pronounced as /ə/ (schwa). Many verb conjugations contain regular alternations between è and e; for example, the accent mark in the present tense verb lève [lεv] distinguishes the vowel's pronunciation from the schwa in the infinitive, lever [ləve].
- Italian
- Occitan
- Ligurian also uses the grave accent to distinguish the sound [o], written ò, from the sound [u], written ó or o.

=== Disambiguation ===
In several languages, the grave accent distinguishes both homophones and words that otherwise would be homographs:

- In Bulgarian and Macedonian, it distinguishes the conjunction и ('and') from the short-form feminine possessive pronoun ѝ.
- In Catalan, it distinguishes homophone words such as ma ('my (f)') and mà ('hand').
- In French, the grave accent on the letters a and u has no effect on pronunciation and just distinguishes homonyms otherwise spelled the same, for example the preposition à ('to/belonging to/towards') from the verb a ('[he/she/it] has') as well as the adverb là ('there') and the feminine definite article la; it is also used in the words déjà ('already'), deçà (preceded by en or au, and meaning 'closer than, inferior to (a given value)'), the phrase çà et là ('hither and thither'; without the accents, it would literally mean 'it and the') and its functional synonym deçà, delà. It is used on the letter u only to distinguish où ('where') and ou ('or'). È is rarely used to distinguish homonyms except in dès/des ('since/some'), ès/es ('in/[thou] art'), and lès/les ('near/the').
- In Italian, it distinguishes, for example, the feminine article la from the adverb là ('there').
- In Norwegian (both Bokmål and Nynorsk), the grave accent separates words that would otherwise be identical: og 'and' and òg 'too'. Popular usage, possibly because Norwegian rarely uses diacritics, often leads to a grave accent in place of an acute accent.
- In Romansh, it distinguishes (in the Rumantsch Grischun standard) e ('and') from the verb form è ('he/she/it is') and en ('in') from èn ('they are'). It also marks distinctions of stress (gia 'already' vs. gìa 'violin') and of vowel quality (letg 'bed' vs. lètg 'marriage').

=== Length ===
In Welsh, the accent denotes a short vowel sound in a word that would otherwise be pronounced with a long vowel sound: mẁg [mʊɡ] 'mug' versus mwg [muːɡ] 'smoke'.

In Scottish Gaelic, it denotes a long vowel, such as cùis [kʰuːʃ] ('subject'), compared with cuir [kʰuɾʲ] ('put'). The use of acute accents to denote the rarer close long vowels, leaving the grave accents for the open long ones, is seen in older texts, but it is no longer allowed according to the new orthographic conventions.

=== Tone ===
In some tonal languages such as Vietnamese, and Mandarin Chinese (when it is written in Hanyu Pinyin or Zhuyin Fuhao), the grave accent indicates a falling tone. The alternative to the grave accent in Mandarin is the numeral 4 after the syllable: pà = pa4.

In African languages and in International Phonetic Alphabet, the grave accent often indicates a low tone: Nobiin jàkkàr ('fishhook'), Yoruba àgbọ̀n ('chin'), Hausa màcè ('woman').

The grave accent represents the low tone in Mohawk.

=== Other uses ===
In older transcriptions of Cuneiform a grave diacritics was used to differentiate between characters, with the same pronunciation. As of 2023 the use of the subscript numeral "3" is preferred instead of a grave accent E.g. "tù" is equivalent to "tu₃".

In Emilian, a grave accent placed over e or o denotes both length and openness; è and ò represent [ɛː] and [ɔː].

In Hawaiian, the grave accent is not placed over another character but is sometimes encountered as a typographically easier substitute for the ʻokina: Hawai`i instead of Hawaiʻi.

In Philippine languages, the grave accent (paiwà) is used to represent a glottal stop in the last vowel of the word with the stress occurring in the first or middle syllable such as in Tagalog batà [ˈbataʔ] ('child').

In Portuguese, the grave accent indicates the contraction of two consecutive vowels in adjacent words (crasis). For example, instead of a aquela hora ('at that hour'), one says and writes àquela hora.

In Romagnol, a grave accent placed over e or o denotes both length and openness, representing [ɛ] and [ɔ].

In Spanish, the grave accent was used until 1815 in Standard Spanish when it was removed by the Royal Spanish Academy. It was used in words like à (to), and è (and).

=== English ===
The grave accent, though rare in English words, sometimes appears in poetry and song lyrics to indicate that a usually silent vowel is pronounced to fit the rhythm or meter. Most often, it is applied to a word that ends with -ed. For instance, the word looked is usually pronounced /ˈlʊkt/ as a single syllable, with the e silent; when written as lookèd, the e is pronounced: /ˈlʊkɪd/ look-ed). In this capacity, it can also distinguish certain pairs of identically spelled words like the past tense of learn, learned /ˈlɜːrnd/, from the adjective learnèd /ˈlɜːrnɪd/ (for example, "a very learnèd man").

A grave accent can also occur in a foreign (usually French) term which has not been anglicised: for example, vis-à-vis, pièce de résistance or crème brûlée. It also may occur in an English name, often as an affectation, as for example in the case of Albert Ketèlbey.

== Unicode ==
Unicode encodes a number of cases of "letter with grave" as precomposed characters and these are displayed below. In addition any character can have a grave accent added by following it with the combining characters U+0300 ◌̀ COMBINING GRAVE ACCENT or U+0316 ◌̖ COMBINING GRAVE ACCENT BELOW. No such combinations are shown in this table.

- Grave ◌̀
  Latin: À à
- Ầ ầ
- Ằ ằ
- È è
- Ề ề
- Ḕ ḕ
- Ì ì
- Ǹ ǹ
- Ò ò
- Ờ ờ
- Ồ ồ
- Ṑ ṑ
- ɔ̀
- S̀ s̀
- Ù ù
- Ǜ ǜ
- Ừ ừ
- ʌ̀
- Ẁ ẁ
- Ỳ ỳ
- Z̀ z̀
  Greek: Ὰ ὰ
- Ὲ ὲ
- Ὴ ὴ
- Ὶ ὶ
- Ὸ ὸ
- Ὺ ὺ
- Ὼ ὼ
  Cyrillic: Ѐ ѐ
- Ѝ ѝ
