= C =

Third letter of the Latin alphabet

- C c

Usage
- Writing system: Latin script
- Type: Alphabetic
- Language of origin: Latin language
- Sound values: [k]; [t͡ʃ]; [t͡s]; [d͡ʒ]; [ʃ]; [s]; [c]; [ʕ]; [ʔ]; [θ]; [ð]; [ʑ]
- In Unicode: U+0043, U+0063
- Alphabetical position: 3

History
Development
T14
        - Γ γ
          - 𐌂
            - C c
- Time period: c. 700 BCE – present
- Descendants: ç; ⒞ Ⓒ ⓒ; 🄒 🄫 🄯 🄲 🅒 🅲 🇨; Ȼ; ₵; ₡; ¢; ℃; ∁
- Sisters: Г; G; Գ; (𐡂 ࠂ ג ܓ ج)

Other
- Associated numbers: 100

C in copyright symbol

C (minuscule: c) is the third letter of the Latin alphabet, used in the modern English alphabet, the alphabets of other western European languages and others worldwide. Its name in English is cee (pronounced /ˈsiː/), plural cees.

== History ==
Egyptian	Phoenician gaml	Western Greek Gamma	Etruscan C	Old Latin C (G)	Latin C
T14	Phoenician gimel	Greek Gamma	Etruscan C	Old Latin	Latin C

"C" comes from the same letter as "G". The Semites named it gimel. The sign is possibly adapted from an Egyptian hieroglyph for a staff sling, which may have been the meaning of the name gimel. Another possibility is that it depicted a camel, the Semitic name for which was gamal. Barry B. Powell, a specialist in the history of writing, states "It is hard to imagine how gimel = "camel" can be derived from the picture of a camel (it may show his hump, or his head and neck!)".

In the Etruscan language, plosive consonants had no contrastive voicing, so the Greek 'Γ' (Gamma) was adopted into the Etruscan alphabet to represent /k/. Already in the Western Greek alphabet, Gamma first took a '' form in Early Etruscan, then '' in Classical Etruscan. In Latin, it eventually took the 'c' form in Classical Latin. In the earliest Latin inscriptions, the letters 'c k q' were used to represent the sounds /k/ and /ɡ/ (which were not differentiated in writing). Of these, 'q' was used to represent /k/ or /ɡ/ before a rounded vowel, 'k' before 'a', and 'c' elsewhere. During the 3rd century BC, a modified character was introduced for /ɡ/, and 'c' itself was retained for /k/. The use of 'c' (and its variant 'g') replaced most usages of 'k' and 'q'. Hence, in the classical period and after, 'g' was treated as the equivalent of Greek gamma, and 'c' as the equivalent of kappa; this shows in the romanization of Greek words, as in 'ΚΑΔΜΟΣ', 'ΚΥΡΟΣ', and 'ΦΩΚΙΣ' came into Latin as 'cadmvs', 'cyrvs' and 'phocis', respectively.

Other alphabets have letters homoglyphic to 'c' but not analogous in use and derivation, like the Cyrillic letter Es (С, с) which derives from the lunate sigma.

=== Later use ===
When the Roman alphabet was introduced into Britain, ⟨c⟩ represented only /k/, and this value of the letter has been retained in loanwords to all the insular Celtic languages: in Welsh, Irish, and Gaelic, ⟨c⟩ represents only /k/. The Old English Latin-based writing system was learned from the Celts, apparently of Ireland; hence, ⟨c⟩ in Old English also originally represented /k/; the Modern English words kin, break, broken, thick, and seek all come from Old English words written with ⟨c⟩: cyn, brecan, brocen, þicc, and séoc. However, during the course of the Old English period, /k/ before front vowels (/e/ and /i/) was palatalized, having changed by the tenth century to [tʃ], though ⟨c⟩ was still used, as in cir(i)ce, wrecc(e)a. On the continent, meanwhile, a similar phonetic change before the same two vowels had also been going on in almost all of the Romance languages (for example, in Italian).

In Vulgar Latin, /k/ became palatalized to [tʃ] in Italy and Dalmatia; in France and the Iberian Peninsula, it became [ts]. Yet for these new sounds, ⟨c⟩ was still used before the letters ⟨e⟩ and ⟨i⟩. The letter thus represented two distinct values. Subsequently, the Latin phoneme /k^{w}/ (spelled ⟨qv⟩) de-labialized to /k/, meaning that the various Romance languages had /k/ before front vowels. In addition, Norman used the letter ⟨k⟩ so that the sound /k/ could be represented by either ⟨k⟩ or ⟨c⟩, the latter of which could represent either /k/ or /ts/ depending on whether it preceded a front vowel letter or not. The convention of using both ⟨c⟩ and ⟨k⟩ was applied to the writing of English after the Norman Conquest, causing a considerable re-spelling of the Old English words. Thus, while Old English candel, clif, corn, crop, and cú, remained unchanged, cent, cǣᵹ (cēᵹ), cyng, brece, and sēoce, were now (without any change of sound) spelled Kent, keȝ, kyng, breke, and seoke; even cniht ('knight') was subsequently changed to kniht, and þic ('thick') was changed to thik or thikk. The Old English ⟨cw⟩ was also at length displaced by the French ⟨qu⟩ so that the Old English cwēn ('queen') and cwic ('quick') became Middle English quen and quik, respectively.

The sound [tʃ], to which Old English palatalized /k/ had advanced, also occurred in French, chiefly from Latin /k/ before ⟨a⟩. In French, it was represented by the digraph ⟨ch⟩, as in champ (from Latin camp-um), and this spelling was introduced into English: the Hatton Gospels, written c. 1160, have in Matt. i-iii, child, chyld, riche, and mychel, for the cild, rice, and mycel of the Old English version whence they were copied. In these cases, the Old English ⟨c⟩ gave way to ⟨k⟩, ⟨qu⟩ and ⟨ch⟩; on the other hand, ⟨c⟩ in its new value of /ts/ appeared largely in French words like processiun, emperice, and grace and was also substituted for ⟨ts⟩ in a few Old English words, as miltse, bletsien, in early Middle English milce, blecien. By the end of the thirteenth century, both in France and England, this sound /ts/ was de-affricated to /s/; and from that time, ⟨c⟩ has represented /s/ before front vowels either for etymological reasons, as in lance, cent, or to avoid the ambiguity due to the "etymological" use of ⟨s⟩ for /z/, as in ace, mice, once, pence, defence.

Thus, to show etymology, English spelling has advise, devise (instead of *advize, *devize), while advice, device, dice, ice, mice, twice, etc., do not reflect etymology; example has extended this to hence, pence, defence, etc., where there is no etymological reason for using ⟨c⟩. Former generations also wrote sence for sense. Hence, today, the Romance languages and English have a common feature inherited from Vulgar Latin spelling conventions where ⟨c⟩ takes on either a "hard" or "soft" value depending on the following letter.

== Use in writing systems ==
Pronunciation of ⟨c⟩ by language
Orthography	Phonemes	Environment
Afar	/ħ/	
Albanian	/ts/	
Cypriot Arabic	/ʕ/	
Azeri	/dʒ/	
Berber	/ʃ/	
Bukawa	/ʔ/	
Catalan	/k/	Except before e, i
Catalan	/s/	Before e, i
Standard Chinese (Pinyin)	/tsʰ/	
Crimean Tatar	/dʒ/	
Cornish (Standard Written Form)	/s/	
Czech	/ts/	
Danish	/k/	Except before e, i, y, æ, ø
Danish	/s/	Before e, i, y, æ, ø
Dutch	/k/	Except before e, i, y
Dutch	/s/	Before e, i, y
Dutch	/tʃ/	Before e, i in loanwords from Italian
English	/k/	Except before e, i, y
English	/s/	Before e, i, y
English	/ʃ/	Before ea, ia, ie, io, iu
Esperanto	/ts/	
Fijian	/ð/	
Filipino	/k/	Except before e, i
Filipino	/s/	Before e, i
French	/k/	Except before e, i, y
French	/s/	Before e, i, y
Fula	/tʃ/	
Gagauz	/dʒ/	
Galician	/k/	Except before e, i
Galician	/θ/ or /s/	Before e, i
German	/k/	Except before ä, e, i, ö, ü, y in loanwords and names
German	/ts/	Before ä, e, i, ö, ü, y in loanwords and names
Hausa	/tʃ/	
Hungarian	/ts/	
Indonesian	/tʃ/	
Irish	/k/	Except before e, i; or after i
Irish	/c/	Before e, i; or after i
Italian	/k/	Except before e, i
Italian	/tʃ/	Before e, i
Khmer (ALA-LC)	/c/	
Kurmanji (Hawar)	/dʒ/	
Latin	/k/ (and /g/ in early Latin)	
Latvian	/ts/	
Malay	/tʃ/	
Manding	/tʃ/	
Norwegian	/k/	Except before e, i, y, æ, ø in loanwords and names
Norwegian	/s/	Before e, i, y, æ, ø in loanwords and names
Polish	/ts/	Except before i
Polish	/tɕ/	Before i
Portuguese	/k/	Except before e, i
Portuguese	/s/	Before e, i
Romanian	/k/	Except before e, i
Romanian	/tʃ/	Before e, i
Romansh	/k/	Except before e, i
Romansh	/ts/	Before e, i
Scottish Gaelic	/kʰ/	Except before e, i; or after i
Scottish Gaelic	/kʰʲ/	Before e, i; or after i
Serbo-Croatian	/ts/	
Slovak	/ts/	
Slovene	/ts/	
Somali	/ʕ/	
Spanish	/k/	Except before e, i, y
Spanish	/θ/ or /s/	Before e, i, y
Swedish	/k/	Except before e, i, y, ä, ö
Swedish	/s/	Before e, i, y, ä, ö
Tajik	/tʃ/	
Tatar	/ʑ/	
Turkish	/dʒ/	
Valencian	/k/	Except before e, i
Valencian	/s/	Before e, i
Vietnamese	/k/	Except word-finally
Vietnamese	/k̚/	Word-finally
Welsh	/k/	
Xhosa	/ǀ/	
Yabem	/ʔ/	
Yup'ik	/tʃ/	
Zulu	/ǀ/ (a click)	

=== English ===
In English orthography, ⟨c⟩ generally represents the "soft" value of /s/ before the letters ⟨e⟩ (including the Latin-derived digraphs ⟨ae⟩ and ⟨oe⟩, or the corresponding ligatures ⟨æ⟩ and ⟨œ⟩), ⟨i⟩, and ⟨y⟩, and a "hard" value of /k/ before any other letters or at the end of a word. However, there are a number of exceptions in English: "soccer", "celt" and "sceptic" are words that have /k/ where /s/ would be expected. The "soft" ⟨c⟩ may represent the /ʃ/ sound in the digraph ⟨ci⟩ when this precedes a vowel, as in the words 'delicious' and 'appreciate', and also in the word "ocean" and its derivatives.

The digraph ⟨ch⟩ most commonly represents /tʃ/, but can also represent /k/ (mainly in words of Greek origin) or /ʃ/ (mainly in words of French origin). For some dialects of English, it may also represent /x/ in words like loch, while other speakers pronounce the final sound as /k/. The trigraph ⟨tch⟩ always represents /tʃ/. The digraph ⟨ck⟩ is often used to represent the sound /k/ after short vowels, like in "wicket".

C is the twelfth most frequently used letter in the English language (after E, T, A, O, I, N, S, H, R, D, and L), with a frequency of about 2.8% in words.

=== Other languages ===
In the Romance languages French, Spanish, Italian, Romanian, Catalan, and Portuguese, ⟨c⟩ generally has a "hard" value of /k/ and a "soft" value whose pronunciation varies by language. In French, Portuguese, Catalan, and Spanish from Latin America and some places in Spain, the soft ⟨c⟩ value is /s/ as it is in English. In the Spanish spoken in most of Spain, the soft ⟨c⟩ is a voiceless dental fricative /θ/. In Italian and Romanian, the soft ⟨c⟩ is [t͡ʃ].

Germanic languages usually use ⟨c⟩ for Romance loans or digraphs, such as ⟨ch⟩ and ⟨ck⟩, but the rules vary across languages. Of all the Germanic languages, only English uses the initial ⟨c⟩ in native Germanic words like come. Other than English, Dutch uses ⟨c⟩ the most, for most Romance loans and the digraph ⟨ch⟩. German uses ⟨c⟩ in the digraphs ⟨ch⟩ and ⟨ck⟩, and the trigraph ⟨sch⟩, but by itself only in unassimilated loanwords and proper names. Danish keeps soft ⟨c⟩ in Romance words but changes hard ⟨c⟩ to ⟨k⟩. Swedish has the same rules for soft and hard ⟨c⟩ as Danish, and also uses ⟨c⟩ in the digraph ⟨ck⟩ and the very common word och, "and". Norwegian, Afrikaans, and Icelandic are the most restrictive, replacing all cases of ⟨c⟩ with ⟨k⟩ or ⟨s⟩, and reserving ⟨c⟩ for unassimilated loanwords and names.

All Balto-Slavic languages that use the Latin alphabet, as well as Albanian, Hungarian, Pashto, several Sami languages, Esperanto, Ido, Interlingua, and Americanist phonetic notation (and those aboriginal languages of North America whose practical orthography derives from it), use ⟨c⟩ to represent /t͡s/, the voiceless alveolar or voiceless dental sibilant affricate. In Hanyu Pinyin, the standard romanization of Mandarin Chinese, the letter represents an aspirated version of this sound, /t͡s^{h}/.

Among non-European languages that have adopted the Latin alphabet, ⟨c⟩ represents a variety of sounds. Yup'ik, Indonesian, Malay, and a number of African languages such as Hausa, Fula, and Manding share the soft Italian value of /t͡ʃ/. In Azeri, Crimean Tatar, Kurmanji Kurdish, and Turkish, ⟨c⟩ stands for the voiced counterpart of this sound, the voiced postalveolar affricate /d͡ʒ/. In Yabem and similar languages, such as Bukawa, ⟨c⟩ stands for a glottal stop /ʔ/. Xhosa and Zulu use this letter to represent the click /ǀ/. In some other African languages, such as Berber languages, ⟨c⟩ is used for /ʃ/. In Fijian, ⟨c⟩ stands for a voiced dental fricative /ð/, while in Somali it has the value of /ʕ/.

The letter ⟨c⟩ is also used as a transliteration of Cyrillic ⟨ц⟩ in the Latin forms of Serbian, Macedonian, and sometimes Ukrainian, along with the digraph ⟨ts⟩.

=== Other systems ===
As a phonetic symbol, lowercase ⟨c⟩ is the International Phonetic Alphabet (IPA) and X-SAMPA symbol for the voiceless palatal plosive, and capital ⟨C⟩ is the X-SAMPA symbol for the voiceless palatal fricative.

=== Digraphs ===
There are several common digraphs with ⟨c⟩, the most common being ⟨ch⟩, which in some languages (such as German) is far more common than ⟨c⟩ alone. ⟨ch⟩ takes various values in other languages.

As in English, ⟨ck⟩, with the value /k/, is often used after short vowels in other Germanic languages such as German and Swedish (other Germanic languages, such as Dutch and Norwegian, use ⟨kk⟩ instead). The digraph ⟨cz⟩ is found in Polish and ⟨cs⟩ in Hungarian, representing /t͡ʂ/ and /t͡ʃ/ respectively. The digraph ⟨sc⟩ represents /ʃ/ in Old English, Italian, and a few languages related to Italian (where this only happens before front vowels, while otherwise it represents /sk/). The trigraph ⟨sch⟩ represents /ʃ/ in German.

== Other uses ==
- In the hexadecimal (base 16) numbering system, C is a number that corresponds to the number 12 in decimal (base 10) counting.
- In the Roman numeral system, C represents 100.
- Unit prefix c, meaning one hundredth.

== Related characters ==
=== Ancestors, descendants and siblings ===
A curled C in the coat of arms of Porvoo

- ⟨𐤂⟩ : Semitic letter Gimel, from which the following symbols originally derive:
  - ⟨Γ⟩ ⟨γ⟩ : Greek letter Gamma, from which ⟨C⟩ derives
    - ⟨G⟩ ⟨g⟩ : Latin letter ⟨G⟩, which is derived from Latin ⟨C⟩
      - ⟨Ȝ⟩ ⟨ȝ⟩ : Latin letter Yogh, which is derived from Latin ⟨G⟩
- Phonetic alphabet symbols related to ⟨C⟩:
  - ⟨ɕ⟩ : Small ⟨c⟩ with curl
  - ⟨ʗ⟩ : Stretched ⟨c⟩
  - ⟨𝼏⟩ : Stretched ⟨c⟩ with curl – Used by Douglas Beach for a nasal click in his phonetic description of Khoekhoe.
  - ⟨𝼝⟩ : Small letter ⟨c⟩ with retroflex hook – Para-IPA version of the IPA retroflex tʂ.
  - ⟨ꟲ⟩ : Modifier letter capital ⟨c⟩ – Used to mark tone for the Chatino orthography in Oaxaca, Mexico; used as a generic transcription for a falling tone; also used in para-IPA notation.
- ⟨ᶜ⟩ : Modifier letter small c
- ⟨ᶝ⟩ : Modifier letter small ⟨c⟩ with curl
- ⟨ᴄ⟩ : Small capital ⟨c⟩ is used in the Uralic Phonetic Alphabet.
- ⟨Ꞔ⟩ ⟨ꞔ⟩ : ⟨C⟩ with palatal hook, used for writing Mandarin Chinese using the early draft version of pinyin romanization during the mid-1950s.
- ⟨C⟩ with diacritics: Ć ć Ĉ ĉ Č č Ċ ċ Ḉ ḉ Ƈ ƈ C̈ c̈ Ȼ ȼ Ç ç Ꞔ ꞔ Ꞓ ꞓ
- ⟨Ↄ⟩ ⟨ↄ⟩ : Claudian letters

=== Derived ligatures, abbreviations, signs and symbols ===
- © : copyright symbol
- °C : degree Celsius
- ¢ : cent
- ₡ : colón (currency)
- ₢ : Brazilian cruzeiro (currency)
- ₵ : Ghana cedi (currency)
- ₠ : European Currency Unit CE
- $\mathbb{C}$ : blackboard bold C, denoting the complex numbers
- ℭ : blackletter C
- Ꜿ ꜿ : Medieval abbreviation for Latin syllables con- and com-, and Portuguese -us and -os.
- 𝾐: Historical mathematical symbol for the cube of the unknown (U+1DF90 𝾐 LATIN SMALL LETTER C WITH LOW SLASH)
- 𝾑: Historical mathematical symbol for the square of the unknown (U+1DF91 𝾑 LATIN SMALL LETTER C WITH LOOPED CEDILLA)
- 𝾒: Historical mathematical symbol for the cube of the unknown (U+1DF92 𝾒 LATIN SMALL LETTER C WITH RIGHT LOOP)

== Other representations ==
=== Computing ===
The Latin letters ⟨C⟩ and ⟨c⟩ have Unicode encodings U+0043 C LATIN CAPITAL LETTER C and U+0063 c LATIN SMALL LETTER C. These are the same code points as those used in ASCII and ISO 8859. There are also precomposed character encodings for ⟨C⟩ and ⟨c⟩ with diacritics, for most of those listed above; the remainder are produced using combining diacritics.

Variant forms of the letter have unique code points for specialist use: the alphanumeric symbols set in mathematics and science, voiceless palatal sounds in linguistics, and halfwidth and fullwidth forms for legacy CJK font compatibility. The Cyrillic homoglyph of the Latin ⟨C⟩ has a separate encoding: U+0421 С CYRILLIC CAPITAL LETTER ES.

=== Other ===
NATO phonetic	Morse code
Charlie	▄▄▄ ▄ ▄▄▄ ▄

Signal flag

Flag semaphore
American manual alphabet (ASL fingerspelling)
British manual alphabet (BSL fingerspelling)
Braille dots-14
Unified English Braille

== See also ==
- Hard and soft C
- Speed of light, c
