= S =

Nineteenth letter of the Latin alphabet

- S s
- ſ

Usage
- Writing system: Latin script
- Type: Alphabetic and logographic
- Language of origin: Latin language
- Sound values: [s]; [z]; [ʃ]; [θ]; [ts]; [ʒ]
- In Unicode: U+0053, U+0073
- Alphabetical position: 19

History
Development
Aa32M40
        - Σ σ ς
          - 𐌔
            - S s
- Time period: c. 700 BCE to present
- Descendants: ſ; ß; Ƨ; Ꞅ; $; ₷; §; ℠; ᛋ; ∫
- Sisters: Ѕ ѕ; С с; Ш ш; Щ щ; Ҫ ҫ; Ԍ ԍ; ש; ش; ܫ; س; ࠔ; 𐎘; 𐡔; ሠ; ㅅ (disputed); Ս ս; श; स; શ; સ
- Variations: ſ

Other
- Associated graphs: s(x), sh, sz
- Writing direction: Left-to-right

S (minuscule: s) is the nineteenth letter of the Latin alphabet, used in the English alphabet, the alphabets of other western European languages and other Latin alphabets worldwide. Its name in English is ess (Note: Spelled 'es'- in compound words) (pronounced /ˈɛs/), plural esses.

== History ==
Proto-Sinaitic Shin	Phoenician Shin	Western Greek Sigma	Etruscan S	Latin S

Northwest Semitic šîn represented a voiceless postalveolar fricative /ʃ/ (as in 'ship'). It originated most likely as a pictogram of a tooth (שנא) and represented the phoneme /ʃ/ via the acrophonic principle.

Ancient Greek did not have a /ʃ/ "sh" phoneme, so the derived Greek letter Sigma (Σ) came to represent the voiceless alveolar sibilant /s/. While the letter shape Σ continues Phoenician šîn, its name sigma is taken from the letter Samekh, while the shape and position of samekh but name of šîn is continued in the xi. Within Greek, the name of sigma was influenced by its association with the Greek word σίζω (earlier *sigj-), "to hiss". The original name of the letter "Sigma" may have been san, but due to the early history of the Greek epichoric alphabets, "san" came to be identified as a separate letter, Ϻ. Herodotus reported that "san" was the name given by the Dorians to the same letter called "Sigma" by the Ionians.

The Western Greek alphabet used in Cumae was adopted by the Etruscans and Latins in the 7th century BC, and over the following centuries, it developed into a range of Old Italic alphabets, including the Etruscan alphabet and the early Latin alphabet. In Etruscan, the value /s/ of Greek sigma (𐌔) was maintained, while san (𐌑) represented a separate phoneme, most likely /ʃ/ "sh" (transliterated as ś). The early Latin alphabet adopted sigma, but not san, as Old Latin did not have a /ʃ/ "sh" phoneme.

The shape of Latin S arises from Greek Σ by dropping one out of the four strokes of that letter. The (angular) S-shape composed of three strokes existed as a variant of the four-stroke letter Σ already in the epigraphy of Western Greek alphabets, and the three and four strokes variants existed alongside one another in the classical Etruscan alphabet. In other Italic alphabets (Venetic, Lepontic), the letter could be represented as a zig-zagging line of any number between three and six strokes. The Italic letter was also adopted into Elder Futhark, as Sowilō (ᛊ), and appears with four to eight strokes in the earliest runic inscriptions, but is occasionally reduced to three strokes (ᛋ) from the later 5th century, and appears regularly with three strokes in Younger Futhark.

The ⟨sh⟩ digraph for English /ʃ/ arose in Middle English (alongside ⟨sch⟩), replacing the Old English ⟨sc⟩ digraph. Similarly, Old High German ⟨sc⟩ was replaced by ⟨sch⟩ in Early Modern High German orthography.

=== Long s ===
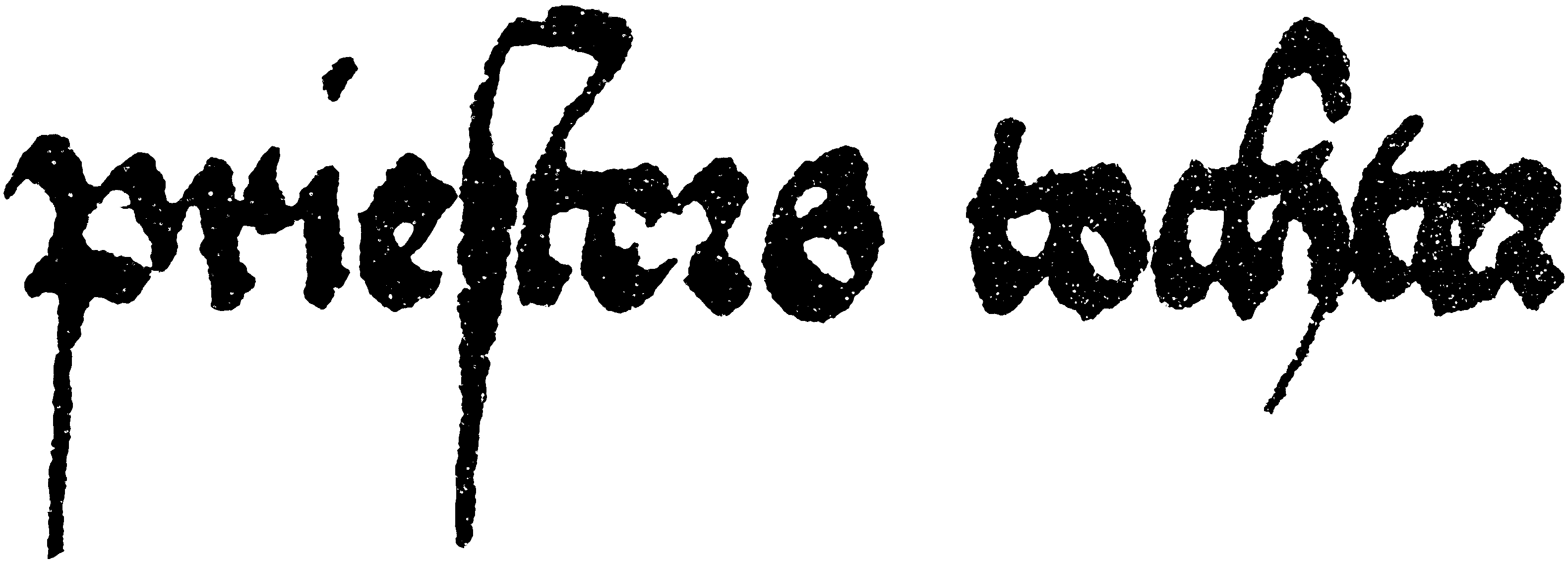
Late medieval German script (Swabian bastarda, dated 1496) illustrating the use of long and round s: prieſters tochter ("priest's daughter").

The minuscule form ſ, called the long s, developed in the early medieval period, within the Visigothic and Carolingian hands, with predecessors in the half-uncial and cursive scripts of Late Antiquity. It remained standard in western writing throughout the medieval period and was adopted in early printing with movable types. It existed alongside minuscule "round" or "short" s, which were at the time only used at the end of words.

In most Western orthographies, the ſ gradually fell out of use during the second half of the 18th century, although it remained in occasional use into the 19th century. In Spain, the change was mainly accomplished between 1760 and 1766. In France, the change occurred between 1782 and 1793. Printers in the United States stopped using the long s between 1795 and 1810. In English orthography, the London printer John Bell (1745–1831) pioneered the change. His edition of Shakespeare, in 1785, was advertised with the claim that he "ventured to depart from the common mode by rejecting the long 'ſ' in favor of the round one, as being less liable to error....." The Times of London made the switch from the long to the short s with its issue of 10 September 1803. Encyclopædia Britannica's 5th edition, completed in 1817, was the last edition to use the long s.

In German orthography, long s was retained in Fraktur (Schwabacher) type as well as in standard cursive (Sütterlin) well into the 20th century, until official use of that typeface was abolished in 1941. The ligature of ſs (or ſz) was retained; however, it gave rise to the Eszett ⟨ß⟩ in contemporary German orthography.

== Use in writing systems ==
Pronunciation of ⟨s⟩ by language
Orthography	Phonemes
Catalan	/s/, /z/
Standard Chinese (Pinyin)	/s/
English	/s/, /z/, silent
French	/s/, /z/, silent
German	/z/, /s/, /ʃ/
Hungarian	/ʃ/
Portuguese	/s/, /z/, /ʃ/, /ʒ/
Spanish	/s/
Turkish	/s/

=== English ===
In English, ⟨s⟩ represents a voiceless alveolar sibilant /s/. It also commonly represents a voiced alveolar sibilant /z/, as in 'rose' and 'bands'. Due to yod-coalescence, it may also represent a voiceless palato-alveolar fricative /ʃ/, as in 'sugar', or a voiced palato-alveolar fricative /ʒ/, as in 'measure'.

Final ⟨s⟩ is the usual mark for plural nouns. It is the regular ending of English third person present tense verbs.

In some words of French origin, ⟨s⟩ is silent, as in 'isle' or 'debris'.

The letter ⟨s⟩ is the seventh most common letter in English and the third-most common consonant after ⟨t⟩ and ⟨n⟩. It is the most common letter for the first letter of a word in the English language.

=== German ===
In German, ⟨s⟩ represents:

- A voiced alveolar sibilant /z/ before vowels (except after obstruents), as in 'sich'.
- A voiceless alveolar sibilant /s/ before consonants or when final, as in 'ist' and 'das'.
- A voiceless palato-alveolar fricative /ʃ/ before ⟨p, t⟩ at the beginning of a word or syllable, as in 'spät' and 'Stadt'.

When doubled (⟨ss⟩), it represents a voiceless alveolar sibilant /s/, as in 'müssen'.

In the trigraph ⟨sch⟩, it represents a voiceless palato-alveolar fricative /ʃ/, as in 'schon'.

=== Other languages ===
In most languages that use the Latin alphabet, ⟨s⟩ represents the voiceless alveolar or voiceless dental sibilant /s/.

In many Romance languages, it also represents the voiced alveolar or voiced dental sibilant /z/, as in Portuguese mesa (table).

In Portuguese, it may represent the voiceless palato-alveolar fricative /ʃ/ in most dialects when syllable-final, and [ʒ] in European Portuguese Islão (Islam) or, in many sociolects of Brazilian Portuguese, esdrúxulo (proparoxytone). However, when the next word starts with a vowel, this /ʃ/ is turned into [z] in all dialects. The former stadium of FC Porto, Estádio das Antas, was sometimes mispronounced with three instances of [ʃ] by foreign commentators, while the native pronunciation is [ɨʃˈtaðju ðɐz ˈɐ̃tɐʃ] (where a phonetic [ʃ] appears before a consonant and a pause, respectively). In Brazilian dialects without the retraction, ⟨s⟩ in das is pronounced the same in this phrase, [isˈtadʒiu daz ˈɐ̃tɐs], with differences lying elsewhere.

In some Andalusian dialects of Spanish, it merged with Peninsular Spanish ⟨c⟩ and ⟨z⟩ and is now pronounced /θ/.

In Hungarian, it represents /ʃ/.

In Turkmen, it represents /θ/.

In several Western Romance languages, like Spanish and French, the final ⟨s⟩ is the usual mark of plural nouns.

=== Other systems ===
In the International Phonetic Alphabet, ⟨s⟩ represents the voiceless alveolar sibilant /s/.

== Other uses ==
- Used in a chemical formula to represent sulfur. For example, SO_{2} is sulfur dioxide.
- Used in the preferred IUPAC name for a chemical to indicate a specific enantiomer. For example, "(S)-2-(4-Chloro-2-methylphenoxy)propanoic acid" is one of the enantiomers of mecoprop.

== Related characters ==
=== Descendants and related characters in the Latin alphabet ===
- ſ : Latin letter long s, an obsolete variant of s
- ẜ ẝ : Various forms of long s were used for medieval scribal abbreviations.
- ẞ ß : German Eszett or "sharp S", derived from a ligature of long s followed by either s or z
- S with diacritics: Ś ś Ṡ ṡ ẛ Ṩ ṩ Ṥ ṥ Ṣ ṣ S̩ s̩ Ꞩ ꞩ Ꟊ ꟊ Ꟍ ꟍ Ŝ ŝ Ṧ ṧ Š š Ş ş Ș ș S̈ s̈ ᶊ Ȿ ȿ ᵴ ᶳ
- ₛ : Subscript small s was used in the Uralic Phonetic Alphabet prior to its formal standardization in 1902.
- ˢ : Modifier letter small s is used for phonetic transcription.
- ꜱ : Small capital S was used in the Icelandic First Grammatical Treatise to mark gemination.
- ꟱ : Modifier letter capital S is used as a phonetic and phonemic wildcard. It is also used as a tone sandhi letter in Western Highlands Chatino of Oaxaca.
- Ʂ ʂ : S with hook, used for writing Mandarin Chinese using the early draft version of pinyin romanization during the mid-1950s
- Ƨ ƨ : Latin letter reversed S (used in Zhuang transliteration)
- 𝼩 : Latin small letter s with mid-height left hook was used by the British and Foreign Bible Society in the early 20th century for romanization of the Malayalam language.
- IPA-specific symbols related to S: ʃ ɧ ʂ
- Para-IPA version of the IPA fricative ɕ: 𝼞 𐞺
- Ꞅ ꞅ : Insular S
- Ꟗ ꟗ : Used in Middle Scots
- Ꟙ ꟙ : Latin letter Sigmoid S was used in medieval palaeography

=== Derived signs, symbols, and abbreviations ===
A letter S in the coat of arms of Sortavala

- $ : Dollar sign
- ₷ : Spesmilo
- § : Section sign
- ℠ : Service mark symbol
- ∫ : Integral symbol, short for summation (derived from long s)

=== Ancestors and siblings in other alphabets ===
- 𐤔 : Semitic letter Shin, from which the following symbols originally derive:
  - archaic Greek Sigma could be written with different numbers of angles and strokes. Besides the classical form with four strokes, a three-stroke form resembling an angular Latin S was commonly found, and was particularly characteristic of some mainland Greek varieties, including the Attic and several "red" alphabets.
    - Σ: classical Greek letter Sigma
      - Ϲ ϲ: Greek lunate sigma
        - Ⲥ ⲥ : Coptic letter sima
        - С с : Cyrillic letter Es, derived from a form of sigma
    - 𐌔 : Old Italic letter S, includes the variants also found in the archaic Greek letter
      - S: Latin letter S
      - ᛊ, ᛋ, ᛌ : Runic letter sowilo, which is derived from Old Italic S
    - 𐍃: Gothic letter sigil
- Ս : Armenian letter Se

== Other representations ==
=== Computing ===
- U+0053 S LATIN CAPITAL LETTER S
- U+0073 s LATIN SMALL LETTER S
- U+FF33 Ｓ FULLWIDTH LATIN CAPITAL LETTER S
- U+FF53 ｓ FULLWIDTH LATIN SMALL LETTER S

=== Other representations ===
NATO phonetic	Morse code
Sierra	▄ ▄ ▄

Signal flag

Flag semaphore
American manual alphabet (ASL fingerspelling)
British manual alphabet (BSL fingerspelling)
Braille dots-234
Unified English Braille

== See also ==
- Cool S
- Ⓢ in Enclosed Alphanumerics
