= Two dots (diacritic) =

Diacritic that consists of two dots placed over a letter

◌̈ ◌̤o

Two dots
- U+0308 ◌̈ COMBINING DIAERESIS (Note: The diacritic is referred to in Unicode as a diaeresis, without distinction, although the term has a more precise literary meaning.); U+0324 ◌̤ COMBINING DIAERESIS BELOW; U+07F3 ߳ NKO COMBINING DOUBLE DOT ABOVE

Diacritical marks of two dots ¨, placed side-by-side over or under a letter, are used in several languages for several different purposes. The most familiar to English-language speakers are the diaeresis and the umlaut, though there are numerous others. For example, in Albanian, ë represents a schwa. Such diacritics are also sometimes used for stylistic reasons (as in the family name Brontë or the band name Mötley Crüe).

In modern computer systems using Unicode, the two-dot diacritics are almost always encoded identically, having the same code point. For example, U+00F6 ö LATIN SMALL LETTER O WITH DIAERESIS represents both o-umlaut and o-diaeresis. Their appearance in print or on screen may vary between typefaces but rarely within the same typeface.

The word trema (French: tréma), used in linguistics and also classical scholarship, describes the form of both the umlaut diacritic and the diaeresis rather than their function and is used in those contexts to refer to either.

== Uses ==
=== Diaeresis ===
As the "diaeresis" diacritic, it is used to mark the separation of two distinct vowels in adjacent syllables when an instance of diaeresis (or hiatus) occurs, so as to distinguish from a digraph or diphthong. For example, in the obsolete spelling coöperate, the diaeresis reminded the reader that the word has four syllables co-op-er-ate, not three. It is used in several languages of western and southern Europe, though rarely now in English. One well-known usage is in French: the diaeresis is obligatory in naïve to show that the pronunciation is [na.iv], not [nɛv].

=== Umlaut ===
As the "umlaut" diacritic, it indicates a sound shift – also known as umlaut – in which a back vowel becomes a front vowel. It is a specific feature of German and other Germanic languages, affecting the graphemes ⟨a⟩, ⟨o⟩, ⟨u⟩ and ⟨au⟩, which are modified to ⟨ä⟩, ⟨ö⟩, ⟨ü⟩ and ⟨äu⟩.

It can be seen in the Sütterlin script, formerly used widely in German handwriting, in which the letter e is formed as two short parallel vertical lines very close together (see under Sütterlin#Characteristics).

=== Stylistic use ===
The two dot diacritic is also sometimes used for purely stylistic reasons. For example, the Brontë family's surname was derived from Gaelic and had been anglicised as "Prunty", or "Brunty", but at some point, the father of the sisters, Patrick Brontë (born Brunty), decided on the alternative spelling with a diaeresis diacritic over the terminal ⟨e⟩ to indicate that the name had two syllables.

Similarly, the "metal umlaut" is a diacritic that is sometimes used gratuitously or decoratively over letters in the names of hard rock or heavy metal bands – for example, those of Motörhead and Mötley Crüe, and of parody bands, such as Spın̈al Tap.

=== Other uses by language ===
A double dot is also used as a diacritic in cases where it functions as neither a diaeresis nor an umlaut. In the International Phonetic Alphabet (IPA), a double dot above a letter is used for a centralized vowel, a situation more similar to umlaut than to diaeresis. In other languages it is used for vowel length, nasalization, tone, and various other uses where diaeresis or umlaut was available typographically. The IPA uses a double dot below a letter to indicate breathy (murmured) voice. (Note: The IPA Handbook calls the mark "subscript umlaut", in contrast with the Unicode Consortium's choice of "diaeresis below".)

==== Vowels ====
- In Albanian, Tagalog, Kashubian, and Luxembourgish ⟨ë⟩ represents a schwa [ə].
- In Aymara, a double dot is used on ⟨ä⟩ ⟨ï⟩ ⟨ü⟩ for vowel length.
- In the Basque dialect of Soule, ⟨ü⟩ represents [y]
- In the DMG romanization of Tunisian Arabic, ⟨ä⟩, ⟨ö⟩, ⟨ṏ⟩, ⟨ü⟩, and ⟨ṻ⟩ represent [æ], [œ], [œ̃], [y], and [y:].
- In Ligurian official orthography, ⟨ö⟩ is used to represent the sound [oː].
- In Māori, a diaeresis (e.g. wähine) was often used on computers in the past instead of the macron to indicate long vowels, as the diaeresis was relatively easy to produce on many systems, and the macron difficult or impossible.
- In Seneca, ⟨ë⟩ ⟨ö⟩ are nasal vowels, though ⟨ä⟩ is [ɛ], as in German umlaut.
- In Vurës (Vanuatu), ⟨ë⟩ and ⟨ö⟩ encode respectively [œ] and [ø].
- In the Pahawh Hmong script, a double dot is used as one of several tone marks.
- The double dot was used in the early Cyrillic alphabet, which was used to write Old Church Slavonic. The modern Cyrillic Belarusian and Russian alphabets include the letter ⟨ё⟩ (yo), although replacing it with the letter ⟨е⟩ without the diacritic is allowed in Russian.
- Since the 1870s, ⟨Ї⟩, ⟨ї⟩ (Cyrillic letter yi) has been used in the Ukrainian alphabet for iotated [ji]; plain і is not iotated [i]. In Udmurt, ӥ is used for uniotated [i], with и for iotated [ji].
- The form ⟨ÿ⟩ is common in Dutch handwriting and also occasionally used in printed text – but is a form of the digraph "ij" rather than a modification of the letter ⟨y⟩.
- Komi and Udmurt use ⟨Ӧ⟩ (a Cyrillic O with two dots) for [ə].
- The Swedish, Finnish and Estonian languages use ⟨Ä⟩ and ⟨Ö⟩ to represent [æ] and [ø]
- In the languages of J.R.R. Tolkien's Middle-Earth novels, a diaeresis is used to separate vowels belonging to different syllables (e.g. in Eärendil) and on final e to mark it as not a schwa or silent (e.g. in Manwë, Aulë, Oromë, etc.). (There is no schwa in these languages but Tolkien wanted to make sure that readers wouldn't mistakenly pronounce one when speaking the names aloud.)

==== Consonants ====
Jacaltec (a Mayan language) and Malagasy are among the very few languages with a double dot on the letter "n"; in both, n̈ is the velar nasal [ŋ].

In Udmurt, a double dot is also used with the consonant letters ӝ [dʒ] (from ж [ʒ]), ӟ [dʑ] (from з [z] ~ [ʑ]) and ӵ [tʃ] (from ч [tɕ]).

When distinction is important, Ḧ and ẍ are used for representing [ħ] and [ɣ] in the Kurdish Kurmanji alphabet (which are otherwise represented by "h" and "x"). These sounds are borrowed from Arabic.

Ẅ and ÿ: Ÿ is generally a vowel, but it is used as the (semi-vowel) consonant [ɰ] (a [w] without the use of the lips) in Tlingit. This sound is also found in Coast Tsimshian, where it is written ẅ.

A number of languages in Vanuatu use double dots on consonants, to represent linguolabial (or "apicolabial") phonemes in their orthography. Thus Araki contrasts bilabial p [p] with linguolabial p̈ [t̼]; bilabial m [m] with linguolabial m̈ [n̼]; and bilabial v [β] with linguolabial v̈ [ð̼].

In Arabic the letter ẗ is used in the ISO 233 transliteration for the tāʾ marbūṭah [ة], used to mark feminine gender in nouns and adjectives.

Syriac uses a two dots above a letter, called Siyame, to indicate that the word should be understood as plural. For instance, ܒܝܬܐ (bayta) means "house", while ܒܝ̈ܬܐ (bayte) means "houses". The sign is used especially when no vowel marks are present, which could differentiate between the two forms. Although the origin of the Siyame is different from that of the diaeresis sign, in modern computer systems both are represented by the same Unicode character. This, however, often leads to wrong rendering of the Syriac text.

The N'Ko script, used to write the Mandé languages of West Africa uses a two-dot diacritic (among others) to represent non-native sounds. The dots are slightly larger than those used for diaeresis or umlaut.

==== Diacritic underneath ====
The IPA specifies a "subscript umlaut", for example Hindi [kʊm̤ar] "potter"; the ALA-LC romanization system provides for its use and is one of the main schemes to romanize Persian (for example, rendering ⟨ض⟩ as ⟨z̤⟩). The notation was used to write some Asian languages in Latin script, for example Red Karen.

The double-dot underneath a vowel is still used in Fuzhou romanization of Eastern Min to indicate a modified vowel sound; placing the modifier diacritic underneath the vowel letter makes it easier to combine it with tonal diacritics above the letter, as in the word Mìng-dĕ̤ng-ngṳ̄ ("Eastern Min language").

==== Side dots ====
In historical Hangul punctuation, the diacritics 〮 and 〯 , known as bangjeom or pangchŏm (방점; 傍點), were used to mark supposed tones or pitch accents. They were written to the left of a syllable in vertical writing and above a syllable in horizontal writing.

== Computer encodings ==
=== In Unicode ===
Unicode only contains one code point for each precomposed character with a "two-dot over diacritic", regardless of whether it is used for an umlaut or a diaeresis or for some other purpose, and uses diaeresis in the code point name. The following are provided:

- Diaeresis ◌̈ ◌̤
  Latin: Ä ä
- Ǟ ǟ
- C̈ c̈
- Ë ë
- Ḧ ḧ
- Ï ï
- Ḯ ḯ
- J̈ j̈
- K̈ k̈
- L̈ l̈
- M̈ m̈
- N̈ n̈
- Ö ö
- Ȫ ȫ
- Ǫ̈ ǫ̈
- Ṏ ṏ
- S̈ s̈
- T̈ ẗ
- Ü ü
- Ǖ ǖ
- Ǘ ǘ
- Ǚ ǚ
- Ǜ ǜ
- Ṳ ṳ
- Ṻ ṻ
- ᴞ
- Ẅ ẅ
- Ẍ ẍ
- Ÿ ÿ
  Greek: Ϊ ϊ
- Ϊ́ ΐ
- Ϊ̀ ῒ
- Ϊ͂ ῗ
- Ϋ ϋ
- Ϋ́ ΰ
- Ϋ̀ ῢ
- Ϋ͂ ῧ
- ϔ
  Cyrillic: Ӓ ӓ
- Ё ё
- Ӛ ӛ
- Ӝ ӝ
- Ӟ ӟ
- Ӥ ӥ
- Ї ї
- Ӧ ӧ
- Ӫ ӫ
- Ӱ ӱ
- Ӵ ӵ
- Ӹ ӹ
- Ӭ ӭ

In addition, many more symbols may be composed using the combining character facility, U+0308 ◌̈ COMBINING DIAERESIS, that may be used with any letter or other diacritic to create a customised symbol. When the letter to be accented is an ⟨i⟩, the diacritic replaces the tittle, thus: ⟨ï⟩. Compound diacritics are possible, for example U+01DA ǚ LATIN SMALL LETTER U WITH DIAERESIS AND CARON, used as a tonal marks for Hanyu Pinyin, which uses both a two dots diacritic with a caron diacritic. Conversely,

Sometimes, there's a need to distinguish between the umlaut sign and the diaeresis sign. For instance, either may appear in a German name. ISO/IEC JTC 1/SC 2/WG 2 recommends the following for these cases:

- To represent the umlaut use the Combining Diaeresis (U+0308)
- To represent the diaeresis use Combining Grapheme Joiner (CGJ, U+034F) + Combining Diaeresis (U+0308)

The same advice can be found in the official Unicode FAQ.

Since version 3.2.0, Unicode also provides U+0364 ◌ͤ COMBINING LATIN SMALL LETTER E which can produce the older umlaut typography.

Unicode provides a combining double dot below as U+0324 ◌̤ COMBINING DIAERESIS BELOW.

For use with the N'Ko script, there is U+07F3 ◌߳ NKO COMBINING DOUBLE DOT ABOVE.

For compatibility with legacy character sets there is also a free-standing U+00A8 ¨ DIAERESIS. Presumably this existed for 'backspace and overtype' usage.

=== Pre-Unicode ===
ASCII, a seven-bit code with just 95 "printable" characters, has no provision for any kind of dot diacritic. Subsequent standardisation treated ASCII as the US national variant of ISO/IEC 646: the French, German and other national variants reassigned a few code points to specific vowels with diacritics, as precomposed characters. Some of these variants also defined the sequence e,backspace," as producing ë but few terminals supported this.

The subsequent (eight bit) ISO 8859-1 character encoding includes the letters ä, ë, ï, ö, ü, and their respective capital forms, as well as ÿ in lower case only, with Ÿ added in the revised edition ISO 8859-15 and Windows-1252.

== Computer usage ==
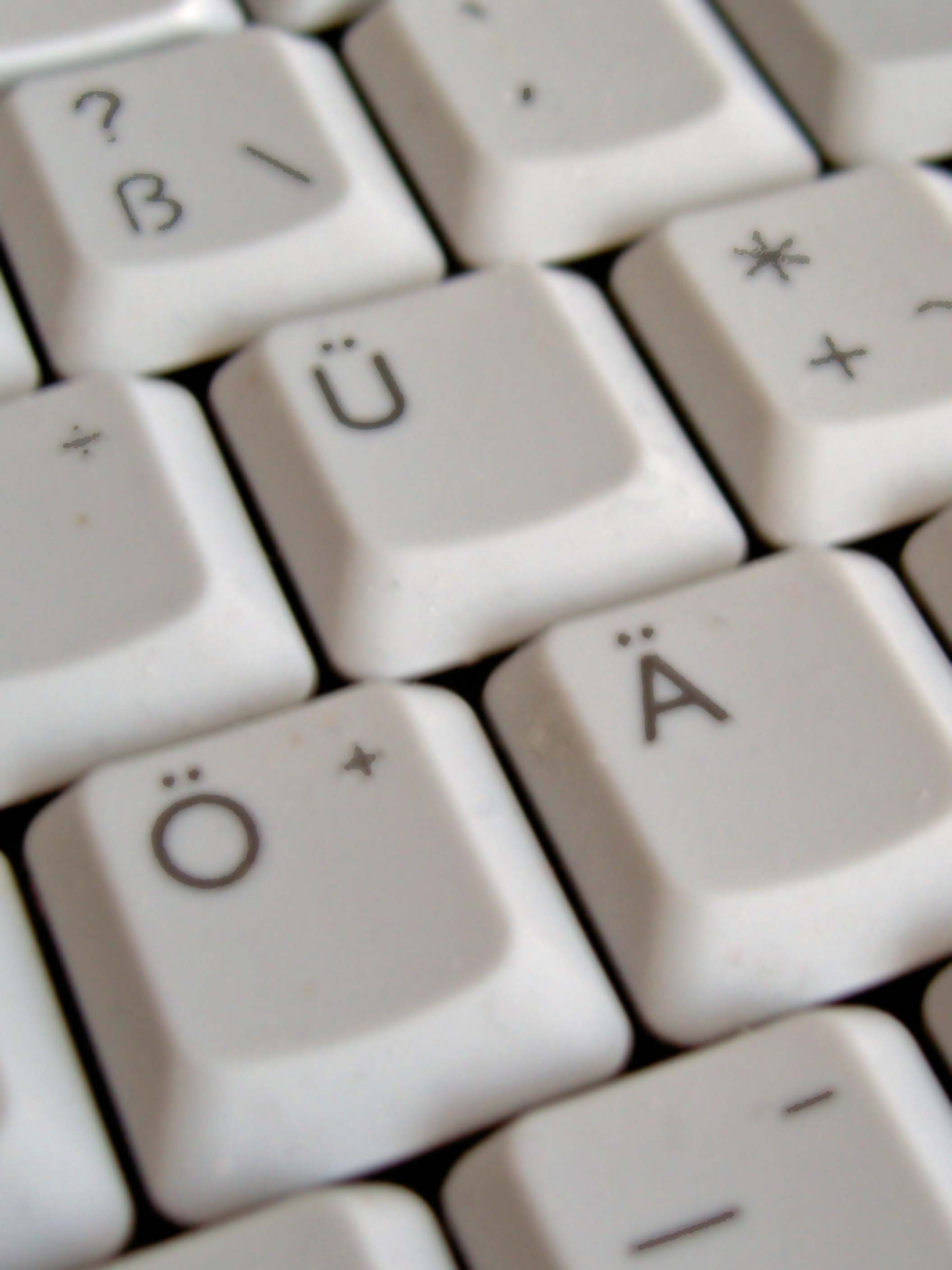
Letters with umlaut on a German computer keyboard.

Character encoding generally treats the umlaut and the diaeresis as the same diacritic mark. Unicode refers to both as diaereses without making any distinction, although the term itself has a more precise literary meaning. For example, U+00F6 ö LATIN SMALL LETTER O WITH DIAERESIS represents both o-umlaut and o-diaeresis, while similar codes are used to represent all such cases.

In countries where the local language(s) routinely include letters with diacritics, local keyboards are typically engraved with those symbols. If letters with double dots are not present on the keyboard, there are a number of ways to input them into a computer system. (For details, see local sources, computer system documentation and the article Unicode input.)

== See also ==
- Dot (diacritic)
- Two dots (disambiguation)
- English terms with diacritical marks
