= Old Italic =

Old Italic may refer to:

- Old Italic scripts
- Old Italic (Unicode block)
- Ancient Italic peoples
- Early (pre-Roman) Italic languages
- Vetus Latina, the "Old Latin" translation of the Christian Bible, occasionally referred to as "Old Italic"
