= S̩ =

Latin letter S with vertical tick below

- S̩ s̩

Usage
- Writing system: Latin
- Type: alphabetic
- Language of origin: Yoruba, International Phonetic Alphabet
- Sound values: [ʃ], [s̩]

History
Development
Aa32M40
        - Σ σ ς
          - ς
            - 𐌔
              - S
                - S s ſ
                  - S̩ s̩

S̩ (minuscule: s̩) is a letter of the Latin alphabet, formed from S with the addition of a vertical line below it. It is used in Yoruba when written in Nigeria to represent the sound [ʃ] (like English "sh").

The line is sometimes replaced by a dot, i.e. Ṣ ṣ.

[s̩] is also the International Phonetic Alphabet symbol for a syllabic "s" sound.

== Computer encoding ==
Unicode does not include precomposed characters for S̩ s̩ — they should be represented with a combining character, which may not align properly or may display as squares in some fonts. Nevertheless, the sequence of base character + combining diacritic is given a unique name. In Unicode:

- S̩: U+0053 S LATIN CAPITAL LETTER S + U+0329 ̩ COMBINING VERTICAL LINE BELOW
- s̩: U+0073 s LATIN SMALL LETTER S + U+0329 ̩ COMBINING VERTICAL LINE BELOW
