= Monogenēs =

Biblical term of Greek origin

Monogenes (μονογενής) has two primary definitions, "pertaining to being the only one of its kind within a specific relationship" and "pertaining to being the only one of its kind or class, unique in kind". Its Greek meaning is often applied to mean "one of a kind, one and only". Monogenēs may be used as an adjective. For example, monogenēs pais means only child, only legitimate child or special child. Monogenēs may also be used on its own as a noun. For example, ὁ μονογενής (ho monogenēs) means "the only one", or "the only legitimate child".

The word is used in Hebrews 11:17-19 (NRSVUE) to describe Isaac, son of Abraham. This is not because Isaac was the only son that Abraham had begotten, but because he was the only son of Abraham recognized by God as the legitimate son of the covenant, and so was the "only legitimate child" of Abraham according to God's promise.

The term is notable outside normal Greek usage in two special areas: in the cosmology of Parmenides and Plato and in the Gospel of John. As concerns the use by Plato there is broad academic consensus, generally following the understanding of the philosopher Proclus (412–485 AD).

Some interpretations of the word "unique" attempt to preclude birth, yet the full Greek meaning is always in the context of a child (genes). A unique child is also a born child, hence the full meaning of the word "begotten", as found in John 3:16 (NRSVUE) and other verses. Thus, we should interpret that the application of this to Jesus' begottenness refers to how Jesus is unique, perhaps in terms of the virgin birth.

== Gnosticism and magic texts ==
Platonic usage also impacted Christian usage, for example in Gnosticism. In Tertullian's Against the Valentinians, he gives the name to one of their thirty aeons as monogenes in a syzygy with makaria, Blessedness.

- Friedrich Preisigke's Sammelbuch (1922) 4324,15 contains a 3rd cent. AD magic invocation by an Egyptian girl called Capitolina placing a papyrus in a box to invoke various gods, pagan, Jewish and Christian, including "Iao Sabaoth Barbare..., God in Heaven, the Only-Begotten" to help her cast a love potion on a young man called Nilos:

"I summon you divinities by the bitter necessities that bind you and by those carried away by the wind IO IOE PHTHOUTH EIO PHRE. The Greatest Divinity YAH SABAOTH BARBARE THIOTH LAILAMPS OSORNOPHRI EMPHERA, to God in the heavens, the only-begotten (ho Monogenes) who shakes the depths, sending out the waves and the wind. Thrust forth the spirits of these divinities wherever the box... "

Similar content is found in:

- Karl Preisendanz Greek Magical Papyri (1973) Vol.1 p124.
- R. Wunsch Antike Fluchtafeln (Ancient Curse Tablets, 1912) 4,36.

The problem with magical inscriptions on papyri, walls or ostraca is firstly, dating the source, and secondly, that magical spells by nature tend to be syncretic. In the example provided above, lovestruck Capitolina summons "all the divinities" to release the spirits of "all who drowned in the Nile, the unmarried dead", et cetera to sway the heart of her young man, and, yet she may not have known enough about Judaism or Christianity, or even Gnostic Christianity, to know whether "YAH SABAOTH" (Ιαω σαβαωθ, Iaō sabaōth) and "the Only-Begotten" were the same god or not.

== Interpretation of New Testament usage ==
Some aspects of the meaning and/or the semantic range of monogenēs in the New Testament are disputed. Lexicons of the New Testament both reflect and determine debate:

- Bauer BDAG
- Kittel TDNT
- Balz EDNT
- Friberg ALGNT

=== Begetting ===
The entrance of "only begotten" into the English Bible was not directly from mono-genes, but from the Latin of the Vulgate, which reads uni-genitus (one-begotten):

- John 3:16 sic enim dilexit Deus mundum ut Filium suum unigenitum daret ut omnis qui credit in eum non pereat sed habeat vitam aeternam. (Latin Vulgate)
- John 3:16 God lufede middan-eard swa þæt he sealde hys akennedan sune þæt nan ne for-wurðe þe on hine ge-lefð. Ac habbe þt eche lyf. (Hatton Gospels c.1160 AD)
- John 3:16 For God lovede so the world, that he yaf his oon bigetun sone, that each man that bileveth in him perishe not, but have everlastynge lijf.(Wycliffe's Bible 1395 AD)

The meaning of monogenēs was part of early Christian christological controversy regarding the Trinity. It is claimed that Arian arguments that used texts that refer to Christ as God's "only begotten Son" are based on a misunderstanding of the Greek word monogenēs, and that the Greek word does not mean "begotten" in the same sense as begetting children, but instead means "having no peer, unique".

Alternatively, in favour of the interpretation that the word monogenēs does carry some meaning related to begetting, is the etymological origin mono- (only) + -genes (born, begotten).

The question is whether the etymological origin was still "live" as part of the meaning when the New Testament was written, or whether semantic shift has occurred. Limiting the semantic change of monogenes is that the normal word monos is still the default word in New Testament times, and that the terms co-exist in Greek, Latin and English:

Greek monos → Latin unicus → English only
Greek mono-genes → Latin uni-genitus → English only-begotten

There is also the question of how separate birth and beggeting, the cited uses of monogenēs in the sense of "unique", truly are from the idea of genēs. For example, the ending -genes is arguably not redundant, even in the sense of "only", just as when Clement of Rome (96 AD), and later Origen, Cyril and others, employ monogenes to describe the rebirth of the phoenix.

At issue is whether Clement is merely stressing monos unique, or using monogenes to indicate unique in its method of rebirth, or possibly that there is only one single bird born and reborn. Likewise in Plato's Timaeus, the "only-begotten and created Heaven", is still unique in how it is begotten, in comparison to the begetting of animals and men, just as Earth and Heaven give birth to Ocean and Tethys. Of the Liddell Scott references for "unique" (monogenes being used purely as monos) that leaves only Parmenides, which (as above) is no longer considered a likely reading of the Greek text.

Additionally the New Testament frame of reference for monogenes is established by uses of the main verb "beget", and readings of complementary verses:

Heb. 1:5 (NRSVUE) "For to which of the angels did God ever say, "You are my Son; today I have begotten you"? Or again, "I will be his Father, and he will be my Son?" (citing Ps. 2:7, Acts 13:33, Heb. 5:5)

1 John 5:18 "We know that those who are born of God do not sin..."

=== Uniqueness ===
This issue overlaps with, and is interrelated with, the question of begetting above. Interpretation of the uniqueness of monogenes in New Testament usage partly depends on understanding of Hellenistic Jewish ideas about inheritance. Philo stated:

- On Abraham 194: "In the second place, after he [Abraham] had become the father of this [Isaac] his loved-and-only (agapetos kai monos) son, he, from the moment of his birth, cherished towards him all the genuine feelings of affection, which exceeds all modest love, and all the ties of friendship which have ever been celebrated in the world."
- On Sacrifice X.(43): "And he [Jacob] learnt all these things from Abraham his grandfather, who was the author of his own education, who gave to the all-wise Isaac all that he had, leaving none of his substance to bastards, or to the spurious reasonings of concubines, but he gives them small gifts, as being inconsiderable persons. For the possessions of which he is possessed, namely, the perfect virtues, belong only to the perfect and legitimate son;"

In his 1894 translation of Philo Charles Duke Yonge rendered "loved-and-only son" (agapetos kai monos uios) as "only legitimate son", which is not unreasonable given Philo's parallel comments in On Sacrifice X.43. It also parallels Josephus' use (see above 20:20) for a legitimate son of the main royal wife.

Likewise in the later Jewish Septuagint revisions:

- Gen 22:2 of Aquila "take your son Isaac, your only-begotten (monogenes) son whom you love"
- Gen 22:12 of Symmachus "now I know that you fear God, seeing you have not withheld your son, your only-begotten (monogenes) son, from me.”

In contrast in Proverbs 4:3 Aquila, Symmachus and Theodotion all have monogenes of a mother's only-begotten son where legitimacy is not an issue.

=== Textual issues in John 1:18 ===
In textual criticism, opinions are divided on whether Jesus is referred to as "only-begotten God" or "only-begotten Son", in John 1:18. According to the majority of modern scholars the external evidence favors monogenês theos as the original text. This reading exists primarily in the Alexandrian text-types. Textus Receptus, the manuscript tradition behind the KJV and many other Bibles, reads ho monogenês huios. This reading ranks second in terms of the number of manuscripts containing it, and has a wider distribution among text-types.

- monogenes theos P75, P66, Vaticanus, Sinaiticus etc.
- o monogenes uios Alexandrinus, Textus Receptus, Peshitta etc.

This textual issue is complicated by the scribal abbreviations of nomina sacra where "G-d" and "S-n" are abbreviated in the Greek manuscripts by ΘΣ and ΥΣ (theta-sigma vs upsilon-sigma) increasing the likelihood of scribal error.
