= N̈ =

Latin letter N with diaeresis

"N̈", or "n̈" (referred to as n-diaeresis or n-umlaut) is a grapheme from several minor extended Latin alphabets, the letter N with a diaeresis mark.

It occurs in the orthographies of Jacaltec (a Mayan language), dialectal Malagasy (infrequently used), Tol language, and Cape Verdean Creole, in all four cases representing a velar [ŋ]. It is also commonly used in the Chibchan languages spoken in Costa Rica, such as the Boruca language, Nawdm language (where it only exists as a lowercase letter), Jersey Dutch, and Ocaina language.

In chemistry, N̈ represents a nitrene.

== Encoding ==
"N̈" and "n̈" appear in very few languages, so they are not represented on any computer keyboard in any language.

Neither "N̈" nor "n̈" have precomposed forms in the Unicode character set, meaning their only representation is as a combining sequence of a letter "N" (or "n") followed by a combining diaeresis U+0308.

"N̈" and "n̈" are not available as HTML entities.

== In popular culture ==
The letter is probably best known for its use in the name of the fictional band Spın̈al Tap. Its use there parodies the metal umlaut used gratuitously by several actual bands, such as Blue Öyster Cult, Motörhead, and Mötley Crüe. According to fictional musician David St. Hubbins, "it's like a pair of eyes; you're looking at the umlaut, and it's looking at you".

The video game Borderlands 2 contains a boss named Captain̈ Flyn̈t.

American children's animated series Hanazuki: Full of Treasures logo stylized using umlauts as Han̈azüki.

== See also ==
- Ñ
