= Etruscan alphabet =

Alphabet used by the Etruscans of central and northern Italy

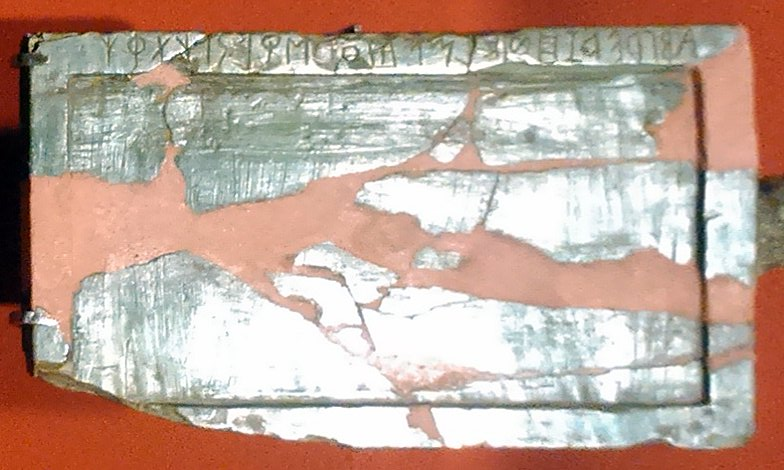
The Marsiliana Tablet: a wax tablet with an early form of the Etruscan alphabet on the frame

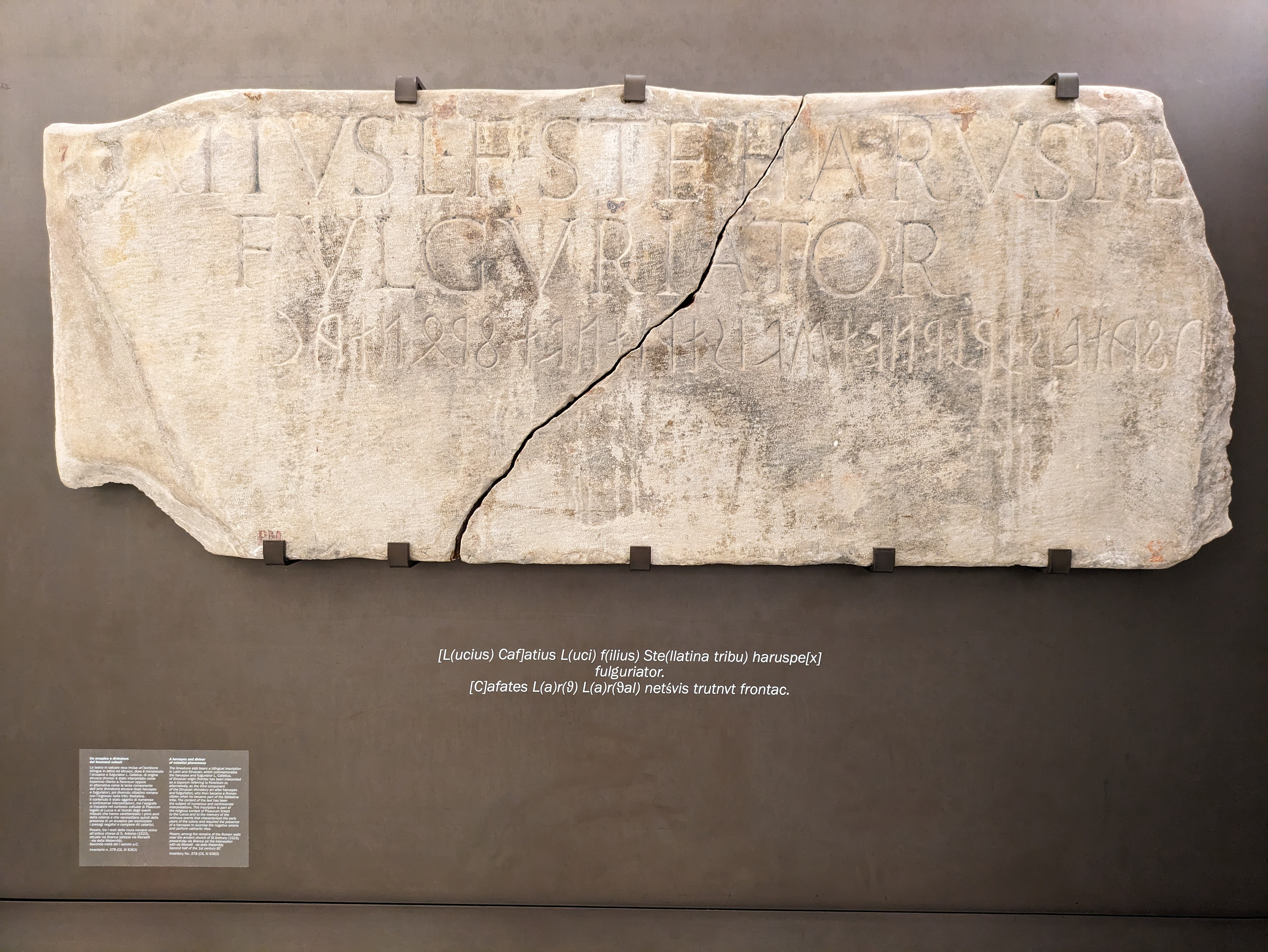
Bilingual Latin - Etruscan inscription, second half of the 1st century BC

The Etruscan alphabet was used by the Etruscans, an ancient civilization of central and northern Italy, to write their language, from about 700 BC to sometime around 100 AD.

The Etruscan alphabet derives from the Euboean alphabet used in the Greek colonies in southern Italy which belonged to the "western" ("red") type, the so-called Western Greek alphabet. Several Old Italic scripts, including the Latin alphabet, derived from it (or simultaneously with it).

== Origins ==
The Etruscan alphabet originated as an adaptation of the Euboean alphabet used by the Euboean Greeks in their first colonies in Italy, the island of Pithekoussai and the city of Cumae in Campania. In the alphabets of the West, X had the sound value [ks], Ψ stood for [kʰ]; in Etruscan: X = [s], Ψ = [kʰ] or [kχ] (Rix 202–209).

The earliest known Etruscan abecedarium is inscribed on the frame of a wax tablet in ivory, measuring 8.8 cm × 5 cm (3.5 in × 2 in), found at Marsiliana (near Grosseto, Tuscany). It dates from about 700 BC, and lists 26 letters corresponding to contemporary forms of the Greek alphabet, including digamma, san, and qoppa, but not omega, which had still not been added at the time.

== Letters ==
Phoenician model	ʾĀlep	Bēt	Gīml	Dālet	He	Wāw	Zayin	Ḥēt	Ṭēt	Yod	Kāp	Lāmed	Mēm	Nūn	Śāmek	ʿAyin	Pē	Ṣādē	Qōp	Reš	Šīn	Tāw					
Western Greek																											
Sound in Ancient Greek (Western)	[a]	[b]	[ɡ]	[d]	[e]	[w]	[dz]~[z]~[zd]	[h]	[tʰ]	[i]	[k]	[l]	[m]	[n]		[o]	[p]	[ts]~[s]	[k]	[r]	[s]	[t]	[u]	[ks]	[pʰ]	[kʰ]	
Old Italic (Unicode block)	𐌀	𐌁	𐌂	𐌃	𐌄	𐌅	𐌆	𐌇	𐌈	𐌉	𐌊	𐌋	𐌌	𐌍	𐌎	𐌏	𐌐	𐌑	𐌒	𐌓 𐌛	𐌔	𐌕	𐌖	𐌗	𐌘	𐌙	𐌚
Marsiliana tablet																											
Archaic Etruscan (to 5th c.)																											
Neo-Etruscan																											
Transliteration	a	b	c	d	e	v	z	h	θ	i	k	l	m	n	š	o	p	σ	q	r	s, ς	t	u	s̽	φ	χ	f
Approx. pron.	[a]	—	[k]	—	[e]	[w]	[ts]	[h]	[tʰ]	[i]	[k]	[l]	[m]	[n]	—	—	[p]	[ʃ], [s]	[k]	[r]	[s], [ʃ]	[t]	[u]	—	[pʰ]	[kʰ]	[f]

The shapes of the Archaic Etruscan and Neo-Etruscan letters had a few variants, used in different places and/or in different epochs. Notably, opposite letters were used for [s] and [ʃ] depending on the locality. In addition, the circular letters used for [tʰ] and [o] could be confused (see urn inscription below).

Shown above are the glyphs from the Unicode Old Italic block, whose appearance will depend on the font used by the browser. These are oriented as they would be in lines written from left to right. Also shown are SVG images of variants shown as they would be written right to left, as in most of the actual inscriptions.

== Development ==
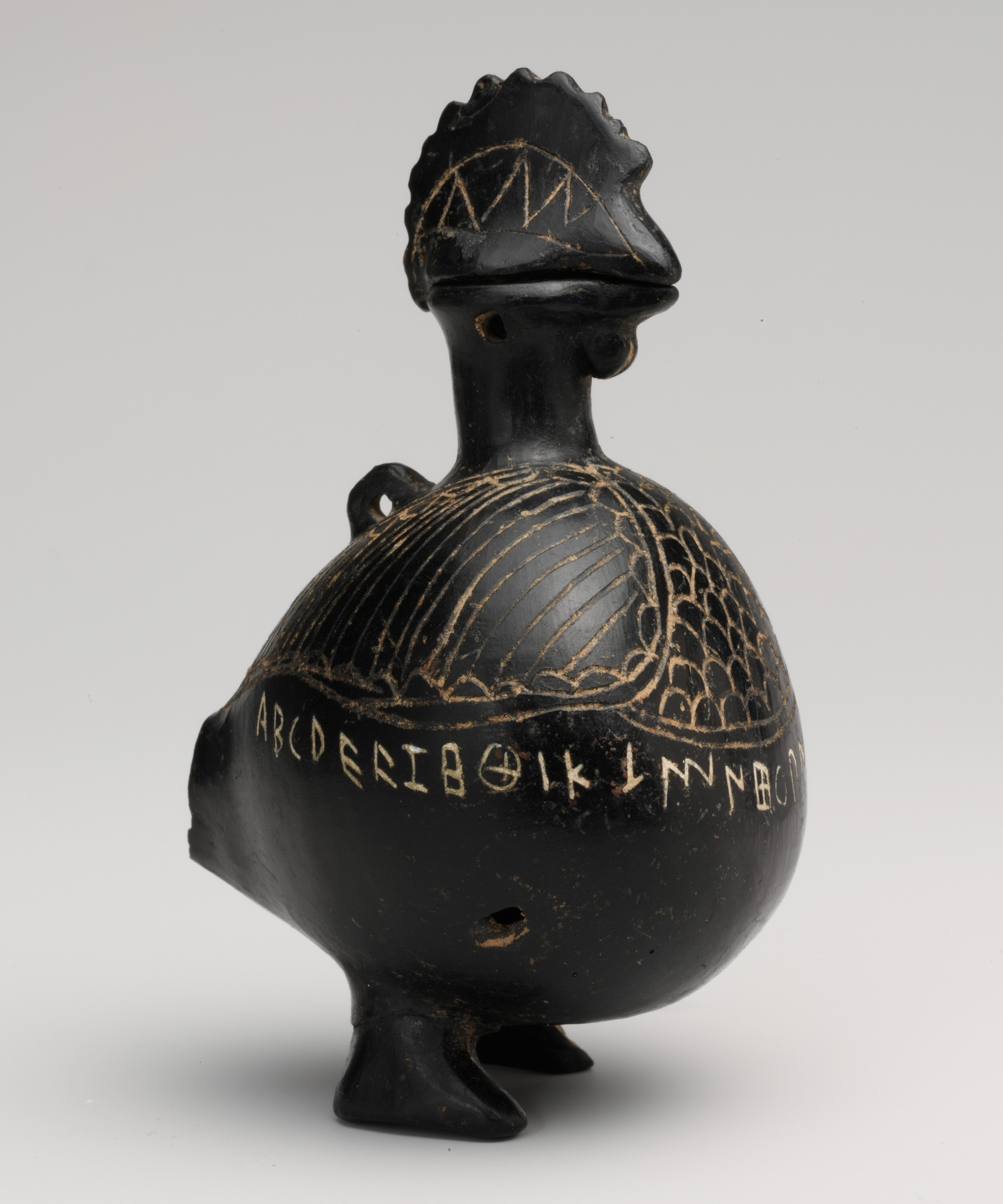
Small Etruscan bottle from 630 to 620 BCE with an early form of the alphabet

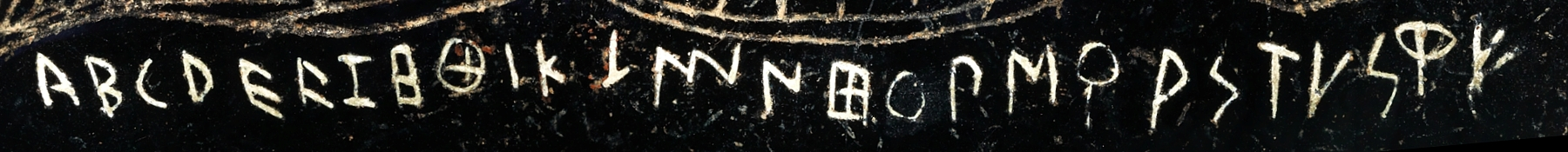
The alphabet on the cockerel bottle

The archaic form of the Etruscan alphabet remained practically unchanged from its origin in the 8th century BC until about 600 BC, and the direction of writing was free. From the 6th century BC, however, the alphabet evolved, adjusting to the phonology of the Etruscan language, and letters representing phonemes nonexistent in Etruscan were dropped. By 400 BC, it appears that all of Etruria was using the classical Etruscan alphabet of 20 letters, mostly written from right to left.

An additional sign 𐌚, in shape similar to the numeral 8, transcribed as F, was present in Lydian, Neo-Etruscan and Italic alphabets of Osco-Umbrian languages such as Oscan, Umbrian, Old Sabine and South Picene (Old Volscian). This sign was introduced in Etruscan around 600–550 BC and was not present in the Marsiliana tablet, the earliest example of the Etruscan alphabet. It is thought that the sign 𐌚 may have been an altered B or H or an ex novo creation. Formerly it was even suspected to have been an Etruscan invention, but an early Sabellian inscription suggests that it is instead an invention of speakers of a Sabellian language (Osco-Umbrian languages). Its sound value was /f/ and it replaced the Etruscan digraph FH that was previously used to express that sound. Some letters were, on the other hand, falling out of use. Etruscan did not have any voiced stops, for which B, C, D were originally intended (/b/, /ɡ/, and /d/ respectively). The B and D therefore fell out of use, and the C, which is simpler and easier to write than K, was adopted to write /k/, mostly displacing K itself. Likewise, since Etruscan had no /o/ vowel sound, O disappeared and was replaced by U. In the course of its simplification, the redundant letters showed some tendency towards a semi-syllabary: C, K and Q were predominantly used in the contexts CE, KA, QU.

This classical alphabet remained in use until the 2nd century BC, when it began to be influenced by the rise of the Latin alphabet. Soon after, the Etruscan language itself became extinct — so thoroughly that its vocabulary and grammar are still only partly known, in spite of more than a century of intense research. The Romans, who did have voiced stops in their language, after taking over the archaic Etruscan alphabet in the 7th century BC, continued to use B and D for /b/ and /d/, and used C for both /k/ and /ɡ/, until they invented a separate letter G to distinguish the two sounds.

== Legacy ==
The Etruscan alphabet apparently was the immediate ancestor for the Latin alphabet, as well as of several Old Italic scripts used in Italy before the rise of Rome, such as those used in the Oscan, Umbrian, Lepontic, Rhaetian (or Raetic), Venetic, Messapian, North and South Picene, and Camunic inscriptions.

== Gallery ==
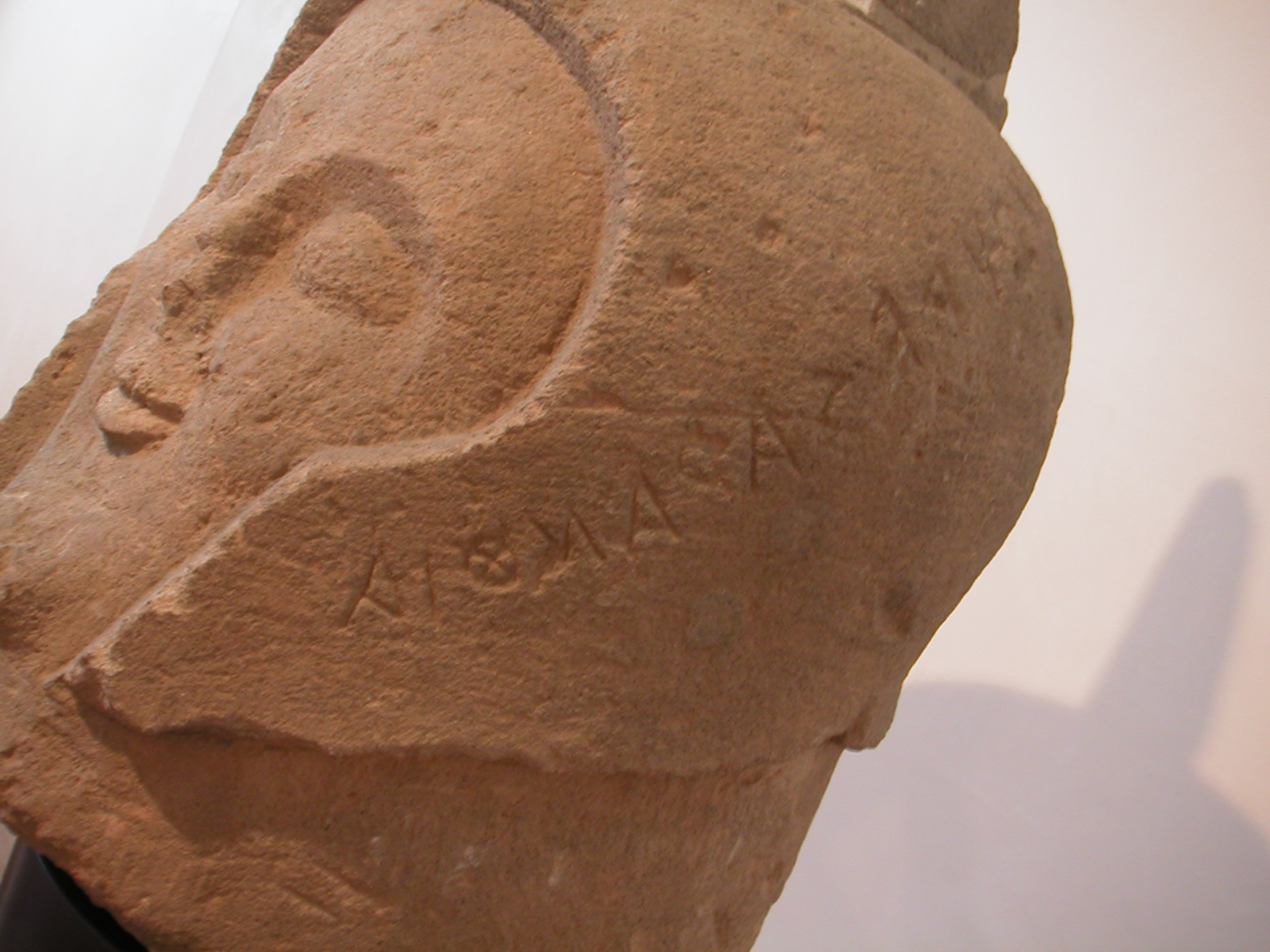
Grave marker from Crocifisso del Tufo with an inscription in the Etruscan alphabet

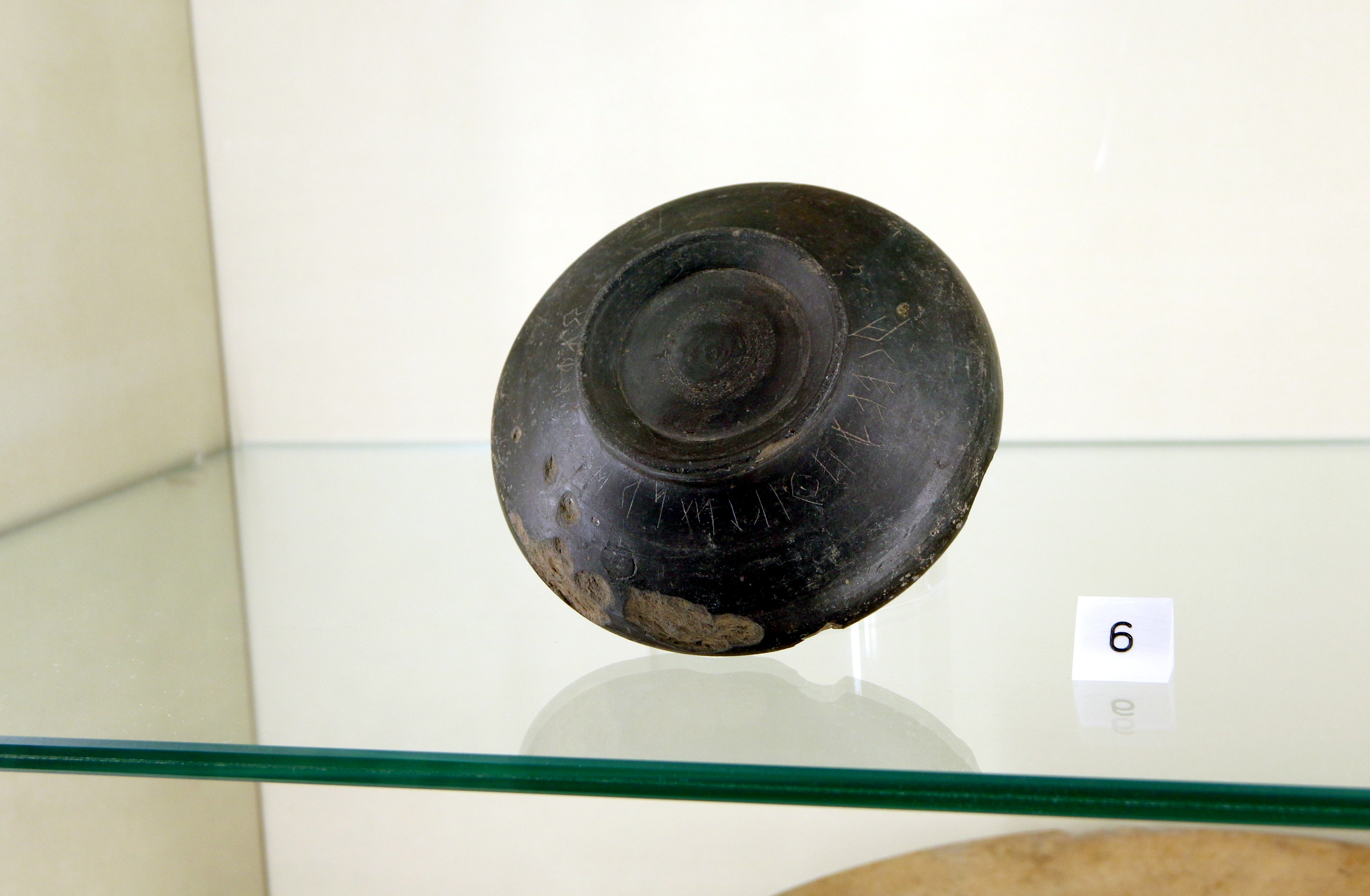
A 6th century BC bowl from Roselle (bucchero dish) with the south variant of Etruscan alphabet

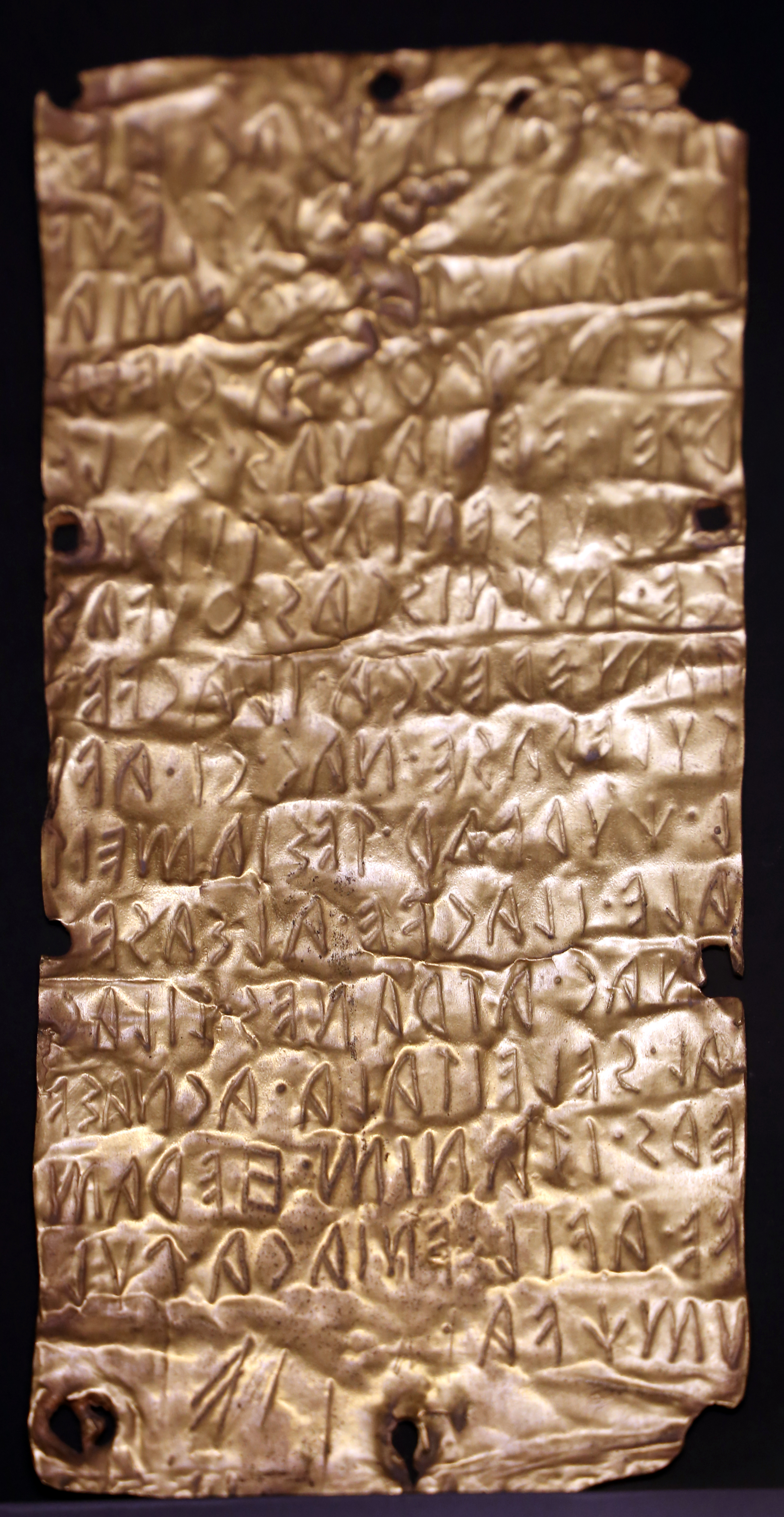
Pyrgi Tablet, c. 510 BC

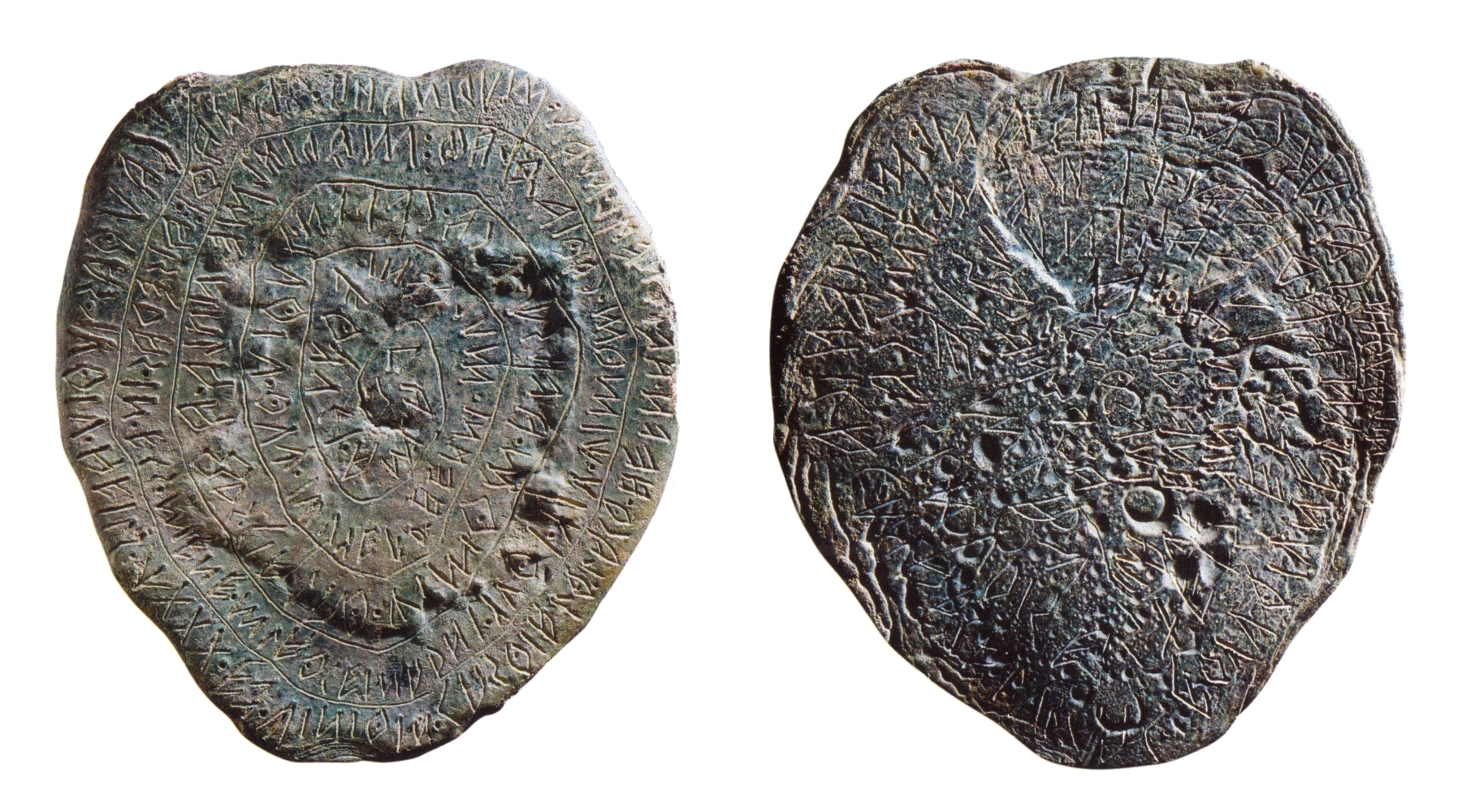
The Lead Plaque of Magliano, 450 BC

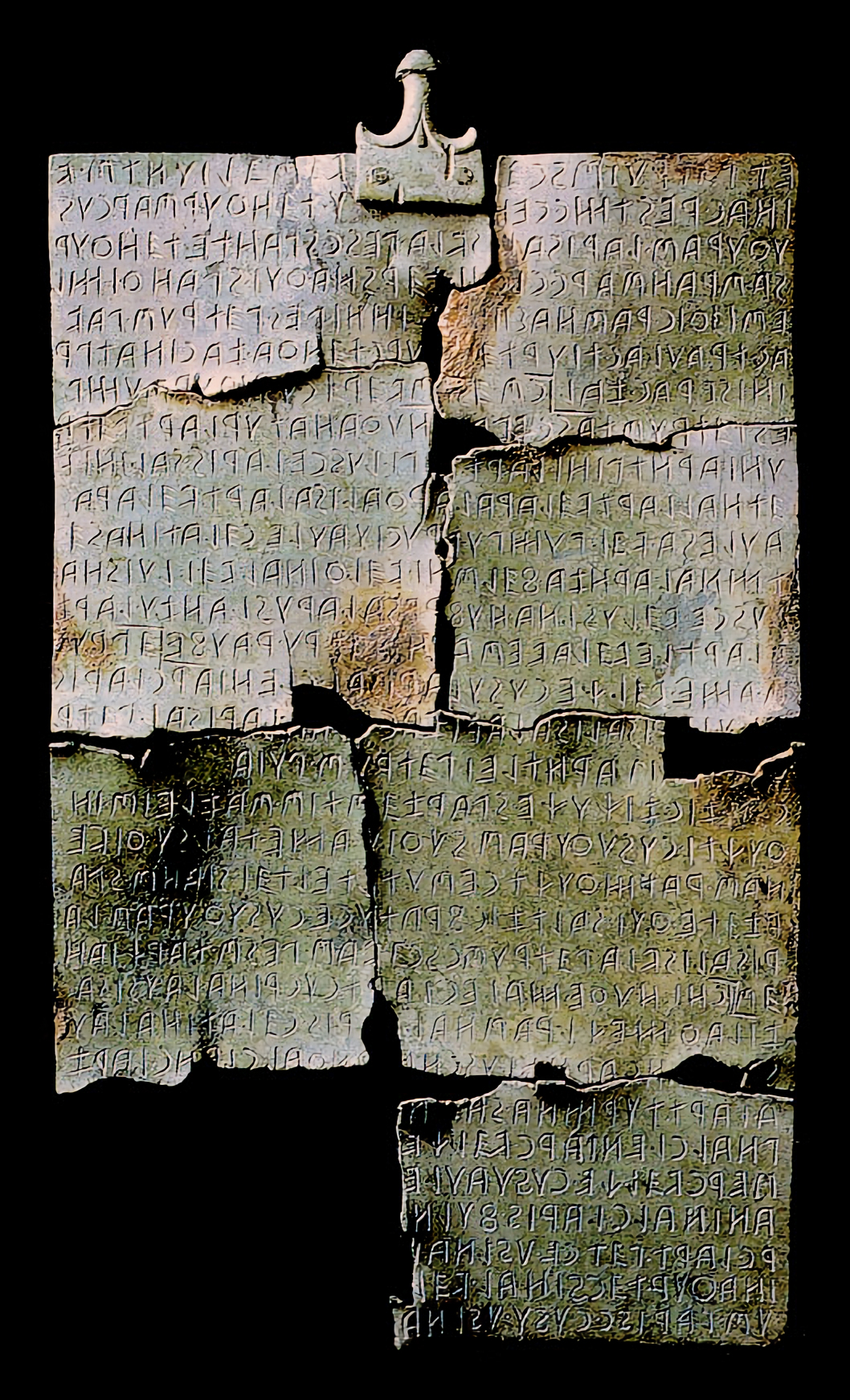
The Tabula Cortonensis, 4th-5th century BCE

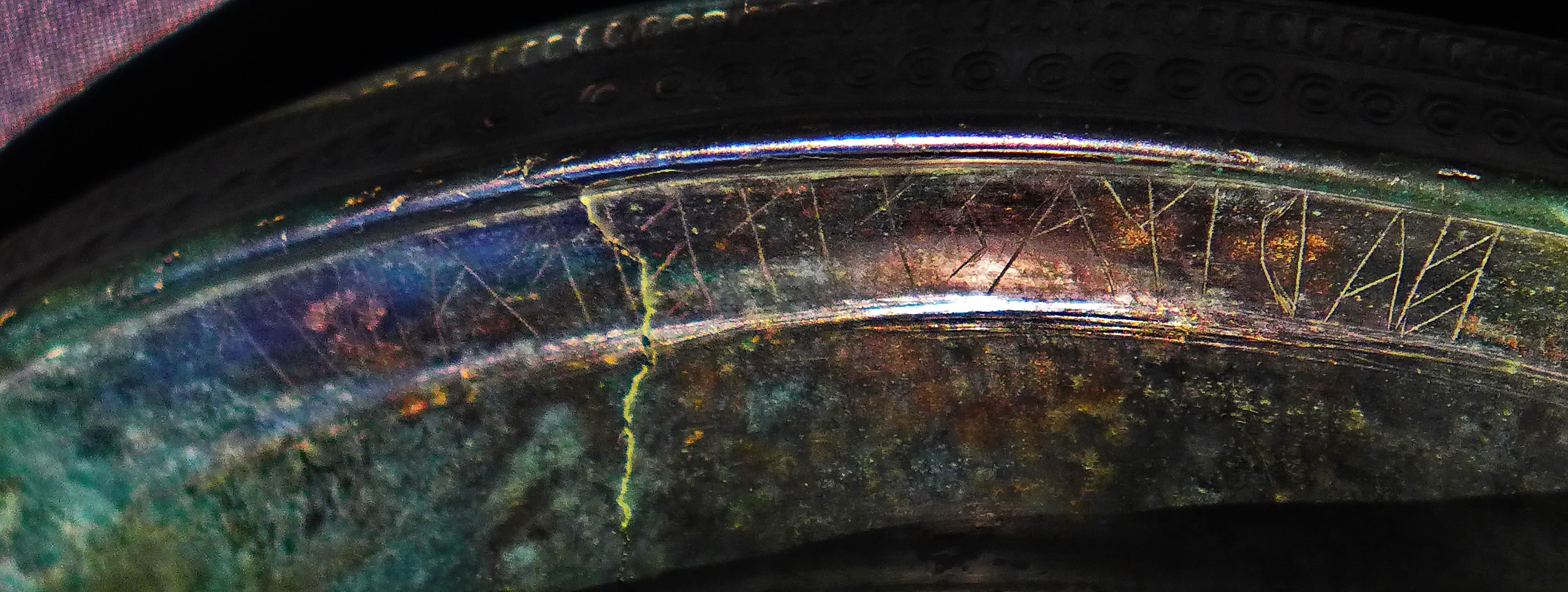
Negau helmet inscription

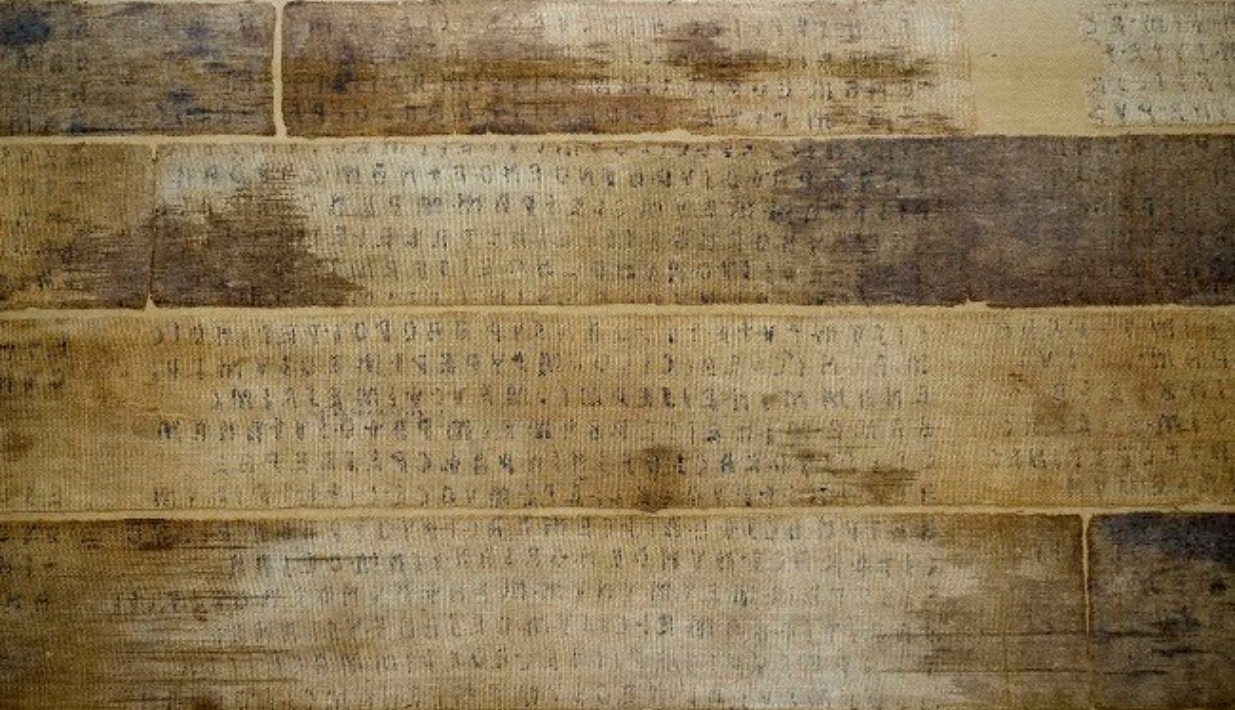
Fragments of the Liber Linteus manuscript, 2nd to 1st century BC

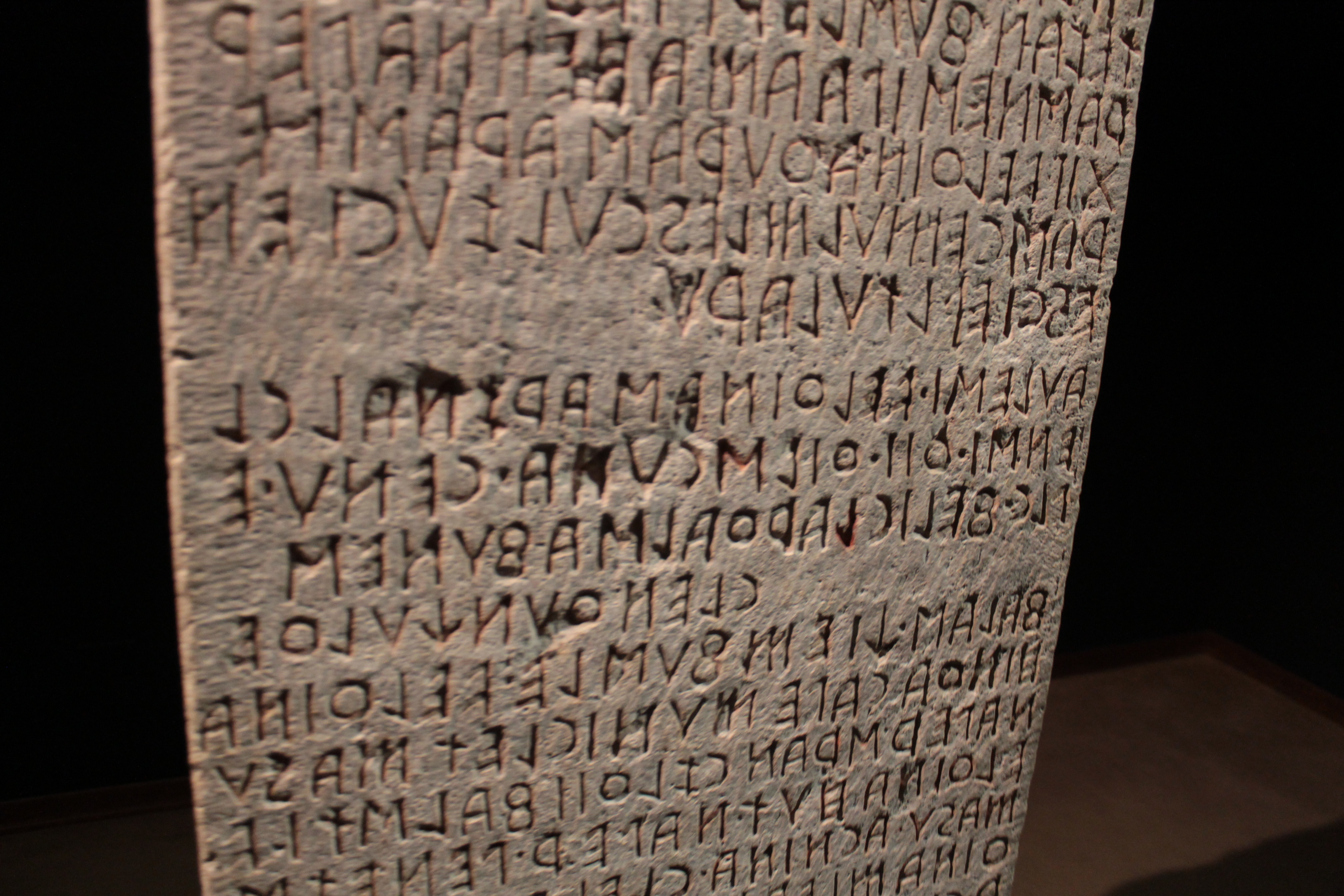
Close-up of the Cippus Perusinus inscription

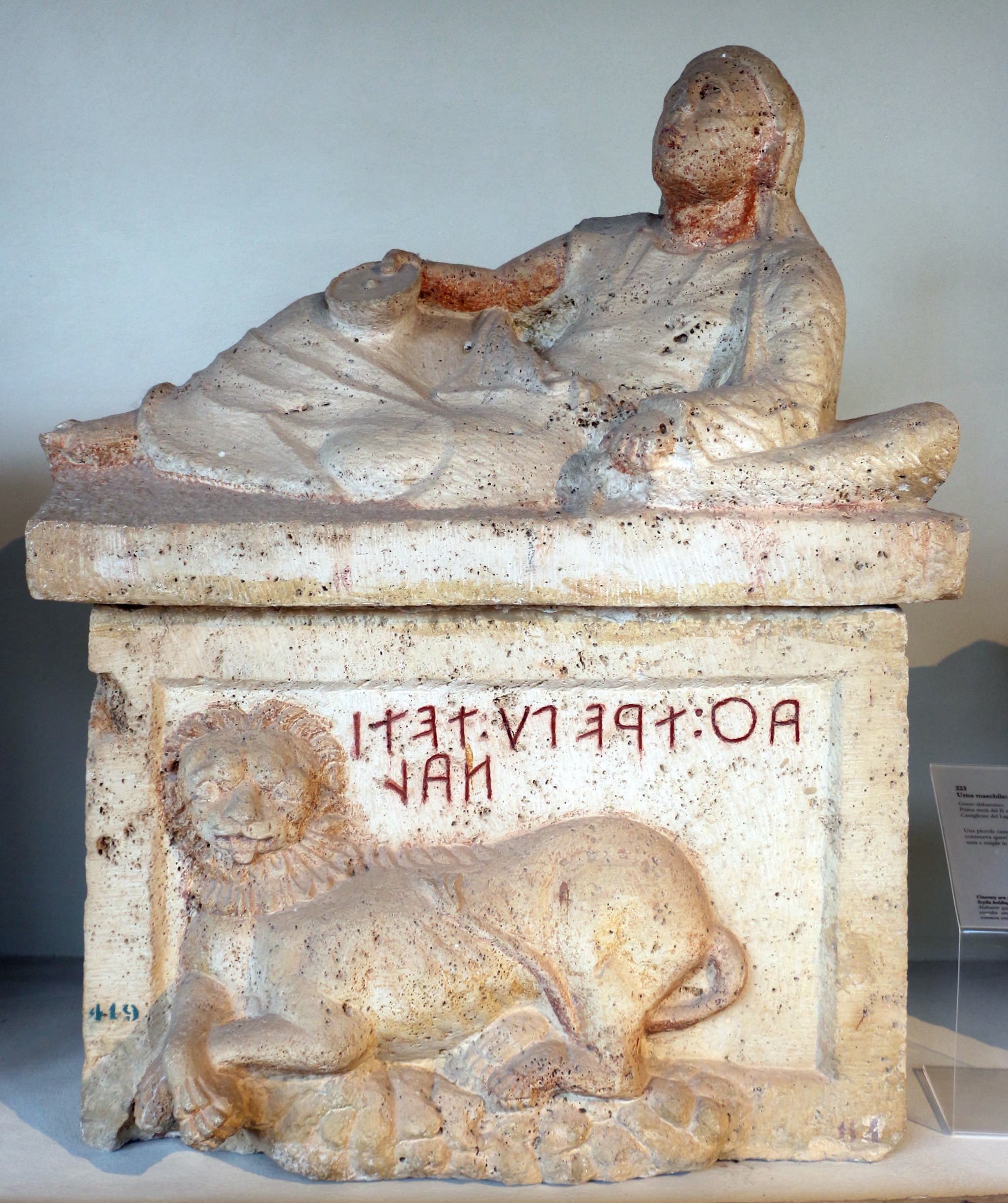
2nd-century-BC funerary urn inscribed in Etruscan

== See also ==
- Etruscan numerals
- Old Italic scripts
- Runes
