= S̈ =

Latin letter S with diaeresis

S̈, s̈ in lower case, also s with diaeresis, is a letter in the Latin alphabet for the Chechen language, where it represents the voiceless postalveolar fricative [ʃ]. It has the same sound as the š used in Slavic languages written with the Latin alphabet, the Turkic/Romanian ş/ș and the common digraph "sh".

In the Chechen language, it was changed from the original ş into s̈, at the same time that ç was changed into c̈.

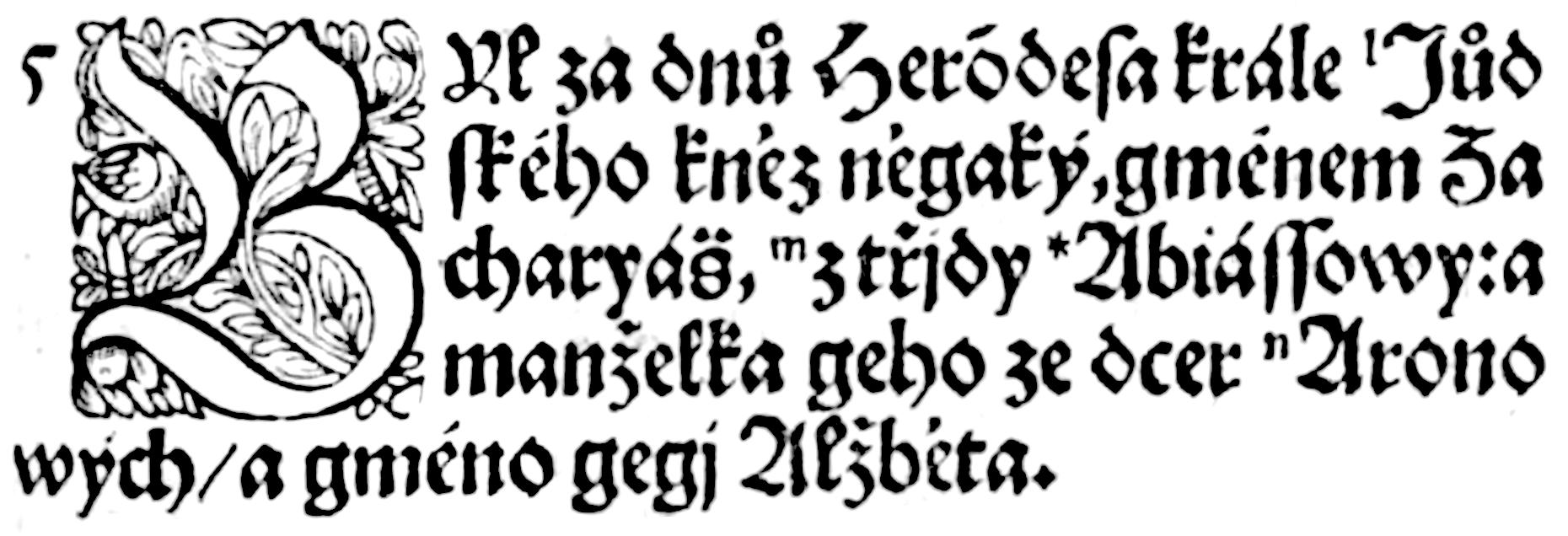
Luke 5:1, Bible of Kralice, with Zacharyás̈ and Abiáſſowy, nowadays written Zacharyáš and Abiášovy in Czech.

In older Czech orthography s̈ was used in codas instead of ſſ for /ʃ/, modern orthography uses š for all instances.

In the Seneca language, s̈ represents /ʃ/.

It is also used in the digraph s̈h in the Shipibo and Chamicuro Languages; s̈h represents /ʂ/, and sh (without the diaeresis) represents /ʃ/.
