= Crocifisso del Tufo =

Etruscan necropolis

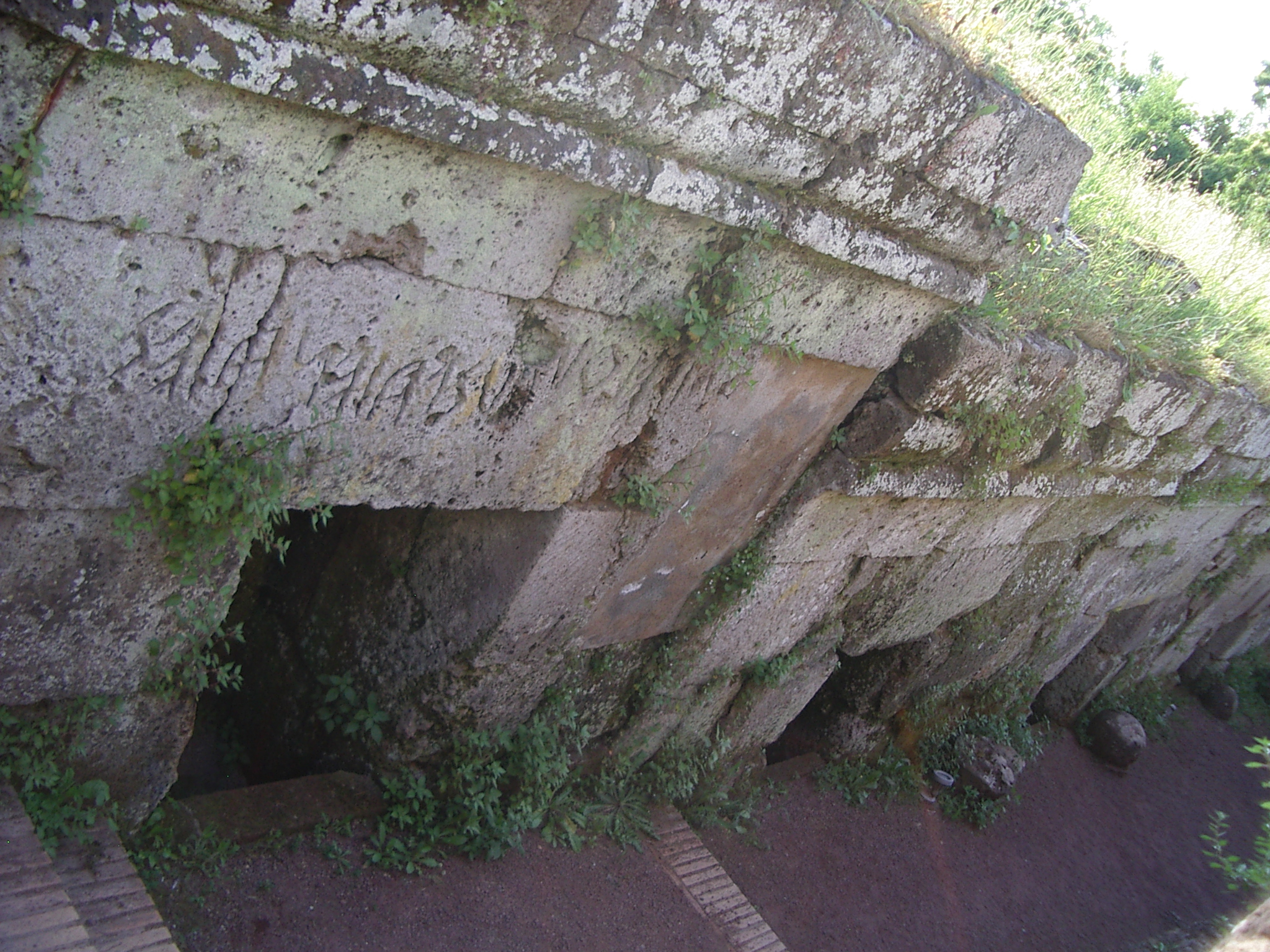
- Example of incision on lintel.
- Interactive map of Crocifisso del Tufo
- 42°43′15.6″N 12°06′9.2″E
- Location: Orvieto, Umbria, Italy

The Crocifisso del Tufo is an Etruscan necropolis in Orvieto, Umbria, Italy.

The necropolis owes its name to a crucifix engraved in the tuff inside a rock chapel, carved into the rock on which the city stands. The small church that gave the name to the necropolis can also be reached via a pedestrian path that descends from Porta Maggiore.

It is dated to at least the 6th century because of inscriptions found at the site. It was attended from the 8th to the 3rd centuries B.C. However, its apex of development was in the 6th and 5th centuries. It is to this time that the layout of the necropolis, grouped in blocks, is dated. It consists of over 200 tombs. The burials were fashioned from the local stone-like amalgam called tuff, a mixture of lava and ash. They are of "chamber" type, mostly arranged in a network of sepulchral streets, forming an orthogonal system.

The lots, "defined by orthogonal intersecting roads that were occupied by tombs of the cubic kind—"a dado" like dice—follow a rigid disposition reflecting a social organization of an egalitarian kind."

The burials that can be visited today belong to individual families; they were closed with a slab of tuff and cushioned with blocks of tuff. Each tomb has the family name in Etruscan inscribed on the entrance lintels.

Riccardo Mancini, an Orvieto native who had been working on Etruscan sites since the 1870s, inherited some property, to which land was possibly added through marriage. In this property, he discovered the Crocifisso del Tufo necropolis. It lay unknown and untouched for over 2000 years.

The objects found at the site can be seen at the Museums of Orvieto. Some of them are luxurious items, showing the wealth achieved by a large part of the population.
