= Old Italic (Unicode block) =

- Range: U+10300..U+1032F (48 code points)
- Plane: SMP
- Scripts: Old Italic
- Major alphabets: Etruscan; Faliscan; Oscan; Umbrian; South Picene
- Assigned: 39 code points
- Unused: 9 reserved code points

Unicode Version History
- 3.1 (2001): 35 (+35)
- 7.0 (2014): 36 (+1)
- 10.0 (2017): 39 (+3)

Unicode documentation
- Code chart ∣ Web page

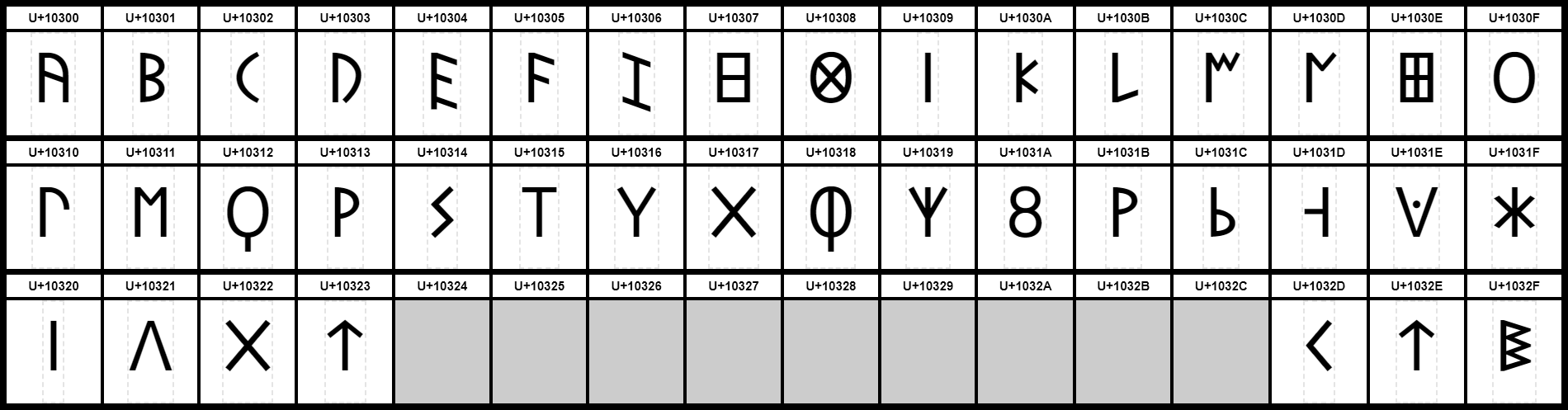
Graphical representation of the Old Italic Unicode block. Hatched boxes indicate non-assigned code points.

Old Italic is a Unicode block containing a unified repertoire of several Old Italic scripts used in various parts of Italy starting about 700 BCE, including the Etruscan alphabet and others that were derived from it (or cognate with it). All such languages had become extinct by around the 1st century BCE with the exception of Latin, where it evolved into the distinctive Latin alphabet that is covered by other Unicode blocks.

== Unification ==
For each script, each code point denotes zero or more symbols that are believed to be equivalent in that script, even if they had very different shapes. For example, in the Archaic Etruscan alphabet (used from the 7th to 5th century BCE) one letter, apparently derived from the Western Ancient Greek letter theta, could be written as a circle with an inscribed "X", or just as a circle. Those two symbols were mapped to the same code point U+10308, "OLD ITALIC LETTER THE" = "𐌈".

Also, two symbols in different scripts were mapped to the same code point if they appeared to have a genetic or phonemic identity, even if their shapes and/or pronunciations were clearly distinct. For example, the Etruscans used a symbol like "C", believed to have evolved from the Ancient Greek letter gamma, for the "k" sound of their language. That symbol was assumed to be the origin of (or cognate with) a symbol of the Oscan alphabet that looked like "<" and had the sound of "g". Those two symbols were therefore mapped to the same code point U+10302, "OLD ITALIC LETTER KE" = "𐌂".

Therefore, the appearance of those code points when displayed or printed—as in the table below—is likely to be incorrect, unless they are rendered with a font specifically designed for the particular language and letter style of the text.

== Block ==
Old Italic^{[1]}^{[2]} Official Unicode Consortium code chart (PDF)
	0	1	2	3	4	5	6	7	8	9	A	B	C	D	E	F
U+1030x	𐌀	𐌁	𐌂	𐌃	𐌄	𐌅	𐌆	𐌇	𐌈	𐌉	𐌊	𐌋	𐌌	𐌍	𐌎	𐌏
U+1031x	𐌐	𐌑	𐌒	𐌓	𐌔	𐌕	𐌖	𐌗	𐌘	𐌙	𐌚	𐌛	𐌜	𐌝	𐌞	𐌟
U+1032x	𐌠	𐌡	𐌢	𐌣										𐌭	𐌮	𐌯
Notes 1.As of Unicode version 18.0 2.Grey areas indicate non-assigned code points

== History ==
The following Unicode-related documents record the purpose and process of defining specific characters in the Old Italic block:

Version	Final code points (Note: Proposed code points and characters names may differ from final code points and names)	Count	L2 ID	WG2 ID	Document
3.1	U+10300..1031E, 10320..10323	35	L2/97-101		Jenkins, John H. (1997-05-21), Proposal to add Etruscan to ISO/IEC 10646
3.1	U+10300..1031E, 10320..10323	35	L2/97-195	N1580	Jenkins, John; Everson, Michael (1997-08-16), Etruscan proposal
3.1	U+10300..1031E, 10320..10323	35	L2/97-288	N1603	Umamaheswaran, V. S. (1997-10-24), "8.24.1", Unconfirmed Meeting Minutes, WG 2 Meeting # 33, Heraklion, Crete, Greece, 20 June – 4 July 1997
3.1	U+10300..1031E, 10320..10323	35	L2/98-286	N1703	Umamaheswaran, V. S.; Ksar, Mike (1998-07-02), "8.20.1", Unconfirmed Meeting Minutes, WG 2 Meeting #34, Redmond, WA, USA; 1998-03-16--20
3.1	U+10300..1031E, 10320..10323	35	L2/00-128		Bunz, Carl-Martin (2000-03-01), Scripts from the Past in Future Versions of Unicode
3.1	U+10300..1031E, 10320..10323	35	L2/00-112		de Judicibus, Dario (2000-03-21), Request of change to the proposal to add Etruscan to Unicode/ISO-IEC 10646
3.1	U+10300..1031E, 10320..10323	35	L2/00-133		Küster, Marc; Dohnicht, Marcus (2000-04-18), Altitalische Sprachen
3.1	U+10300..1031E, 10320..10323	35	L2/00-140		Everson, Michael; Jenkins, John; de Judicibus, Dario (2000-04-21), Old Italic 10300--1032F (draft block description)
3.1	U+10300..1031E, 10320..10323	35	L2/00-246		Anderson, Deborah (2000-08-01), Feedback on Old Italic (L2/00-140)
3.1	U+10300..1031E, 10320..10323	35	L2/00-247		Anderson, Deborah (2000-08-02), Addendum to Old Italic feedback in L2/00-246Old Italic feedback: Addendum (on Umbrian and Etruscan glyphs)
3.1	U+10300..1031E, 10320..10323	35	L2/00-115R2		Moore, Lisa (2000-08-08), "Motion 83-M6", Minutes Of UTC Meeting #83
3.1	U+10300..1031E, 10320..10323	35	L2/00-309		Everson, Michael (2000-09-10), Revised glyphs for Old Italic (Irish comments to FCD 10646-2:2000)
3.1	U+10300..1031E, 10320..10323	35	L2/01-050	N2253	Umamaheswaran, V. S. (2001-01-21), "8.1 (Comments from Germany section, Etruscan item)", Minutes of the SC2/WG2 meeting in Athens, September 2000
7.0	U+1031F	1	L2/11-116		Moore, Lisa (2011-05-17), "C.26", UTC #127 / L2 #224 Minutes
7.0	U+1031F	1	L2/11-146R	N4046	Little, Christopher C. (2011-05-17), Proposal to Encode Additional Old Italic Characters
7.0	U+1031F	1		N4103	"11.13 Additions to Old Italic script", Unconfirmed minutes of WG 2 meeting 58, 2012-01-03
7.0	U+1031F	1	L2/12-386	N4395	Little, Christopher C. (2012-11-06), Revised Proposal to Encode Additional Old Italic Characters
10.0	U+1032D..1032F	3		N4403 (pdf, doc)	Umamaheswaran, V. S. (2014-01-28), "Resolution M61.12", Unconfirmed minutes of WG 2 meeting 61, Holiday Inn, Vilnius, Lithuania; 2013-06-10/14
10.0	U+1032D..1032F	3	L2/15-181R	N4669R	Everson, Michael (2015-07-28), Proposal for the addition of three Old Italic characters
10.0	U+1032D..1032F	3	L2/15-187		Moore, Lisa (2015-08-11), "C.4", UTC #144 Minutes
10.0	U+1032D..1032F	3	L2/15-262		Disposition of Comments on ISO/IEC CD 10646 (Ed.5), 2015-10-26
10.0	U+1032D..1032F	3		N4739	"M64.05b", Unconfirmed minutes of WG 2 meeting 64, 2016-08-31
