= Hatton Gospels =

Ancient manuscript

Hatton Gospels is the name now given to a manuscript produced in the late 12th century or early 13th century. It contains a translation of the four gospels into the West Saxon dialect of Old English. It is a nearly complete gospel book, missing only a small part of the Gospel of Luke. It is now in the Bodleian Library, Oxford, as MS Hatton 38. The fullest description of the manuscript is by Takako Kato, in Treharne, et al., eds., Production and Use of English Manuscripts, 1020-1220.

== Illuminations ==
The manuscript has decorated initials. They are large, and appear alternately in red or blue with pen ornament of the other color. The large initials are twenty percent into the margins. The text is indented around the large initials. At the beginning of each gospel, the large initial is green.

== History ==
=== Origin ===
The manuscript was probably produced at Canterbury. It contains paleographic evidence of such an origin. The scribes worked from another manuscript (which is extant) that is itself a copy of a manuscript that in turn is a translation of the Vulgate, the Latin Bible that was the standard Biblical text of Western Christianity.

The manuscript was produced contemporaneously by three scribes. All text is by one hand except for three folios: folio 119 recto which supplies Matthew 25:24 and marginal text on folios 13 verso and 70 verso.

=== Provenance ===
The provenance of the manuscript for its first 400 years is unknown. The first sure knowledge of provenance is the signature of John Parker (d. 1618), on the verso of folio i. Parker was the son of Archbishop Matthew Parker. Next there is a signature of Christopher Hatton, 1st Baron Hatton (d. 1670), on the recto of folio ii. This manuscript was purchased by the Bodleian Library in 1671 from Robert Scot, a London bookseller who had bought part of the library of Baron Hatton shortly after he died.

== Missing text ==
The manuscript is missing Luke 16:12 through 17:1. Folio 62 is a replacement for the missing text, and shows clear evidence of being supplied by Parker, who perhaps paid a scribe to produce it.

== Facsimile ==
1. Anglo-Saxon Manuscripts in Microfiche Facsimile, ed. by R. M. Liuzza and A. N. Doane (Binghamton, NY: Arizona Center for Medieval and Renaissance Studies, 1995), vol. 3: Anglo-Saxon Gospels
2. Roberts, Jane, Guide to Scripts Used in English Writings up to 1500 (London: British Library, 2005), photo reproduction of fol. 80r (Colour pl. C4 and Plate 29)

== Bibliography ==
- Craster, Herbert; Madan, Falconer (1922). A summary catalogue of Western manuscripts in the Bodleian Library at Oxford, which have not hitherto been catalogued in the quarto series: with references to the Oriental and other manuscripts. Part 1. Vol. 2 (First ed.). Oxford: Clarendon Press..
- Grunberg, M., The West-Saxon Gospels: A study of the Gospels of St. Matthew with Text of the Four Gospels (Amsterdam: Scheltema and Holkema NV, 1967)
- Hardwick, Charles ed., Gospels According to Saint Matthew in Anglo-Saxon and Northumbrian Versions, Synoptically Arranged, with Collations of the Best Manuscripts (Cambridge: Cambridge University Press, 1858)
- Junius, Francis and Marshall, Thomas ed., Quatuor D. N. Jesu Christi Evangeliorumversiones perantiquae duae, Gothica scil. et Anglo-Saxonica: Quarum illam ex celeberrimo Codice Argenteo nunc primum depromsit Franciscus Junius F. F. Hanc autem ex Codicibus MSS. collatis emendatius recudi curavit Thomas Mareschallus, Anglus: cujus etiam Observationes in utramque Versionem subnectuntur. Accessit + Glossarium Gothicum cui praemittitur Alphabetum Gothicum, Runicum +c. opera ejusdem francisci Junii., 2 vols (Dordrecht: Henricus and Essaeus, 1665)
- Lenker, Ursula, Die Westsächsische Evangelienversion und die Perikopenordnungen im angelsächsischen England, Münchener Universitäts-Schriften, Philosophische Fakultät, Texte und Untersuchungen zur Englischen Philologie, 20 (Munich: Wilhelm Fink Verlag, 1997)
- Liuzza, R. M., '378. Oxford, Bodleian Library, MS. Hatton 38 (4090): "West Saxon Gospels"', in Anglo-Saxon Manuscripts in Microfiche Facsimile, ed. by R. M. Liuzza and A. N. Doane (Binghamton, NY: Arizona Center for Medieval and Renaissance Studies, 1995), vol. 3: Anglo-Saxon Gospels, pp. 32 – 33
- Skeat, Walter W., ed., The Gospel According to Saint John: in Anglo-Saxon and Northumbrian Versions, Synoptically Arranged, with Collations Exhibiting all the Readings of All the MSS (Cambridge: Cambridge University Press, 1878)
- Madan, Falconer (1895–1953). A Summary Catalogue of Western Manuscripts in the Bodleian Library at Oxford. Oxford: Clarendon Press. p. 837.
