= C̈ =

Latin letter C with diaeresis

C̈, c̈ in lower case is the latin character C with diaeresis.

It has been used in the digraph c̈h for writing the Yanesha and Chamicuro; c̈h represents /t͡ʂ/, and ch (without the diaeresis) represents /t͡ʃ/.

It is sometimes used as a letter in the Chechen language. It represents the voiceless postalveolar affricate /t͡ʃ/, like the English pronunciation of ch in the word chocolate similar to ç.
