= Old Italic scripts =

Family of writing systems in ancient Italy

Old Italic
- The abecedarium inscribed on the Marsiliana tablet, around 700 BC
- Script type: Alphabet
- Period: 7th century – 1st century BC
- Direction: Right-to-left script, left-to-right, boustrophedon

Related scripts
- Parent systems: Egyptian hieroglyphs: Proto-Sinaitic; Phoenician; Greek (Euboean variant); Old Italic
- Child systems: Runic, Latin alphabet

ISO 15924
- ISO 15924: Ital (210), Old Italic (Etruscan, Oscan, etc.)

Unicode
- Unicode alias: Old Italic
- Unicode range: U+10300–U+1032F

The Old Italic scripts are a family of ancient writing systems used in the Italian Peninsula between about 700 and 100 BC, for various languages spoken in that time and place. The most notable member is the Etruscan alphabet, which was the immediate ancestor of the Latin alphabet used by more than 100 languages today, including English. The runic alphabets used in Northern Europe are believed to have been separately derived from one of these alphabets by the 2nd century AD.

== Origins ==
The Old Italic alphabets ultimately derive from the Phoenician alphabet, but the general consensus is that the Etruscan alphabet was imported from the Euboean Greek colonies of Cumae and Ischia (Pithekoūsai) situated in the Gulf of Naples in the 8th century BC; this Euboean alphabet is also called 'Cumaean' (after Cumae), or 'Chalcidian' (after its metropolis Chalcis). The Cumaean hypothesis is supported by the 1957–58 excavations of Veii by the British School at Rome, which found pieces of Greek pottery indicating that contacts between the Etruscan city of Veii and the Greek colonies of Cumae and Ischia had existed ever since the second half of the 8th century. Other scholars posit a different hypothetical Western Greek alphabet that was even older than those attested to have given rise to the Etruscan letters. Whatever the case, the Etruscans added the letters <c>, <q>, and the combination <vh> or <hv> (for /f/) in order to spell sounds that did not exist in Ancient Greek. The development and usage of their own Greek-derived alphabet arguably marked the end of the Villanovan culture and ushered in the Etruscan Orientalising period.

As the Etruscans were the leading civilization of Italy in that period, it is widely accepted that they spread their alphabet across the peninsula, and the other Old Italic scripts were derived from theirs. Scholars provide three reasons: Etruscans and non-Etruscans had strong contacts in the 8th and 7th centuries, surviving inscriptions from other languages appear later (after the end of the 8th century) than the earliest Etruscan ones (first amongst the Umbrians, Faliscans, Latins, and Sabines to the south, in the 6th century also in the Po Valley and amongst the Cisalpine Celtic, Venetic and Raetic tribes), and the letters used in these texts are evidently based on the Etruscan version of the Western Greek alphabet. However, some of them, including the Latin alphabet, retained certain Greek letters that the Etruscans themselves dropped at a rather early stage.

The Old Italic alphabets were used for various languages, which included some Indo-European ones (predominantly from the Italic branch, but also in Gaulish and probably in inscriptions interpreted as Proto-Germanic) and some non-Indo-European ones (such as Etruscan itself).

== Alphabets related to Etruscan ==
The following table shows the ancient Italic scripts that are presumed to be related to the Etruscan alphabet. Symbols that are assumed to correspond are placed in the same column. Many symbols occur with two or more variant forms in the same script; only one variant is shown here. The notations [←] and [→] indicate that the shapes shown were used when writing right-to-left and left-to-right, respectively.

For the languages marked [?] the appearance of the "Letters" in the table is whatever one's browser's Unicode font shows for the corresponding code points in the Old Italic Unicode block. The same code point represents different symbol shapes in different languages; therefore, to display those glyph images properly one needs to use a Unicode font specific to that language.

Phoenician
Letter [?][←]	𐤀	𐤁	𐤂	𐤃	𐤄	𐤅	𐤆	𐤇	𐤈	𐤉	𐤊	𐤋	𐤌	𐤍	𐤎	𐤏	𐤐	𐤑	𐤒	𐤓	𐤔	𐤕								
Value	ʾ	b	g	d	h	w	z	ḥ	ṭ	y	k	l	m	n	s	ʿ	p	ṣ	q	r	š	t								
Western Greek
Letter [→]																														
Value	a	b	g	d	e	w	zd	h	tʰ	i	k	l	m	n		o	p	s	k	r	s	t	u	ks	pʰ	kʰ				
Transcription	Α	Β	Γ	Δ	Ε	Ϝ	Ζ	Η	Θ	Ι	Κ	Λ	Μ	Ν	Ξ	Ο	Π	Ϻ	Ϙ	Ρ	Σ	Τ	Υ	X	Φ	Ψ				
Etruscan – from 7th century BC
Marsiliana [←]																														
Archaic (to 5th c.) [←]																														
Neo (4th to 1st c.)[←]																														
Value	a		k		e	w	ts	h	tʰ	i	k	l	m	n			p	ʃ	k	r	s	t	u	s	pʰ	kʰ	f			
Transcription	a		c		e	v	z	h	θ	i	k	l	m	n			p	ś	q	r	s	t	u	ṡ	φ	χ	f			
Oscan – from 5th century BC
Letter [←]																														
Value	a	b	g	d	ɛ (Note: Zair (2016) uses /ɛ/ for ⟨e⟩ and /e/ for ⟨í⟩ as phonemic symbols.)	w	ts	h		i	k	l	m	n			p			r	s	t	u				f	o	e (Note: Buck (1904), p. 22: «The í is used to indicate an open i-sound, representing etymologically a short i, an ē, a short e in hiatus and occurring regularly in i-diphthongs and in the combination ií representing ī».)	
Transcription	a	b	g	d	e	v	z	h		i	k	l	m	n			p			r	s	t	u				f	ú	í	
Lepontic – 7th to 5th century BC
Letter [?][→]	𐌀				𐌄	𐌅	𐌆		𐌈	𐌉	𐌊	𐌋	𐌌	𐌍		𐌏	𐌐	𐌑		𐌓	𐌔	𐌕	𐌖	𐌗						
Value
Transcription	A				E	V	Z		Θ	I	K	L	M	N		O	P	Ś		R	S	T	U	X						
South Picene – from 6th century BC
Letter [?][→]	𐌀	𐌁	𐌂	𐌃	𐌄	𐌅		𐌇		𐌉	𐌊	𐌋	𐌌	𐌍		𐌏	𐌐		𐌒	𐌓	𐌔	𐌕	𐌖				𐌚	𐌞	𐌝	𐌟
Value
Transcription	A	B	G	D	E	V		H		I	K	L	M	N		O	P		Q	R	S	T	U				F	Ú	Í	*

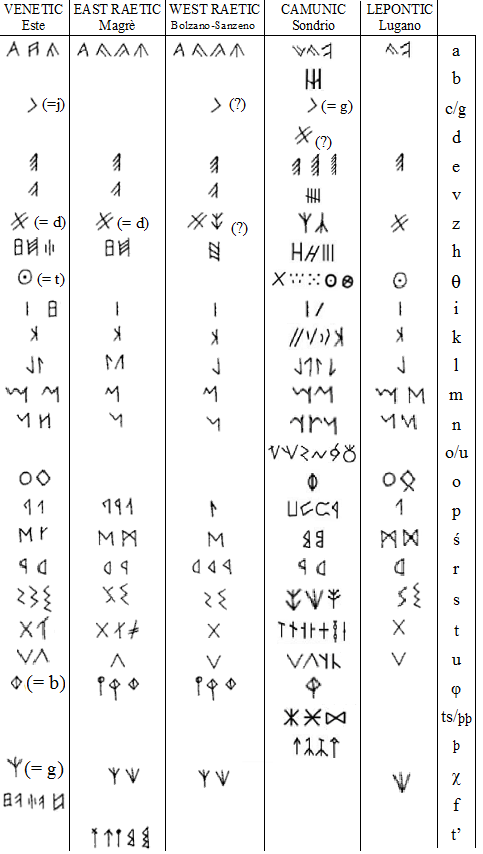
The alphabets of Este (Venetic), Magrè and Bolzano/Bozen-Sanzeno (Raetic), Sondrio (Camunic), Lugano (Lepontic)

Missing from the above table:

- Venetic
- Faliscan
- Umbrian
- North Picene
- Rhaetic (Raetic)
- Camunic

=== Etruscan alphabet ===
Various Indo-European languages belonging to the Italic branch (Faliscan and members of the Sabellian group, including Oscan, Umbrian, and South Picene, and other Indo-European branches such as Venetic) originally used the alphabet. Faliscan, Oscan, Umbrian, North Picene, and South Picene all derive from an Etruscan form of the alphabet.

=== Nucerian alphabet ===
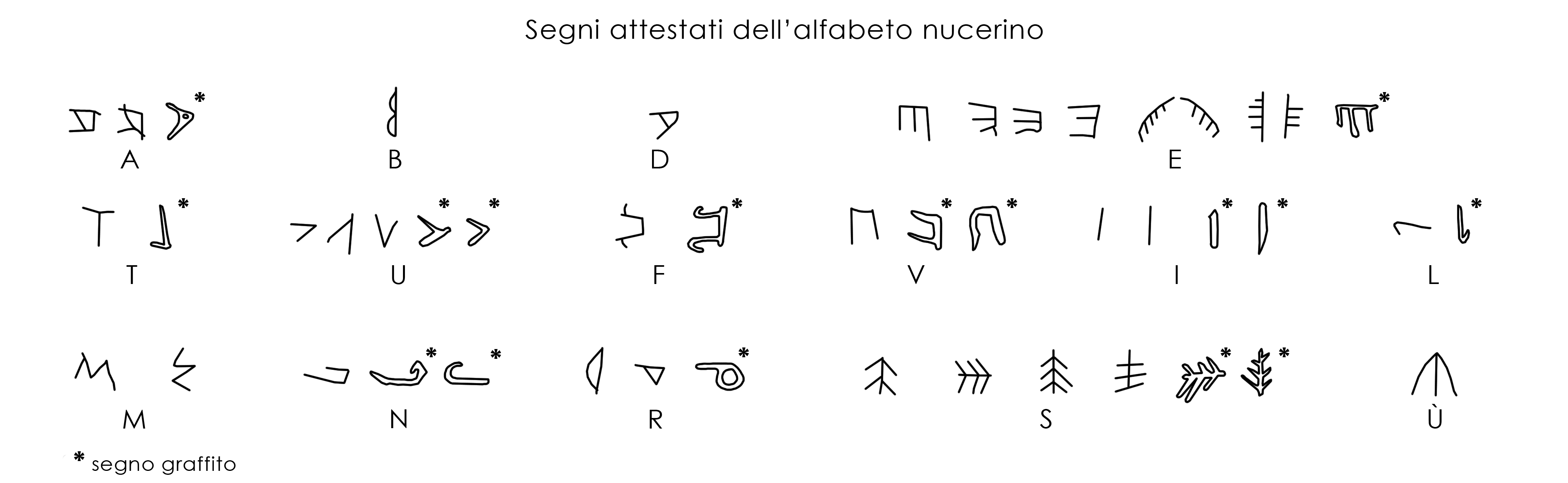

The Nucerian alphabet is based on inscriptions found in southern Italy (Nocera Superiore, Sorrento, Vico Equense and other places). It is attested only between the 6th and the 5th century BC. The most notable sign is the /S/, shaped like a fir tree, and possibly a derivation from the Phoenician alphabet.

=== Rhaetic alphabets ===
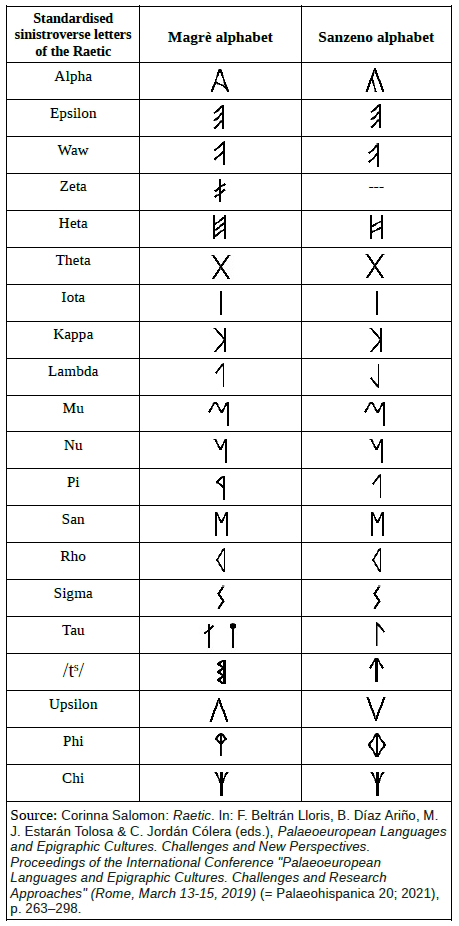
The Raetic alphabets

Attested in almost 400 inscriptions from mainly the Trentino and South Tyrol regions of Northern Italy, and North Tyrol (Austria) in two distinct alphabets: the alphabet of Sanzeno, and the alphabet of Magrè (near Schio). It was used to write the Rhaetic language.

=== Venetic alphabet ===
Alphabet of Este: Similar but not identical to that of Magrè, Venetic inscriptions.

=== Camunic alphabet ===
Inscribed abecedaria and other short inscriptions found on rock drawings in Valcamonica.

=== Latin alphabet ===
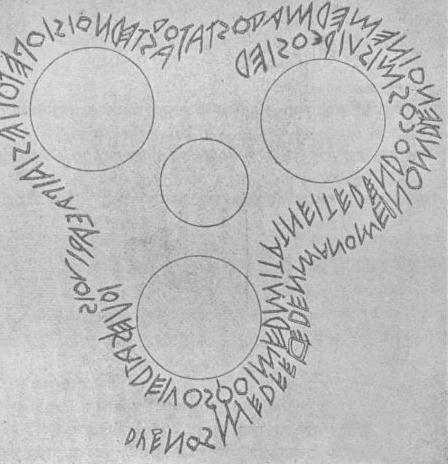
Duenos inscription, 6th century BC

21 of the 26 archaic Etruscan letters were adopted for Old Latin from the 7th century BC, either directly from the Cumae alphabet, or via archaic Etruscan forms, compared to the classical Etruscan alphabet retaining B, D, K, O, Q, X but dropping 𐌈, 𐌎, 𐌑, 𐌘 and 𐌙.

𐌀	𐌁	𐌂	𐌃	𐌄	𐌅	𐌆	𐌇	𐌉	𐌊	𐌋	𐌌	𐌍	𐌏	𐌐	𐌒	𐌓	𐌔	𐌕	𐌖	𐌗
A	B	C	D	E	F	Z	H	I	K	L	M	N	O	P	Q	R	S	T	V	X

=== South Picene alphabet ===
The South Picene alphabet, known from the 6th century BC, is most like the southern Etruscan alphabet in that it uses Q for /k/ and K for /g/. ⟨.⟩ is a reduced ⟨o⟩ and ⟨:⟩ is a reduced ⟨8⟩, used for /f/.

== Unicode ==
The Old Italic alphabets were unified and added to the Unicode Standard in March 2001 with the release of version 3.1. The Unicode block for Old Italic is U+10300–U+1032F without specification of a particular alphabet (i.e. the Old Italic alphabets are considered equivalent, and the font used will determine the variant).

Writing direction (right-to-left, left-to-right, or boustrophedon) varies based on the language and even the time period. For simplicity most scholars use left-to-right and this is the Unicode default direction for the Old Italic block. For this reason, the glyphs in the code chart are shown with left-to-right orientation.

Old Italic^{[1]}^{[2]} Official Unicode Consortium code chart (PDF)
	0	1	2	3	4	5	6	7	8	9	A	B	C	D	E	F
U+1030x	𐌀	𐌁	𐌂	𐌃	𐌄	𐌅	𐌆	𐌇	𐌈	𐌉	𐌊	𐌋	𐌌	𐌍	𐌎	𐌏
U+1031x	𐌐	𐌑	𐌒	𐌓	𐌔	𐌕	𐌖	𐌗	𐌘	𐌙	𐌚	𐌛	𐌜	𐌝	𐌞	𐌟
U+1032x	𐌠	𐌡	𐌢	𐌣										𐌭	𐌮	𐌯
Notes 1.As of Unicode version 18.0 2.Grey areas indicate non-assigned code points

== See also ==
- Euboean alphabet
- Alphabets of Asia Minor
- Linear A
- Linear B
- Old European script
- Trojan script
