= CSA keyboard =

Official keyboard layout of Canada

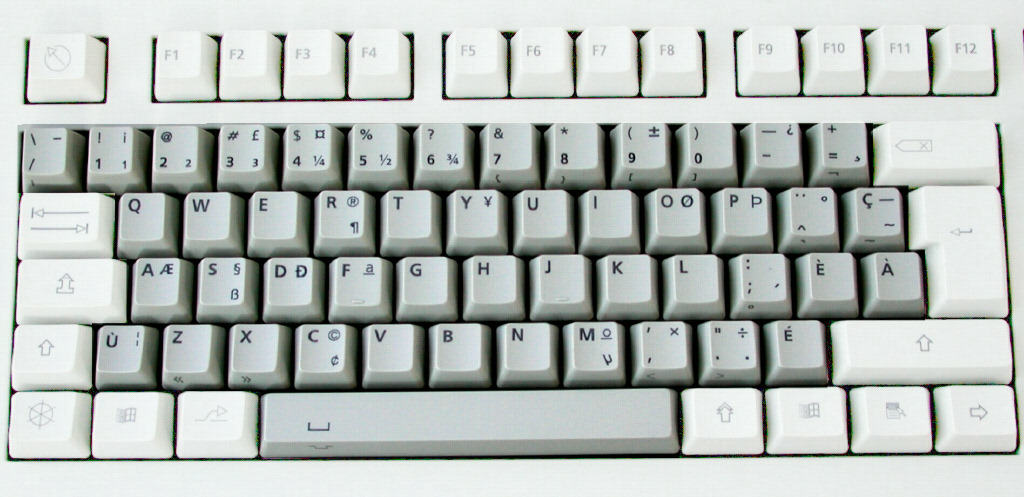
Figure 1: CSA keyboard, compliance level B (group 1/2a). In the Quebec Standard SGQRI-001 (2006), the Œ sign is also included.

The CSA keyboard, or CAN/CSA Z243.200-92, also called Canadian keyboard standard for the English and French languages, is the official keyboard layout of Canada. Often referred to as ACNOR, it is best known for its use in the Canadian computer industry for the Canadian French ACNOR keyboard layout, published as CAN/CSA Z243.200-92.

ACNOR is an acronym of the French name (Association canadienne de normalisation) of the CSA Group, a standards organization headquartered in Canada. The initialism CSA (from the former English name Canadian Standards Association) is also used in both official languages.

== Purpose and scope of the standard ==
The second edition of the standard, published in 1992, addresses the arrangement of characters on the 48-key and 47-key alphanumeric sections of the keyboard. It is the culmination of two years of experimentation aimed at revising the preliminary 1988 standard CAN/CSA Z243.200-1988.

The Canadian standard CAN/CSA Z243.200-92 specifies a number of requirements for computer keyboards in Canada. It consists of a primary layout designed to facilitate the input of characters commonly used in Canada and to support writing in both official languages. A secondary layout is also standardized. When combined with the primary layout, it extends character coverage to Latin Alphabet No. 1, as defined by the single-byte character encoding standard ISO/IEC 8859-1, through the inclusion of characters from Group 2a, or to the Latin alphabet defined by the character encoding standard ISO/IEC 6937, through the inclusion of characters from Groups 1, 2a and 2b. The standard also conforms to Parts 1, 2, 3 and 7 of ISO/IEC 9995.

The standard does not seek to specify or select any particular coded character set or communication protocol. Furthermore, it does not address the following:

1. Display methods or mechanisms;
2. The functional and technical aspects of its implementation;
3. Fonts and typefaces;
4. The positioning and representation of graphical symbols on the keys;
5. The shape, dimensions and colour of the keyboard keys;
6. The mechanism for entering control characters.

== General principles of the CSA keyboard ==
The standard has undergone some changes but remains focused on the principle of eliminating dead keys as much as possible, using dedicated Ç, È, À, É and Ù keys. For example, the dead key for the cedilla (which can apply to different letters) on the traditional Canadian French IBM ID 058 keyboards was replaced in the primary group with a Ç key, since it is the only letter in French with this diacritic. The cedilla dead key is still present in the secondary group 2a (see Figure 2) in the Canadian standard. It is possible to completely do without the dead key for the grave accent, as the three letters that use it in French (⟨À⟩, ⟨È⟩, and ⟨Ù⟩) are directly accessible in both lowercase and uppercase on this keyboard. However, the grave accent (dead key) remains in the primary group to type ⟨Ù⟩ on an ANSI key arrangement, which lacks a key to the left of Z key. In Figure 2, the rectangles indicate a dead key for a diacritic.

Figure 2: The Windows version differs from the official standard in terms of the location of dead keys (middle dot ·, tilde ~) and the absence of a few characters, including đ, ⅛ and the dot above ˙. The euro sign € was not included in the Canadian standard in 1992 and is not officially included in the standard yet (R2021). Microsoft added this symbol in 1999 (4 and E keys), following both ISO 9995-3 and CEN TC 304 standards.

Figure 2 provides a clearer illustration of the characters that can be accessed in the primary group using the Level 3 Select key ⇮ (AltGr), represented in red by two superimposed arrows resembling a Christmas tree. The greater-than sign ⟨>⟩ on key B09 is one example. The middle dot ⟨·⟩, located at Level 1 of the secondary group, is accessed using the Group 2 Select key ⇨, represented by a blue right-pointing arrow and corresponding to the right Control key on the keyboard. Combining the Group 2 Select key ⇨ with the Level 2 Select key ⇧, represented by a black arrow, allows the division sign ⟨÷⟩ to be entered. Pressing the Level 2 Select key ⇧ produces the double quotation mark ⟨"⟩ in the primary group. Finally, to enter a character directly from Level 1 of the primary group (Group 1), simply press the corresponding key, such as the full stop ⟨.⟩, key B09.

Representation of levels and groups on key B09 of a CAN/CSA Z243.200-92 keyboard
	Group 1	Group 2 ⇨
Level 2 ⇧	"	÷
Level 1	. (dot)	· (middle dot)
Level 3 ⇮	>	

Notes: The primary group consists of three levels, whereas the secondary group has only two, allowing for a maximum of five character combinations per key.

== History and context ==
CAN/CSA Z243.200-92 superseded a preliminary standard published in 1988. The latter was based on the work that led to the development of CSA/CAN3-Z243.19-85, a standard governing the arrangement of keys on typewriters used for French and English. The keyboard was designed by Alain LaBonté, an information technology consultant for the Government of Quebec, who also authored several publications that helped facilitate the international use of French in computing.

According to Alain LaBonté, certain decisions regarding character placement on the keys were suboptimal and deviated from his original design. For example, in the final version of the standard, the Government of Canada negotiated a compromise behind closed doors with the Government of Quebec to retain certain features of the IBM Canadian French ID-058 keyboard in the Canadian standard. Notably, the standard did not require any character representing an apostrophe to be available at Level 1 of the layout, a significant drawback for French and one shared by all French-language keyboard layouts implemented in Canada. In return, it was agreed that the overall design developed by LaBonté would remain unchanged. A commitment was also made to require this keyboard in Canadian public procurement tenders.

In the early 1990s, a survey of French speakers in Quebec and elsewhere in Canada found that 71% expressed a strong preference for a keyboard layout requiring fewer dead-key combinations, in which a dead key must be pressed before another key (for example, ` followed by ⇧ Shift+e to produce ⟨È⟩). This finding supported Alain LaBonté's initiative and validated his work on the standardization committees.

== Technical specification ==
Figure 3: Canadian standard CAN/CSA Z243.200-92. Graphical representation of the input characters from group 1 or primary (black). The characters from group 2a (purple) and 2b (green) are part of the secondary group.

The Canadian standard defines three explicit compliance levels and one implicit level:

1. Compliance level A includes the characters from Group 1 (or primary group) for writing in French and English, excluding ⟨œ⟩, ⟨Œ⟩ and ⟨Ÿ⟩ from Group 2b, which are not supported by the ISO/IEC 8859-1 standard (in black in Figure 3).
2. Compliance level B must include the characters from Group 2a (shown in purple in Figure 3), in addition to those from Group 1 (in black), while being limited to the characters of the ISO/IEC 8859-1 standard. Characters from Group 2b go beyond the compliance level B of the national standard.
3. Compliance level C corresponds to the full version (Groups 1, 2a, and 2b), allowing for the typing of every character from ISO/IEC 8859-1, extending support to all characters from ISO/IEC 6937, strictly. Compliance level C requires a custom driver that integrates all required characters.
4. Finally, the Canadian standard had an "implicit" compliance level that does not conform to the previous levels. In such cases, the standard states that it defaults to level A. A keyboard compliant with the ISO/IEC 8859-15 standard, for example, would require the removal of certain characters in Group 2a, such as fractions ⟨¼⟩, ⟨½⟩ and ⟨¾⟩, in order to include ⟨œ⟩, ⟨Œ⟩ and ⟨Ÿ⟩ (uppercase) from Group 2b. The ANSI key arrangement is compliant only with level A of the national standard, as the broken vertical bar ⟨¦⟩, part of Group 2a, is missing. In fact, only the ISO key arrangement can achieve compliance level B and C.

The Quebec standard SGQRI-001 also has included the ligature ⟨Œ⟩ since 2006, in addition to the characters from Group 1 and 2a, going beyond compliance level B of the Canadian standard. The presence of this character is part of a subgroup conforming to ISO/IEC 9995-3:2002 (Common secondary group). The characters in green (Group 2b in Figure 2) were not included in most keyboards and drivers, partly due to the limitation of the ISO/IEC 8859-1 encoding and the limited availability of Unicode on computers until the early 2000s.

The ring-above diacritic ⟨˚⟩, which should not be confused with the degree sign ⟨°⟩ and the ordinal indicator ⟨º⟩, is part of Group 2b, while the letter ⟨Å⟩ and ⟨å⟩ from Swedish, produced by pressing ring-above then A, are in Group 2a. For the macron ⟨¯⟩, the standalone character (with spacing) is part of Group 2a, but accented characters like ⟨Ā⟩ and ⟨ā⟩ are considered scholarly letters (Group 2b), which go beyond level B compliance (Groups 1/2a). These characters are present in ISO/IEC 6937 but not in ISO/IEC 8859-1. Indeed, the use of this diacritic allows writing in a language other than the 14 officially supported languages on level B keyboards (Albanian, German, English, Catalan, Danish, Spanish, Finnish, French, Italian, Icelandic, Dutch, Norwegian, Portuguese, Swedish). The standalone macron character is included in the ISO/IEC 8859-1 standard. In Figure 2, these two symbols (the macron and ring-above) are coloured purple, as they provide access to at least one character in Group 2a. The symbol ⟨Ÿ⟩, produced by pressing diaeresis (Group 1) then Y key (Group 1), is in Group 2b, while ⟨ÿ⟩ (lowercase), produced by pressing diaeresis (Group 1) then ⟨y⟩ (Group 1), is in Group 1. For more details, the official document includes a detailed list of the characters from Groups 1, 2a, and 2b.

=== ISO/IEC 8859-1 and ISO/IEC 8859-15 ===
In the late 1980s and early 1990s, most personal computers used single-byte character sets (SBCS), in which each character was represented by an 8-bit value. This approach was consistent with the hardware and software constraints of the time, including limited memory and storage capacity and byte-oriented text processing. It extended ASCII by allocating additional code points to characters through various encoding systems, such as ISO/IEC 8859, national variants, and code pages.

The Latin-1 character set contains 191 graphic characters, of which 127 are included in the basic layout (Group 1) and 64 in the supplementary layout (Group 2a) of CAN/CSA Z243.200-92.

The inclusion of the lowercase and uppercase OE ligatures (œ and Œ) in the single-byte character set ISO/IEC 8859-1, limited to 256 code points, was rejected during the international standardization process. According to Alain LaBonté, this was partly due to opposition from the French delegation, particularly employees of Bull Information Systems representing the Association française de normalisation (AFNOR) on the standardization committees. In 1987, they argued that these characters were not essential for writing French and were of little practical relevance. ⟨Œ⟩ and ⟨œ⟩ were originally intended to occupy the code points ultimately assigned to the multiplication sign ⟨×⟩ and division sign ⟨÷⟩, respectively. At the time, the Canadian position was defended by English-speaking representatives who were not sufficiently equipped to counter these objections and advocate for the inclusion of the ligatures. Consequently, the Canadian representatives were unable to secure sufficient support for their position.

As a result, the two characters were not incorporated into the Quebec standard SGQRI-001 until 2006, as the standard was initially based on the Latin-1 character set (ISO/IEC 8859-1) rather than the full character repertoire of ISO/IEC 6937. Overall, the implementation choices reflected in CAN/CSA Z243.200-92 were influenced both by the technical limitations of computers at the time and by competing interests among national delegations involved in international standardization, each seeking to advance its own position.

The uppercase letter ⟨Ÿ⟩ was also absent from the original ISO/IEC 8859-1 character set, although it is considerably less common in French and occurs notably in certain French place names, such as L'Haÿ-les-Roses.

Although the Latin capital letter D with stroke ⟨Đ⟩ (U+0110) belongs to Group 2a of the CSA standard, it is not included in the Latin-1 character set (ISO/IEC 8859-1). Instead, Latin-1 includes the Latin capital letter Eth ⟨Ð⟩ (U+00D0), which is used in Icelandic.

==== ISO/IEC 8859-1 (Latin Alphabet No. 1) and ISO/IEC 8859-15 (Latin Alphabet No. 9) ====
ISO/IEC 8859-1
	0	1	2	3	4	5	6	7	8	9	A	B	C	D	E	F
0x																
1x																
2x	SP	!	"	#	$	%	&	'	(	)	*	+	,	-	.	/
3x	0	1	2	3	4	5	6	7	8	9	:	;	<	=	>	?
4x	@	A	B	C	D	E	F	G	H	I	J	K	L	M	N	O
5x	P	Q	R	S	T	U	V	W	X	Y	Z	[	\	]		_
6x	`	a	b	c	d	e	f	g	h	i	j	k	l	m	n	o
7x	p	q	r	s	t	u	v	w	x	y	z	{	|	}	~	
8x																
9x																
Ax	NBSP	¡	¢	£	¤	¥	¦	§	¨	©	ª	«	¬	SHY	®	¯
Bx	°	±	²	³	´	µ	¶	·	¸	¹	º	»	¼	½	¾	¿
Cx	À	Á	Â	Ã	Ä	Å	Æ	Ç	È	É	Ê	Ë	Ì	Í	Î	Ï
Dx	Ð	Ñ	Ò	Ó	Ô	Õ	Ö	×	Ø	Ù	Ú	Û	Ü	Ý	Þ	ß
Ex	à	á	â	ã	ä	å	æ	ç	è	é	ê	ë	ì	í	î	ï
Fx	ð	ñ	ò	ó	ô	õ	ö	÷	ø	ù	ú	û	ü	ý	þ	ÿ
Undefined Symbols and punctuation Undefined in the first release of ECMA-94 (1985). In the original draft Œ was at 0xD7 and œ was at 0xF7.

Notes: The characters ⟨œ⟩, ⟨Œ⟩, and uppercase ⟨Ÿ⟩ are absent, although they are needed for proper French typography. The Latin capital ligature OE ⟨Œ⟩ and Latin small ligature OE ⟨œ⟩ were originally intended to occupy the code points assigned to the multiplication sign ⟨×⟩ and division sign ⟨÷⟩, respectively.

===== Differences Between ISO/IEC 8859-15 and ISO/IEC 8859-1 =====
	A4	A6	A8	B4	B8	BC	BD	BE
8859-1	¤	¦	¨	´	¸	¼	½	¾
8859-15	€	Š	š	Ž	ž	Œ	œ	Ÿ

By comparison, ISO/IEC 8859-15 (Latin Alphabet No. 9) introduced several characters missing from ISO/IEC 8859-1, including ⟨œ⟩, ⟨Œ⟩, and ⟨Ÿ⟩ for proper French typography, ⟨ž⟩, ⟨Ž⟩, ⟨š⟩, and ⟨Š⟩ for Finnish loanwords, and the euro sign ⟨€⟩. These characters were added by replacing others from the original character set. However, ISO/IEC 8859-15 never achieved widespread adoption, as it was soon superseded by the broader adoption of Unicode and ISO/IEC 10646, which overcame the limitations of single-byte character sets.

=== ISO/IEC 6937 and ISO 10646 MES-1, collection 281 ===
ISO/IEC 6937 is a character set designed for text communication, primarily for languages using the Latin alphabet, developed at a time when text exchange largely relied on 8-bit environments. Rather than assigning a separate code to every accented letter, the standard provides, among other features, non-spacing diacritics that can be combined with base letters, allowing a wide range of accented characters to be represented efficiently using a limited character repertoire. This approach has been adopted or referenced in several telecommunications and broadcasting standards, particularly in ETSI specifications related to teletext and DVB signalling, where character tables explicitly rely on ISO/IEC 6937, sometimes with extensions.

ISO/IEC 6937 or ITU T.51 (Latin)
	0	1	2	3	4	5	6	7	8	9	A	B	C	D	E	F
0x																
1x																
2x	SP	!	"	#	$/¤ (Note: Continued use for ¤ permitted for existing CCITT services only.)	%	&	'	(	)	*	+	,	-	.	/
3x	0	1	2	3	4	5	6	7	8	9	:	;	<	=	>	?
4x	@	A	B	C	D	E	F	G	H	I	J	K	L	M	N	O
5x	P	Q	R	S	T	U	V	W	X	Y	Z	[	\	]		_
6x	`	a	b	c	d	e	f	g	h	i	j	k	l	m	n	o
7x	p	q	r	s	t	u	v	w	x	y	z	{	|	}	~	
8x																
9x																
Ax	NBSP	¡	¢	£	$ (Note: Permitted for existing CCITT services only, otherwise the ASCII representation should be used.)	¥	#	§	¤	‘	“	«	←	↑	→	↓
Bx	°	±	²	³	×	µ	¶	·	÷	’	”	»	¼	½	¾	¿
Cx		◌̀	◌́	◌̂	◌̃	◌̄	◌̆	◌̇	◌̈		◌̊	◌̧	◌̲ (Note: Noted in the ITU version of the standard as having existing use for underlined text, in combination with any other character including accented characters. Although the 1988 ITU edition includes this code, the 1992 ITU edition discourages sending this code in favour of ANSI escape sequences, although it does mention that it should be correctly interpreted when received by applicable systems. Previous editions of the ISO/IEC version of the standard also allowed combining this code with any character in the defined repertoire, whereas more recent revisions do not include this code.)	◌̋	◌̨	◌̌
Dx	―	¹	®	©	™	♪	¬	¦					⅛	⅜	⅝	⅞
Ex	Ω	Æ	Đ/Ð	ª	Ħ	(Note: An early draft placed ȷ in this position.)	Ĳ	Ŀ	Ł	Ø	Œ	º	Þ	Ŧ	Ŋ	ŉ
Fx	ĸ	æ	đ	ð	ħ	ı	ĳ	ŀ	ł	ø	œ	ß	þ	ŧ	ŋ	SHY

Differences from T.61

In this standard, combining an alphabetic letter with a graphic character (diacritical mark) allows additional characters to be represented using two-byte sequences.

==== ISO/IEC 6937 Precomposed Characters Encoded as Two-Byte Sequences ====
Accent	Code	Second character	Result
Grave	0xC1	AEIOUaeiou	ÀÈÌÒÙàèìòù
Acute	0xC2	ACEILNORSUYZacegilnorsuyz	ÁĆÉÍĹŃÓŔŚÚÝŹáćéģíĺńóŕśúýź
Circumflex	0xC3	ACEGHIJOSUWYaceghijosuwy	ÂĈÊĜĤÎĴÔŜÛŴŶâĉêĝĥîĵôŝûŵŷ
Tilde	0xC4	AINOUainou	ÃĨÑÕŨãĩñõũ
Macron	0xC5	AEIOUaeiou	ĀĒĪŌŪāēīōū
Breve	0xC6	AGUagu	ĂĞŬăğŭ
Dot	0xC7	CEGIZcegz	ĊĖĠİŻċėġż
Umlaut or diæresis	0xC8	AEIOUYaeiouy	ÄËÏÖÜŸäëïöüÿ
Ring	0xCA	AUau	ÅŮåů
Cedilla	0xCB	CGKLNRSTcklnrst	ÇĢĶĻŅŖŞŢçķļņŗşţ
Double Acute	0xCD	OUou	ŐŰőű
Ogonek	0xCE	AEIUaeiu	ĄĘĮŲąęįų
Caron	0xCF	CDELNRSTZcdelnrstz	ČĎĚĽŇŘŠŤŽčďěľňřšťž

Notes: In some software implementations, the cedilla rather than the acute accent must be entered before the letter “g” to produce the Latin small letter g with cedilla (ģ).

The Multilingual European Subset 1 (MES-1) repertoire is an ISO/IEC 10646 subset created to reproduce the ISO/IEC 6937 characters set in an Unicode environment.

=== ISO/IEC 9995 (parts 1,2,3 and 7) ===
The Canadian standard CAN/CSA Z243.200-92 is based on Parts 1, 2 and 3 of ISO/IEC 9995. Part 7 addresses the use of pictograms for labelling function keys, in accordance with the requirements of the Quebec standard SGQRI 001 (2006) and the former federal government standard TBITS-5 (repealed in 2020). The symbol representing the non-breaking space on the space bar, as specified in ISO/IEC 9995-7, is included in Group 1 of the CSA standard. This function is activated by pressing the Level 3 selector key in combination with the space bar.

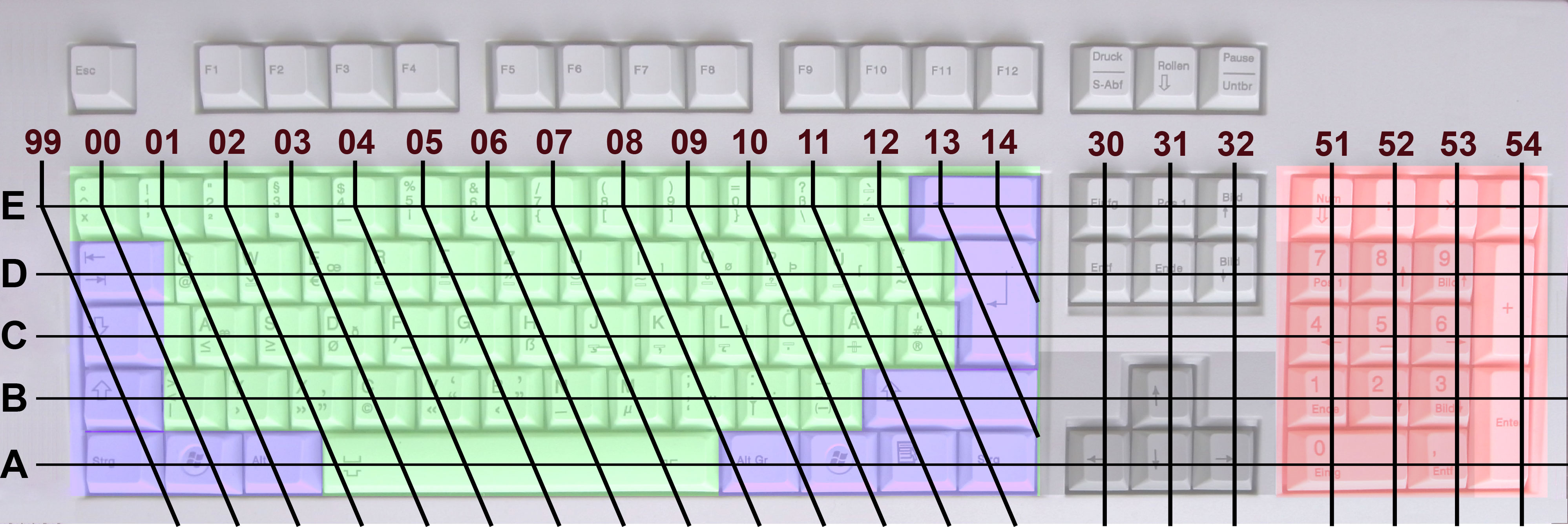
Figure 4 : ISO/IEC 9995-1 - Sections and zones, and reference grid. Legend: green: alphanumeric zone; blue: function zones; red: numeric section, including dark red: numeric zone and light red: function zone. All remaining areas (in grey) belong to the editing and function section, including dark grey: cursor key zone and light grey: editing function zone.

Figure 5: ISO 9995-3:2010 (third edition), Outdated Common Secondary Group The Outdated Common Secondary Group is supported for the layout based on the ISO 6937 and Multilingual European Subsets 1 (MES-1) standards.

ISO/IEC 9995-1 addresses the positioning of keys on the keyboard (e.g. D03 for the letter E).

ISO/IEC 9995-2 specifies the placement of function keys. The Level 2 selector key, for example, must be positioned to the left of the Ù (B00) or Z (B01) key and to the right of the É (B10) key. The Level 3 selector key (AltGr) must be positioned to the left of the Group 2 selector key.

The ISO/IEC 9995-3:2010 standard specifies the placement of the Outdated Common Secondary Group and characters on a key (these must be aligned to the right of the primary group). The standard can serve as a reference for including a subgroup of characters in a layout that goes beyond the level of conformity described by the Canadian standard CAN/CSA Z243.200-92. Certain characters from group 2b or others not integrated into the CSA standard, such as the euro sign, can be included by referring to them as a subgroup of the ISO/IEC 9995-3:2010 standard, in addition to the supported level of conformity. In the third edition from 2010, the Outdated common secondary group is based on MES-1 instead of ISO/IEC 6937.

In Part 7 of the ISO/IEC 9995 standard, standardized pictograms provide neutral and efficient labeling, avoiding the need to transcribe legends in both French and English. These symbols have also, for the most part, been integrated into Unicode for several years. The symbol for selecting level 3 is represented in the ISO/IEC 9995-7 standard with two overlapping arrows, resembling a Christmas tree. The selection key for group 2 is an arrow pointing to the right (blue arrow). The government standard for the Quebec public service SGQRI-001 requires the use of standardized pictograms following the ISO/IEC 9995-7 standard or function key labelling in French only in its calls for tenders. The Canadian TBITS-5 standard also recommends this at the federal level. The CAN/CSA Z243.200-92 standard, on the other hand, does not require the use of pictograms for labelling function keys. However, the use of the pictogram for the non-breaking space bar is mentioned in the document.

The labelling of dead keys with rectangles and the soft hyphen in parentheses (-), goes beyond Canadian and Quebec standards.

ISO/IEC 9995-7 (Basic pictograms used in the Quebec standard SGQRI 001)

1 Level 2 Selection ISO-7000 0251 (U+21E7)

3 Caps Lock ISO-7000 2011 (U+21EC)

4 Num Lock ISO-7000 2012 (U+21ED)

5 Level 3 Selection ISO-7000 2013 (U+21EE)

7 Group 2 Selection ISO-7000 0251 (U+21E8)

8 Group 2 Lock ISO 7000 - 2010 (U+21F0)

9 Space ISO-7000 2915 (U+2423)

10 Non-breaking space ISO-7000 2016 (U+237D)

11 Insertion ISO-7000 2017 (U+2380)

17 Backspace ISO-7000 2023 (U+232B)

18 Delete ISO-7000 1028 (U+2425)

20 Scroll Lock ISO-7000 2025 (U+21F3)

22 Print Screen ISO-7000 2027 (U+2399)

23 Return ISO-7000 0651 (U+21B5)

24 Enter ISO-7000 1025 (U+2386)

25 Alternative ISO-7000 2105 (U+2387)

26 Control ISO-7000 2028 (U+2388)

27 Pause IEC 417-5111 (U+2389)

28 Interruption IEC 417-5110 (U+238A)

29 Escape ISO-7000 2029 (U+238B)

31 Cursor up IEC 417-5107 (U+2191)

32 Cursor down IEC 417-5107 (U+2193)

33 Cursor left IEC 417-5107 (U+2190)

34 Cursor right IEC 417-5107 (U+2192)

39 Home ISO-7000 2031 (U+21F1)

40 End ISO-7000 2032 (U+21F2)

41 Page up ISO-7000 2033 (U+2397)

42 Page down ISO-7000 2034 (U+2398)

43 Left Tab ISO-7000 0001 (U+21E5)

44 Right Tab ISO-7000 0001 (U+2B7E)

62 Decimal separator ISO-7000 1859 (U+2396)

Notes : Number of the pictogram corresponding to the ISO/IEC 9995-7 standard, followed in order by its definition, the ISO 7000 or IEC 417 number, and the Unicode character for entering it on the computer. Some pictograms require the installation of a compatible font.

== Software implementation ==
Figure 6 : The two leftmost keys illustrate the location of the euro sign on the Canadian Multilingual Standard (CMS) keyboard layout in Microsoft Windows. The key on the right shows its location on the French (Canada) – CSA keyboard layout in macOS.

Beginning in 1999, implementations of the standard in Microsoft Windows, Apple's macOS and Linux added the euro sign ⟨€⟩, reflecting changes to ISO/IEC 9995-3.

On Microsoft Windows, the implementation of the standard from 1992, known as "Canadian Multilingual Standard Keyboard Layout (KBDCAN)", also called CMS, differs slightly from the Canadian standard in the placement of dead keys (middle dot ⟨·⟩ and tilde ⟨~⟩), the inclusion of the euro sign ⟨€⟩, and the omission of several characters, including the Latin small letter d with stroke ⟨đ⟩, the fraction one eighth ⟨⅛⟩, and the dot above ⟨˙⟩. The Latin capital letter Eth ⟨Ð⟩ (U+00D0) is used instead of the Latin capital letter D with stroke ⟨Đ⟩ (U+0110).

Microsoft Windows 3/NT/95/98 included an implementation closely resembling the preliminary version of the standard (1988), called "Canadian French Keyboard Layout (KBDFC)". More recent versions, following Windows XP, refer to this layout as the "Canadian French (Legacy)" keyboard. The Canadian French (Legacy) keyboard layout should not be confused with the French (Canada) layout, also formerly called "Keyboard Layout for ca (KBDCA)" or actually "Canadian Multilingual Keyboard Layout (KBDCA)" in the technical name, which is itself based on the traditional IBM Canadian French 058 keyboard layout.

The default Apple's implementation, "French (Canada) - CSA", does not officially support the secondary group of the Canadian standard, limiting it to compliance level A, intended for writing in French and English only. In the macOS, iPadOS and iOS implementations, the euro sign ⟨€⟩ is located at Level 3 of the primary group on the 4 key (E04), although the character is not physically printed on the keyboard. The "French (Canada) - CSA" keyboard layout should not be confused with the "French (Canada) - PC" layout, which is itself based on the traditional IBM Canadian French 058 keyboard layout.

The Canadian (CSA) layout in Linux is currently the implementation that most closely matches compliance level C of CAN/CSA Z243.200-92. However, it is not strictly compliant with this level, as it also incorporates certain adjustments reflecting subsequent revisions of ISO/IEC 9995-3, whose first edition in the early 1990s served as a reference for the Canadian standard. In this implementation, the ohm sign ⟨Ω⟩ (U+2126) is replaced by the Greek capital letter Omega ⟨Ω⟩ (U+03A9) on key D01. The euro sign ⟨€⟩ is added to the 4 (E04) and E (D03) keys. The generic currency sign ⟨¤⟩ (U+00A4) is relocated to Level 3 of the secondary group on key E04, in accordance with the outdated common secondary group defined in ISO/IEC 9995-3:2010 (see Figure 5). It is the only character assigned to this position. As in the Windows implementation, the Latin capital letter Eth ⟨Ð⟩ (U+00D0) is used instead of the Latin capital letter D with stroke ⟨Đ⟩ (U+0110) on key C03.

On IBM's AIX operating system, the standardized Canadian French keyboard from 1992 uses identifiers 445 (Primary Group) and 501 (Secondary Group 2a), closely to match compliance level B. To activate the Group 2 lock key ⇰, the Alt key ⎇ and the left Level 2 selector key ⇧ must be pressed together. Both keys can then be released, allowing one or more characters from secondary Group 2a to be entered. To return to the primary group, the Alt key ⎇ and the right Level 2 selector key ⇧ must be pressed together. In the secondary group (501), the Latin capital letter D with stroke ⟨Đ⟩ (U+0110) is absent from key C03. Only the Latin small letter Eth ⟨ð⟩ (U+00F0) appears in the documentation.

An implementation was also developed for the Solaris operating system. This version supports compliance level A of the Canadian national standard.

== Reception, use, and controversies ==
Role of Public Authorities in Promoting the Standard

The Quebec government has historically played a more active role in promoting the standard and continues to require it in its procurement tenders today. However, these procurement requirements remain limited to the provincial public service, excluding the education sector, universities, the healthcare system, and Crown corporations such as Hydro-Québec.

In the early 2000s, the website of the Office québécois de la langue française (OQLF) featured a list of suppliers offering keyboards compliant with the standard, as well as a testing facility allowing users to try the layout. The government agency also purchased advertising space in newspapers to promote the benefits of the standardized keyboard to the public.

The promotion of the standard was criticized by Pauline Marois, then Leader of the Official Opposition in the late 2000s, as part of a broader set of government measures intended to protect the French language, which she described as "ridiculous", including the purchase of standardized keyboards for the public service.

In its 2016-2017 annual management report, the OQLF reaffirmed its commitment to "maintaining the availability of a standardized keyboard". The 2017-2018 annual management report was among the last to explicitly mention efforts to encourage the availability and promotion of the standardized keyboard in public institutions, through a project to incorporate the Quebec keyboard standard into the Act respecting the governance and management of the information resources of public bodies and government enterprises. No references to the CSA keyboard were found in the agency's annual reports published after 2018.

The agency removed its promotional webpage in June 2022 during a redesign of its website. In October 2023, just over a year after Alain LaBonté's death in August 2022, the webpage devoted to the standardized Quebec keyboard was also removed from the website of the Treasury Board.

At the federal level, the Office of the Commissioner of Official Languages of Canada recommended in 2005 that “federal institutions take advantage of computer upgrades to ensure that CAN/CSA Z243.200-92 keyboards are installed in all federal facilities and public service locations”. The TBITS-5 standard, which applied to procurement in bilingual areas of the federal public service, was repealed in 2020.

Limited Adoption by Manufacturers

In the education sector, Apple computers were much more prevalent throughout the 1990s and until the mid-2000s, making the CSA keyboard layout more accessible, as Apple was the only major manufacturer to offer the CSA configuration by default for French-speaking users. The subsequent transition to PCs in computer laboratories did not result in procurement requirements mandating the use of standardized keyboards.

Among manufacturers, the 47-key ANSI keyboard has become increasingly widespread across the Canadian market as a cost-reduction strategy for computer products. The layout combines characters from the American keyboard with some of those found on the Canadian French 058 layout. Besides competing with the standardized keyboard, this layout lacks both the Œ ligatures, degree sign and French quotation marks.

The CSA keyboard, by contrast, was designed for both 48-key and 47-key configurations, without sacrificing features essential for proper French typography. Keyboard stickers can also be purchased to adapt the key labels of an American keyboard to the Canadian national standard.

The vast majority of manufacturers offering the CSA keyboard still limit their key legends to characters from Groups 1 and 2a, partly because Quebec government procurement requirements do not extend beyond compliance level B (Groups 1 and 2a), together with the inclusion of the Œ ligature. Furthermore, the lack of support for certain Group 2b characters in the Microsoft Windows implementation of the standard provides little incentive for manufacturers to produce keyboards that fully comply with compliance level C.

Dell and Lenovo offer the CSA/ACNOR keyboard layout as an option on their business-class laptops, either preinstalled or as a separately purchased replacement keyboard. However, the traditional Canadian French 058 layout remains more common.

Current Status

As of September 2023, the euro sign ⟨€⟩ had still not been officially incorporated into CAN/CSA Z243.200. It was added to Windows in the late 1990s, following the recommendations of ISO/IEC 9995-3, in the obsolete common secondary group (key E04) and on the E key (key D03). The placement of the euro sign on the D03 key is also found on several European keyboard layouts, including the French AZERTY layout, in accordance with CEN/TC 304.

Today, Unicode and ISO/IEC 10646 allow all characters in the secondary group (2a and 2b), as well as the euro sign ⟨€⟩, to be represented. UTF-8, widely used in modern computer systems, also overcomes the limitations of earlier single-byte character sets. Indeed, 99.1% of websites used UTF-8 as their character encoding in November 2026. The limitations associated with representing these characters have therefore disappeared, although their availability for typing still depends on software implementations.

In the Microsoft Windows layout, a character that functions both as a middle dot ⟨·⟩ when followed by a space and as a dot above when combined with the letters cegzCEIGZ ⟨ċėġżĊĖİĠŻ⟩ presents certain difficulties for labelling diacritical marks on the keyboard, departing from the official standard. A similar criticism applies to the tilde ⟨~⟩, which should not appear as a diacritical mark in the primary group. This latter issue is explicitly addressed in ISO/IEC 9995-3.

Some characters in Group 2b are also no longer recommended for general use. For example, the Latin small letter n preceded by an apostrophe ⟨ŉ⟩, formerly used in Afrikaans, is now considered obsolete and strongly discouraged. Instead, an apostrophe ⟨’⟩ followed by the letter ⟨n⟩ is recommended, using two separate characters.

The Latin small letter l with middle dot ⟨ŀ⟩ and Latin capital letter L with middle dot ⟨Ŀ⟩, used in Catalan, are supported for compatibility purposes, although the use of two separate characters, ⟨l⟩ and ⟨L⟩, followed by a middle dot ⟨·⟩, is now recommended.

Furthermore, the Greek capital letter omega ⟨Ω⟩ (U+03A9) is now generally preferred over the ohm sign ⟨Ω⟩ (U+2126), which is supported by both the Canadian standard and the international standard ISO/IEC 6937.

Evolution of International Standards

Additional symbols beyond those included in the Canadian standard and the international standards ISO/IEC 8859-1 and ISO/IEC 6937 could be incorporated in the coming years. For example, a new standard based on the Unicode character repertoire (ISO/IEC 10646) and the current common secondary group defined in the third edition of ISO/IEC 9995-3:2010 would allow the inclusion of many more symbols, including characters involving sequences of diacritics used in Vietnamese writing. A new standard could also provide better support for Indigenous languages in Canada.

The characters in the current common secondary group from ISO/IEC 9995-3:2010 occupy the same positions as those in Group 2a of the Canadian standard CAN/CSA Z243.200-92, with the exception of the currency sign ⟨¤⟩, which was replaced by the euro sign ⟨€⟩.

The fourth edition of ISO/IEC 9995-3:2026, published in January 2026, replaces the obsolete common secondary group and the current common secondary group with a new international Latin keyboard layout. It is based on an extended American QWERTY layout. This revision marks a departure from the framework on which CAN/CSA Z243.200-92 was based. However, the third edition remains in force in Canada as of November 2026, under the designation CAN/CSA-ISO/IEC 9995-3:13.

== Gallery ==
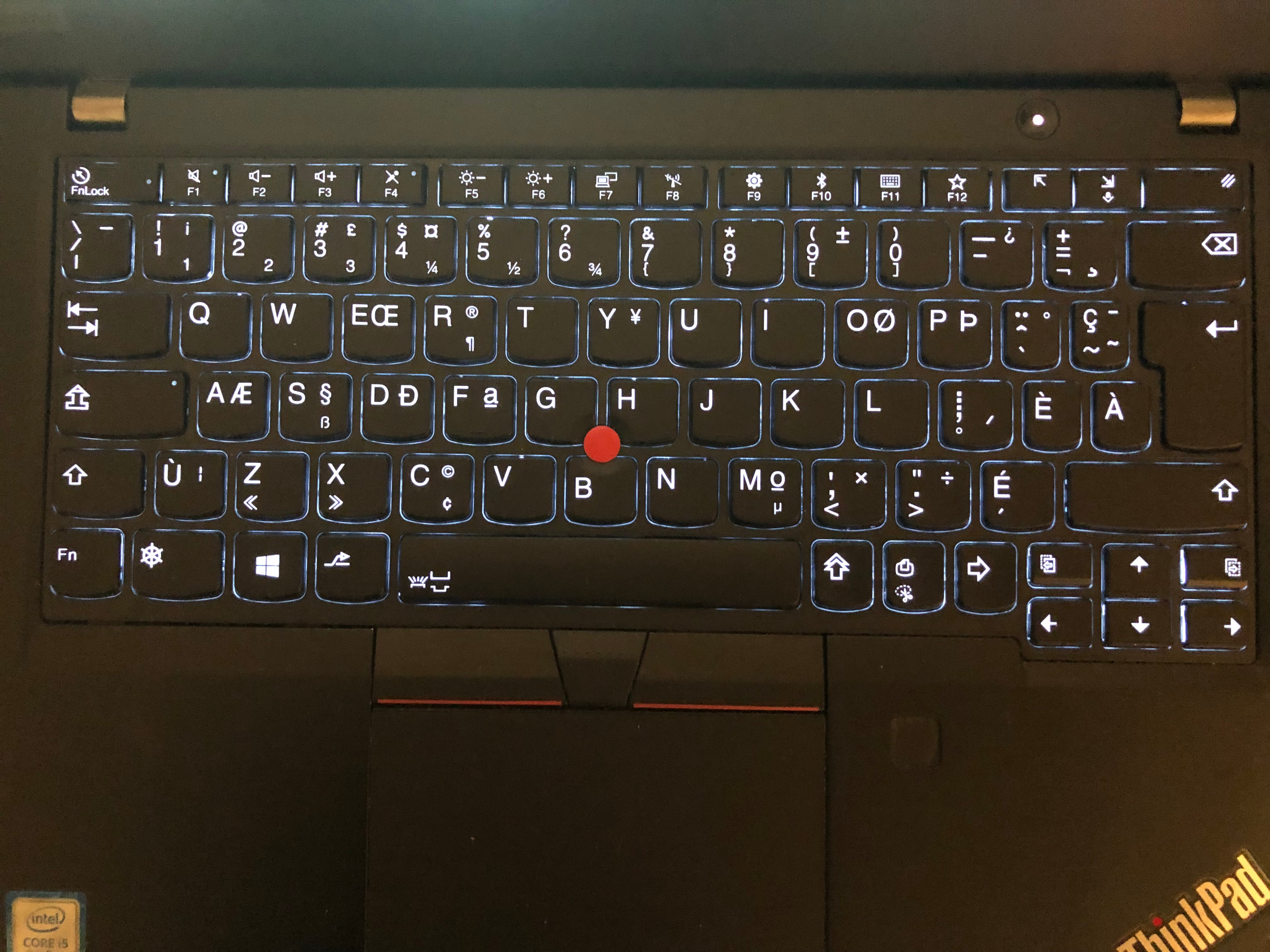
Canadian French ACNOR (Lenovo) Thinkpad X390

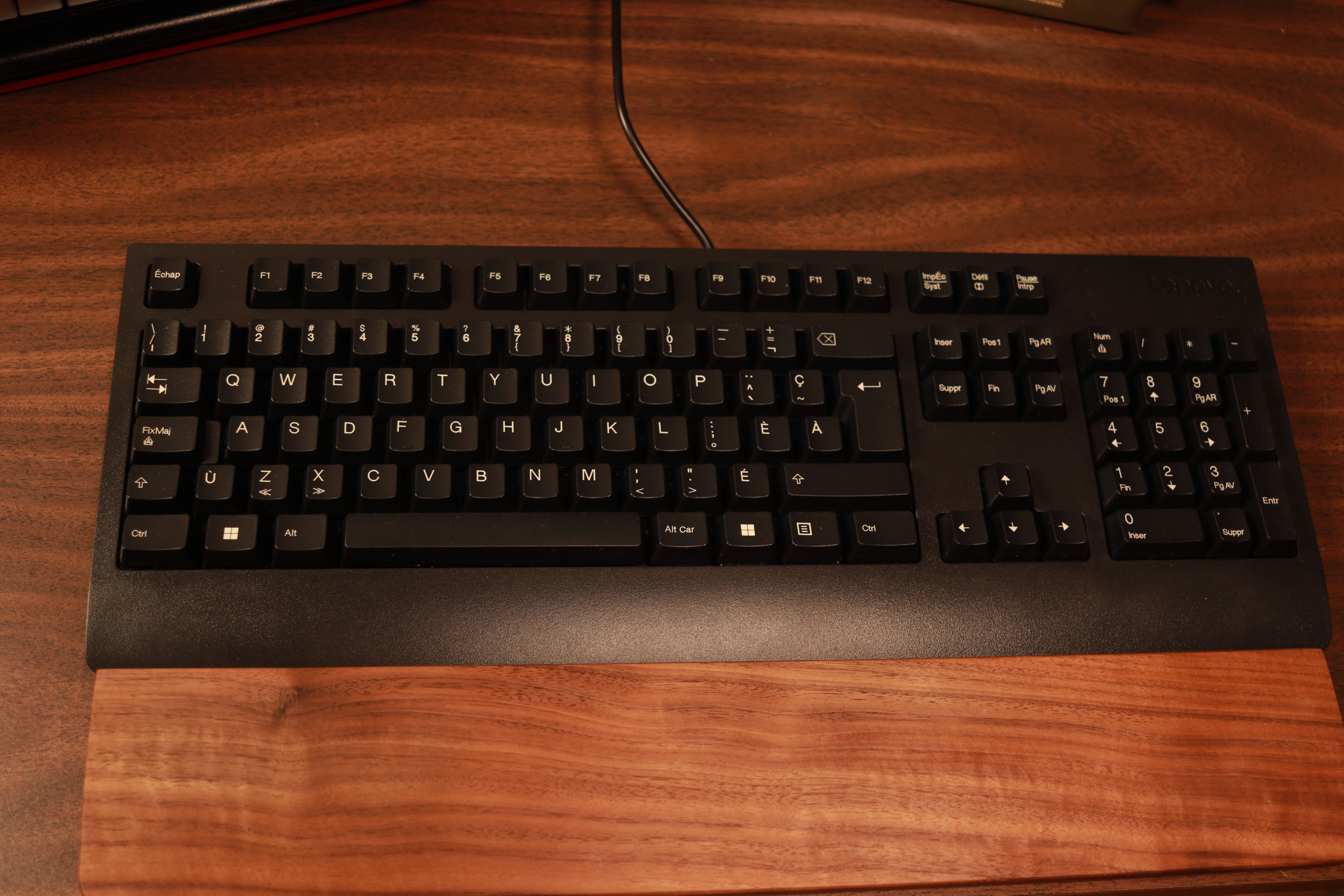
Canadian French 445 (Lenovo) number 4X30M86891

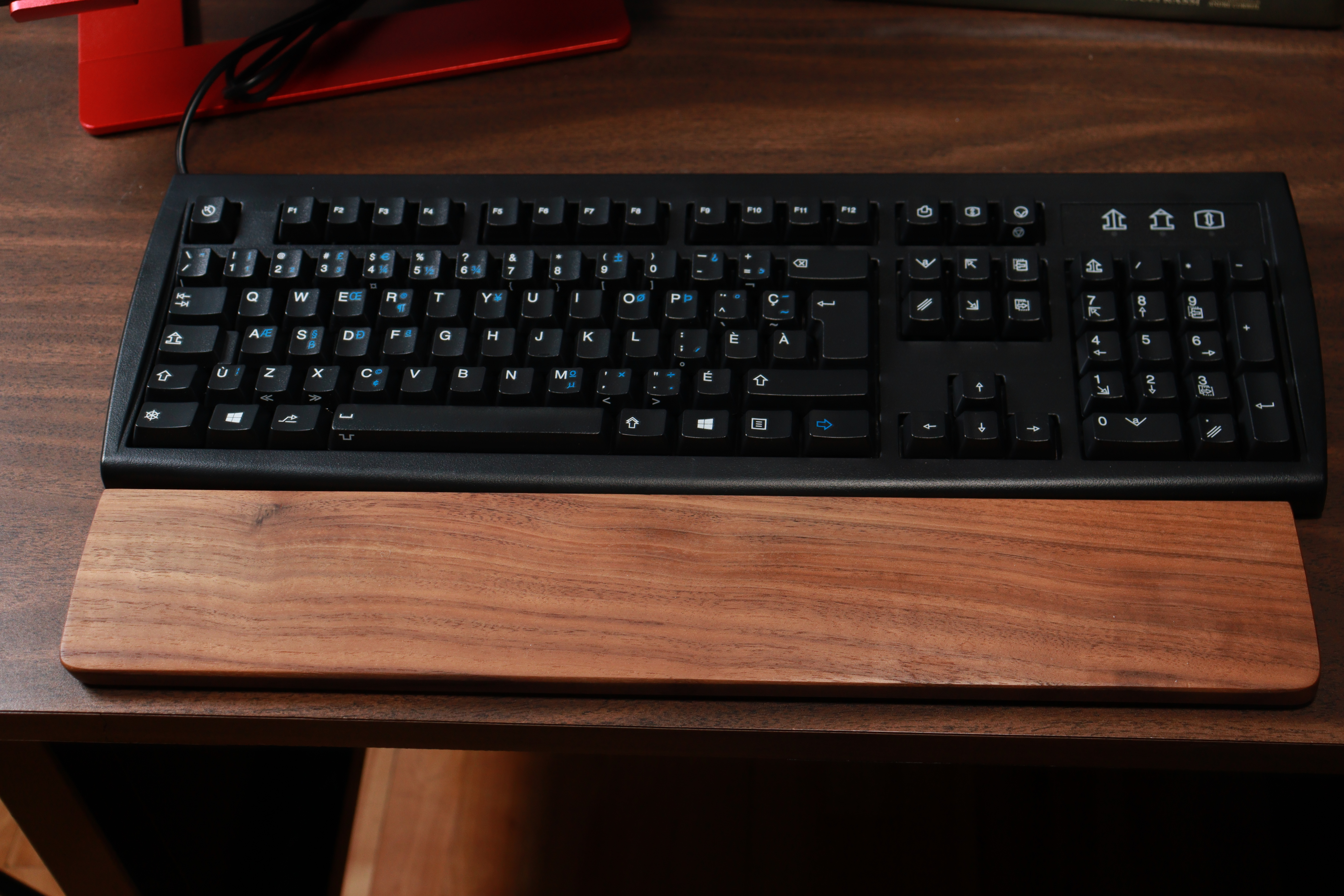
CSA Keyboard (Solidus) KBS225T5-USB-BL

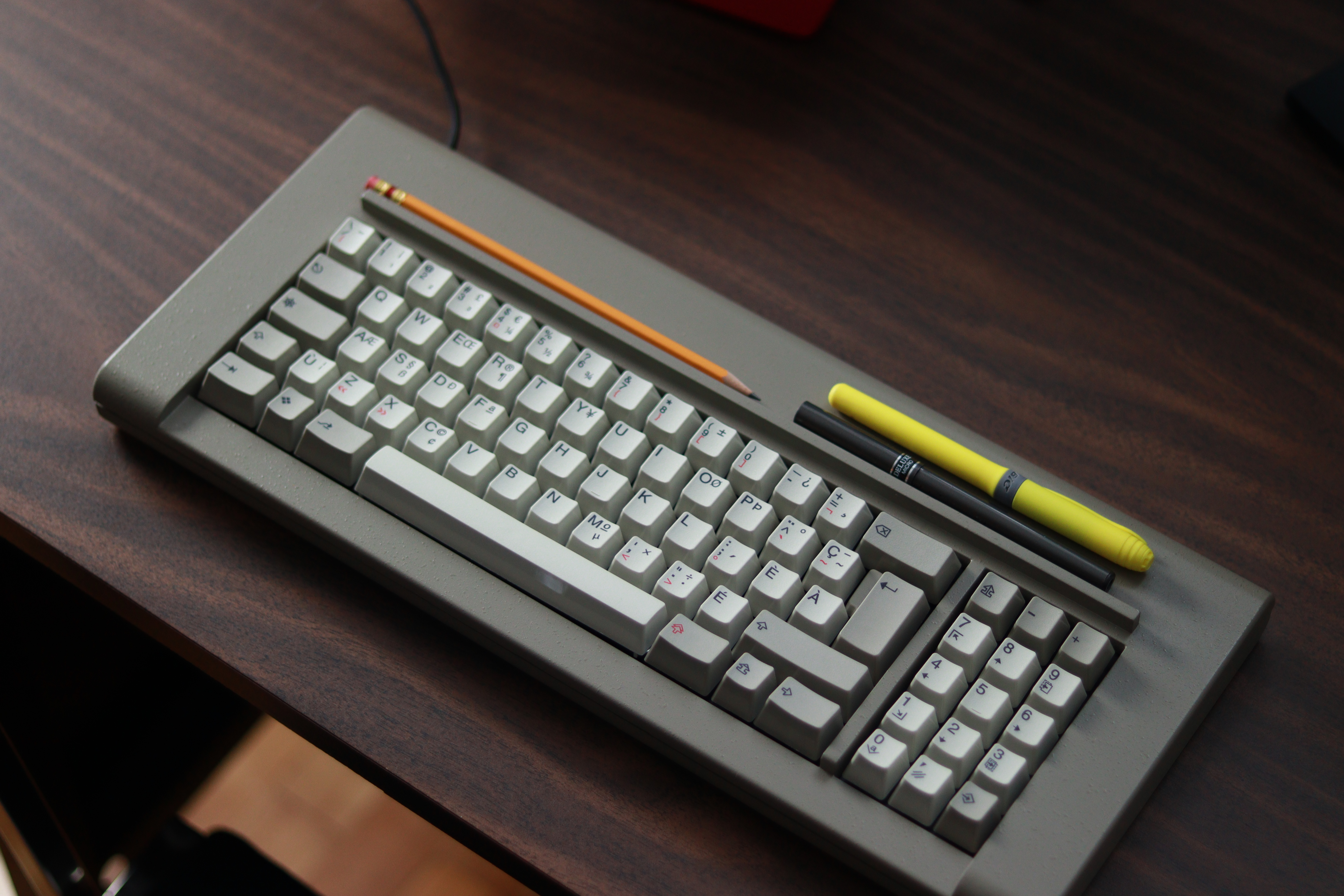
Quebec CSA (Model F Labs) Model F77

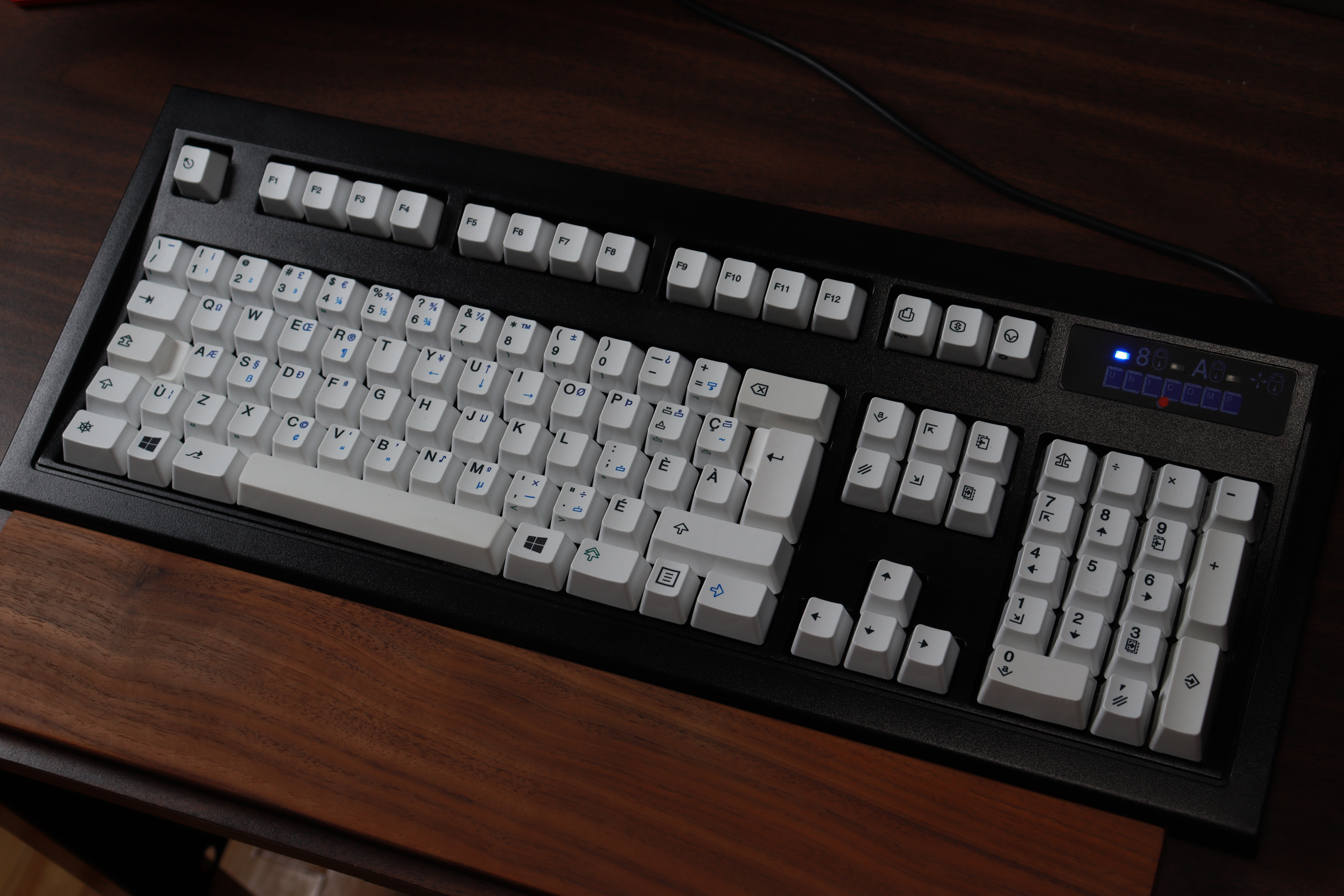
Canadian French-Multilingual (Unicomp) New Model M

== See also ==
- Keyboard layout
- QWERTY
