= ISO 5426 =

Character set developed by ISO

- Alias(es): ISO-IR-53
- Standard: ISO 5426
- Other related encodings: ETS 300 706; ISO 6937 / ITU T.51; ITU T.61; NeXT Multinational; PostScript Standard Encoding; ITU T.101

ISO 5426 ("Extension of the Latin alphabet coded character set for bibliographic information interchange") is a character set developed by ISO, similar to ISO/IEC 6937. It was first published in 1980.

== Character set ==
ISO 5426
	0	1	2	3	4	5	6	7	8	9	A	B	C	D	E	F
0x	NUL	SOH	STX	ETX	EOT	ENQ	ACK	BEL	BS	HT	LF	VT	FF	CR	SO	SI
1x	DLE	DC1	DC2	DC3	DC4	NAK	SYN	ETB	CAN	EM	SUB	ESC	FS	GS	RS	US
2x	SP	¡	„	£	$	¥	†	§	ʹ	‘	“	«	♭	©	℗	®
3x	ʿ	ʾ	‚				‡	·	ʺ	’	”	»	♯	ʹ	ʺ	¿
4x	◌̉	◌̀	◌́	◌̂	◌̃	◌̄	◌̆	◌̇	◌̈	◌̈	◌̊	◌̕	◌̒	◌̋	◌̛	◌̌
5x	◌̧	◌̨	◌̡	◌̢	◌̥	◌̮	◌̣	◌̤	◌̲	◌̳	◌̩	◌̭		◌︠	◌︡	◌︣
6x		Æ	Đ				Ĳ		Ł	Ø	Œ		Þ			
7x		æ	đ	ð		ı	ĳ		ł	ø	œ	ß	þ			DEL

== ISO 5426-2 ==
ISO 5426-2 ("Latin characters used in minor European languages and obsolete typography") is a second part to ISO 5426, published in 1996. It specifies a set of 70 characters, some of which do not exist in Unicode. Michael Everson proposed the missing characters in Unicode 3.0, but some were postponed for further study. Later, new evidence was found, and more were encoded. P with belt is an error for P with flourish. P with middle tilde is an error for P with squirrel tail. The character at 0x42 will be encoded at U+1ACF in Unicode 17.0.

ISO 5426-2
	0	1	2	3	4	5	6	7	8	9	A	B	C	D	E	F
0x	NUL	SOH	STX	ETX	EOT	ENQ	ACK	BEL	BS	HT	LF	VT	FF	CR	SO	SI
1x	DLE	DC1	DC2	DC3	DC4	NAK	SYN	ETB	CAN	EM	SUB	ESC	FS	GS	RS	US
2x	SP	/ 002F	✶ 2736	¶ 00B6	☞ 261E	⁌ 204C	☙ 2619	δ 03B4		⁊ 204A	ꝯ A76F	ꝝ A75D	�	�	Ꝭ A76C	ꝰ A770
3x		´ 00B4	※ 203B	⁋ 204B	✠ 2720	⁍ 204D	❧ 2767	℺ 213A		⁊̴ 204A 0334	�	Ↄ 2183	ꝫ A76B	ꝭ A76D	ꝛ A75B	
4x	◌̓ 0313	◌ᷣ 1DE3	�	◌᪰ 1AB0	◌᷈ 1DC8	◌ͣ 0363	◌ͤ 0364	◌ͦ 0366	◌ᷦ 1DE6	◌̴ 0334	◌̵ 0335	◌̸ 0338	◌̷ 0337			
5x																
6x	Ʒ 01B7	Ǥ 01E4	Ħ 0126	Kʼ; 004B 02BC	Ŋ 014A	Ꝕ A754	Ꝓ A752	Ꝑ A750	Ꝗ A756	Ʀ 01A6	Ŧ 0166	Ƿ 01F7	Ȝ 021C	ꝙ A759	ſ 017F	
7x	ʒ 0292	ǥ 01E5	ħ 0127	ĸ 0138	ŋ 014B	ꝕ A755	ꝓ A753	ꝑ A751	ꝗ A757	ʀ 0280	ŧ 0167	ƿ 01BF	ȝ 021D	qꝫ 0071 A76B	�	DEL

� Not in Unicode
