= LY1 encoding =

8-bit TeX character encoding

LY1 (Y&Y 256 glyph encoding) is an 8-bit TeX encoding developed by Berthold Horn.

== Character set ==
LY1
	0	1	2	3	4	5	6	7	8	9	A	B	C	D	E	F
0x					/	˙	˝	˛		ﬂ			ﬁ			
1x	ı		`	´	ˇ	˘	ˉ	˚	¸	ß	æ	œ	ø	Æ	Œ	Ø
2x	SP	!	"	#	$	%	&	’	(	)	*	+	,	-	.	/
3x	0	1	2	3	4	5	6	7	8	9	:	;	<	=	>	?
4x	@	A	B	C	D	E	F	G	H	I	J	K	L	M	N	O
5x	P	Q	R	S	T	U	V	W	X	Y	Z	[	\	]	ˆ	_
6x	‘	a	b	c	d	e	f	g	h	i	j	k	l	m	n	o
7x	p	q	r	s	t	u	v	w	x	y	z	{	|	}	˜	¨
8x	Ł	'	‚	ƒ	„	…	†	‡	ˆ	‰	Š	‹	Œ	Ž		‒
9x	ł	‘	’	“	”	•	–	—	˜	™	š	›	œ	ž	~	Ÿ
Ax	NBSP	¡	¢	£	¤	¥	¦	§	¨	©	ª	«	¬	SHY	®	¯
Bx	°	±	²	³	´	µ	¶	·	¸	¹	º	»	¼	½	¾	¿
Cx	À	Á	Â	Ã	Ä	Å	Æ	Ç	È	É	Ê	Ë	Ì	Í	Î	Ï
Dx	Ð	Ñ	Ò	Ó	Ô	Õ	Ö	×	Ø	Ù	Ú	Û	Ü	Ý	Þ	ß
Ex	à	á	â	ã	ä	å	æ	ç	è	é	ê	ë	ì	í	î	ï
Fx	ð	ñ	ò	ó	ô	õ	ö	÷	ø	ù	ú	û	ü	ý	þ	ÿ
