= NeXT character set =

Character encoding used on NeXT workstations

NeXTSTEP Multinational
- Kermit: next-multinational
- Alias(es): WE8NEXTSTEP
- Created by: NeXT
- Extends: PostScript Standard Encoding
- Transforms / Encodes: ISO-8859-1 (Note: If the left single quotation mark and/or the modifier letter grave accent is unified with the backtick, the degree sign is unified with the high ring, and the soft hyphen is unified with the en dash. Not counting C1 control codes.)
- Other related encodings: ETS 300 706; ISO 5426; ISO 6937, ITU T.51; ITU T.61; ITU T.101

The NeXT character set (often aliased as NeXTSTEP encoding vector, WE8NEXTSTEP or next-multinational) was used by the NeXTSTEP and OPENSTEP operating systems on NeXT workstations beginning in 1988. It is based on Adobe Systems' PostScript (PS) character set aka Adobe Standard Encoding where unused code points were filled up with characters from ISO 8859-1 (Latin 1), although at differing code points.

== Character set ==
The following table shows the NeXT character set. Each character is shown with a potential Unicode equivalent. Codepoints 00_{hex} (0) to 7F_{hex} (127) are nearly identical to ASCII.

NeXT character set
	0	1	2	3	4	5	6	7	8	9	A	B	C	D	E	F
0x	NUL	SOH	STX	ETX	EOT	ENQ	ACK	BEL	BS	HT	LF	VT	FF	CR	SO	SI
1x	DLE	DC1	DC2	DC3	DC4	NAK	SYN	ETB	CAN	EM	SUB	ESC	FS	GS	RS	US
2x	SP	!	"	#	$	%	&	’	(	)	*	+	,	-	.	/
3x	0	1	2	3	4	5	6	7	8	9	:	;	<	=	>	?
4x	@	A	B	C	D	E	F	G	H	I	J	K	L	M	N	O
5x	P	Q	R	S	T	U	V	W	X	Y	Z	[	\	]		_
6x	‘	a	b	c	d	e	f	g	h	i	j	k	l	m	n	o
7x	p	q	r	s	t	u	v	w	x	y	z	{	|	}	~	DEL
8x	fsp	À	Á	Â	Ã	Ä	Å	Ç	È	É	Ê	Ë	Ì	Í	Î	Ï
9x	Ð	Ñ	Ò	Ó	Ô	Õ	Ö	Ù	Ú	Û	Ü	Ý	Þ	µ	×	÷
Ax	©	¡	¢	£	/	¥	ƒ	§	¤	'	“	«	‹	›	ﬁ	ﬂ
Bx	®	–	†	‡	·	¦	¶	•	‚	„	”	»	…	‰	¬	¿
Cx	¹	ˋ	´	ˆ	˜	¯	˘	˙	¨	²	˚	¸	³	˝	˛	ˇ
Dx	—	±	¼	½	¾	à	á	â	ã	ä	å	ç	è	é	ê	ë
Ex	ì	Æ	í	ª	î	ï	ð	ñ	Ł	Ø	Œ	º	ò	ó	ô	õ
Fx	ö	æ	ù	ú	û	ı	ü	ý	ł	ø	œ	ß	þ	ÿ		

Differences from Adobe Standard Encoding

== See also ==
- Display PostScript (DPS)
