= PostScript Standard Encoding =

Character sets used by Adobe Systems' PostScript

- Alias(es): Code page 1276
- Created by: Adobe
- Other related encodings: ETS 300 706; ISO 5426; ISO 6937, ITU T.51; ITU T.61; ITU T.101; NeXT Multinational

The PostScript Standard Encoding (often spelled StandardEncoding, aliased as PostScript) is one of the character sets (or encoding vectors) used by Adobe Systems' PostScript (PS) since 1984. In 1995, IBM assigned code page 1276 (CCSID 1276) to this character set. NeXT based the character set for its NeXTSTEP and OPENSTEP operating systems on this one.

== Character set ==
The following table shows the PostScript Standard Encoding. Each character is shown with a potential Unicode equivalent. Codepoints 00_{hex} (0) to 7F_{hex} (127) are nearly identical to ASCII. (The characters at positions 27_{hex} and 60_{hex} reflect an earlier interpretation of the visual appearance of those ASCII characters than the interpretation that was formalized in Unicode; see Quotation mark § Typewriters and early computers.) The upper half of the table contains punctuation and typographic characters, currency symbols, ligatured letters, a selection of modified base letters used in European languages, and a selection of diacritic marks to be used in composing accented letters.

PostScript Standard Encoding
	0	1	2	3	4	5	6	7	8	9	A	B	C	D	E	F
0x	NUL	SOH	STX	ETX	EOT	ENQ	ACK	BEL	BS	HT	LF	VT	FF	CR	SO	SI
1x	DLE	DC1	DC2	DC3	DC4	NAK	SYN	ETB	CAN	EM	SUB	ESC	FS	GS	RS	US
2x	SP	!	"	#	$	%	&	’	(	)	*	+	,	-	.	/
3x	0	1	2	3	4	5	6	7	8	9	:	;	<	=	>	?
4x	@	A	B	C	D	E	F	G	H	I	J	K	L	M	N	O
5x	P	Q	R	S	T	U	V	W	X	Y	Z	[	\	]		_
6x	‘	a	b	c	d	e	f	g	h	i	j	k	l	m	n	o
7x	p	q	r	s	t	u	v	w	x	y	z	{	|	}	~	DEL
8x																
9x																
Ax		¡	¢	£	∕	¥	ƒ	§	¤	'	“	«	‹	›	ﬁ	ﬂ
Bx		–	†	‡	·		¶	•	‚	„	”	»	…	‰		¿
Cx		ˋ	´	ˆ	˜	ˉ	˘	˙	¨		˚	¸		˝	˛	ˇ
Dx	—															
Ex		Æ		ª					Ł	Ø	Œ	º				
Fx		æ				ı			ł	ø	œ	ß				

== See also ==
- Display PostScript (DPS)
- NeXT character set
- PostScript fonts
