= N-apostrophe =

Digraph of the Latin alphabet

N-apostrophe (’n, a letter ⟨n⟩ preceded by an apostrophe) is a digraph used in Afrikaans, a language spoken in South Africa and Namibia.

== Grammar ==
The letter is the indefinite article of Afrikaans, and is pronounced as a schwa. The symbol itself came about as a contraction of its Dutch equivalent een meaning "one" (just as English an comes from Anglo-Saxon ān, also meaning "one").

Dit is ’n boom.
[dət əs ə buəm]
It is a tree.

In Afrikaans, ’n is never capitalised in standard texts. Instead, the first letter of the following word is capitalised.

’n Mens is hier.
A person is here.

An exception to this rule is in newspaper headlines, or sentences and phrases where all the letters are capitalised.

’N NASIONALE NOODTOESTAND
A NATIONAL EMERGENCY SITUATION

== In computer systems ==
The Unicode standard recommends that a sequence of an apostrophe followed by n (’n) be used to encode this diagraph. (Note: A precomposed character form was included in Unicode for legacy ISO/IEC 6937 and CP853 document compatibility, as U+0149 ŉ LATIN SMALL LETTER N PRECEDED BY APOSTROPHE, but its use is deprecated. The use of deprecated characters such as ŉ is "strongly discouraged". However it continues to be used in the Afrikaans versions of Facebook and other publications, probably to avoid the tendency of auto-correction software (designed for English quotation marks) to turn a typed 'n (straight apostrophe, n) into ‘n (left single quotation mark, n), which is incorrect but common (rather than the correct form, ’n). The code point has been removed from some computer fonts, such as Charis SIL and Doulos SIL. The upper case, or majuscule form has never been included in any international keyboards and is not encoded as a precomposed character.)

== See also ==
- Afrikaans
- Afrikaans grammar
- 't (apostrophe t), a similar digraph in Dutch
- U+2019 ’ RIGHT SINGLE QUOTATION MARK, the "punctuation apostrophe" to be used in this case (the glyph has two meanings).
- Apostrophe § Smart quotes, the tendency of word processing software to misinterpret an opening apostrophe as an opening (left) quote
