= Signature mark =

Mark identifying a section in bookbinding

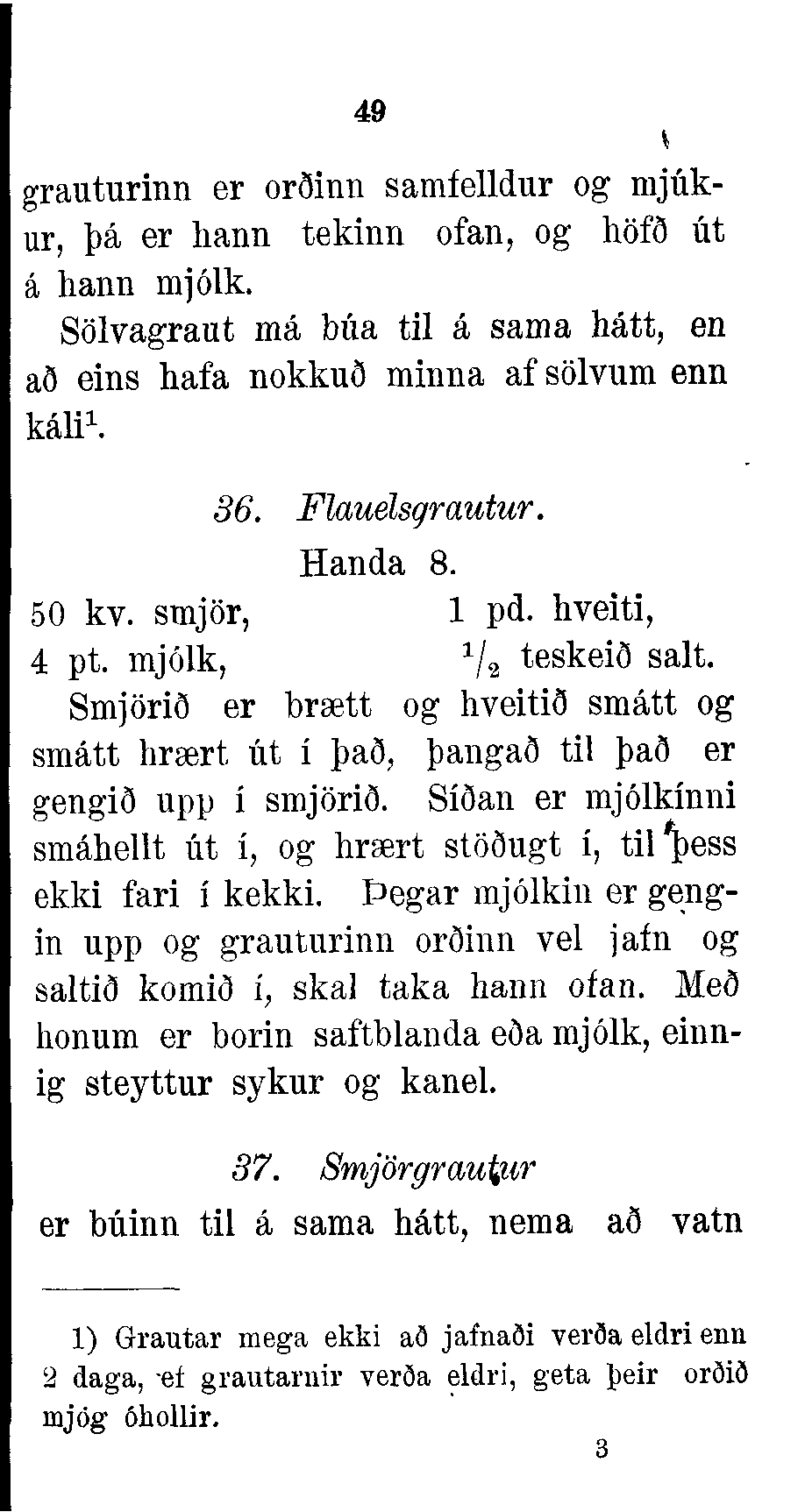
At the bottom of page 49, the signature mark "3" represents the number of the gathering.

A signature mark, in traditional bookbinding, is a letter, number or combination of either or both, which is printed at the bottom of the first page, or leaf, of a section.

The section is itself referred to as a signature, also called collation or gathering.

The aim is to ensure that the binder can order the pages and sections in the correct order. Often the letters of the Latin alphabet were used.

The practice has been superseded by advances in printing and bookbinding technology. As a result, signature marks are rarely found in modern books.

== Contemporary use of signature marks ==
A number of symbols traditionally used as binding signature marks were encoded in ISO 5426-2 and from there (to enable migration of data from the old standard) were transposed into Unicode.

- 0x32 REFERENCE MARK was re-encoded with U+203B ※ REFERENCE MARK
- 0x34 MALTESE CROSS, with U+2720 ✠ MALTESE CROSS (&malt;, &maltese;)
- 0x36 RIGHTWARDS LEAF ARROW, with U+2767 ❧ ROTATED FLORAL HEART BULLET (also known as "hedera" and "ivy leaf")
- 0x37 LATIN CAPITAL LETTER SIDEWAYS Q, with U+213A ℺ ROTATED CAPITAL Q

U+2619 ☙ REVERSED ROTATED FLORAL HEART BULLET was added later. These latter two are the only codepoints in Unicode 4.0 to bear the annotation "binding signature mark".

== See also ==
- Fleuron (typography) – Typographical ornament (class of symbols that includes the floral heart bullets mentioned above.
- Signature – Mark made as a proof of identity and intent
