= ITU T.61 =

ITU-T Recommendation

T.61
- Character repertoire and coded character sets for the international teletex service
- Status: Withdrawn
- Year started: 1980
- Latest version: (03/93); March 1993
- Organization: ITU-T
- Committee: Study Group VIII
- Related standards: T.51, ASN.1, X.500, X.509
- Domain: encoding
- License: Freely available
- Website: https://www.itu.int/rec/T-REC-T.61

T.61 is an ITU-T Recommendation for a Teletex character set. T.61 predated Unicode, and was the primary character set in ASN.1 used in early versions of X.500 and X.509 for encoding strings containing characters used in Western European languages. It is also used by older versions of LDAP. While T.61 continues to be supported in modern versions of X.500 and X.509, it has been deprecated in favor of Unicode. It is also called Code page 1036, CP1036, or IBM 01036.

While ASN.1 does see wide use and the T.61 character set is used on some standards using ASN.1 (for example in RSA Security's PKCS #9), the 1988-11 version of the T.61 standard itself was superseded by a never-published 1993-03 version; the 1993-03 version was withdrawn by the ITU-T. The 1988-11 version is still available.

T.61 was one of the encodings supported by Mozilla software in email and HTML until 2014, when the supported encodings were limited to those in the WHATWG Encoding Standard (although T.61 remained supported for LDAP).

== Code page layout ==
T.61
- Alias(es): Code page 1036; Code page 20261; ISO-IR-103
- Standard: ITU T.61
- Other related encoding(s): ETS 300 706; ISO 5426; ISO 6937, ITU T.51; NeXT Multinational; PostScript Standard Encoding; ITU T.101

The following table maps the T.61 characters to their equivalent Unicode code points.

T.61-8bit
	0	1	2	3	4	5	6	7	8	9	A	B	C	D	E	F
0x									BS		LF		FF	CR	LS1	LS0
1x										SS2 (Note: The ISO/IEC 2022 C0 control set defined by T.61 (ISO-IR-106) encodes SS2 and SS3 at 0x19 and 0x1D respectively. It is permitted to use ISO/IEC 2022 sequences for switching control sets (as opposed to graphical sets) within ISO/IEC 10646 (UCS/Unicode) in contexts where processing ANSI escape codes is appropriate, provided that each byte in the sequence is padded to the code unit size of the encoding, in which case SS2 and SS3 would be available at U+0019 and U+001D. However, the more common ISO/IEC 6429 control set, the names of which are listed for reference in the Unicode code chart, encodes SS2 and SS3 at U+008E and U+008F respectively.)	SUB	ESC		SS3		
2x	SP	!	"			%	&	'	(	)	*	+	,	-	.	/
3x	0	1	2	3	4	5	6	7	8	9	:	;	<	=	>	?
4x	@	A	B	C	D	E	F	G	H	I	J	K	L	M	N	O
5x	P	Q	R	S	T	U	V	W	X	Y	Z	[		]		_
6x		a	b	c	d	e	f	g	h	i	j	k	l	m	n	o
7x	p	q	r	s	t	u	v	w	x	y	z		|			DEL
8x												PLD	PLU			
9x												CSI				
Ax	NBSP	¡	¢	£	$	¥	#	§	¤			«				
Bx	°	±	²	³	×	µ	¶	·	÷			»	¼	½	¾	¿
Cx		◌̀	◌́	◌̂	◌̃	◌̄	◌̆	◌̇	◌̈	◌̈ (Note: Noted in the 1988 revision of the specification as having been allocated to the umlaut in the 1980 revision of the specification, but having since been deprecated. It was initially used to distinguish between umlaut and diaeresis.)	◌̊	◌̧	◌̲	◌̋	◌̨	◌̌
Dx																
Ex	Ω	Æ	Ð	ª	Ħ		Ĳ	Ŀ	Ł	Ø	Œ	º	Þ	Ŧ	Ŋ	ŉ
Fx	ĸ	æ	đ	ð	ħ	ı	ĳ	ŀ	ł	ø	œ	ß	þ	ŧ	ŋ	

See ITU T.51 for a description of how the accents at 0xC0..CF worked. They prefix the letters, as opposed to postfix used by Unicode.

== See also ==
- ITU T.51
