= Dotless J =

Letter of the Latin alphabet

Uppercase ⟨J⟩ on the left; dotless lowercase ⟨ȷ⟩ on the right.

ȷ is a modified letter of the Latin alphabet, obtained by writing the lowercase letter j without a dot.

Dotless j was formerly used in Karelian to mark palatalisation. It is also found in the Swedish Dialect Alphabet, in an Adyghe orthography from 1922, a transcription of Khakas by Vasily Radlov and in the Basque orthography of Sabino Arana.

== Encoding ==
Character information
Preview	ȷ	
Unicode name	LATIN SMALL LETTER DOTLESS J	
Encodings	decimal	hex
Unicode	567	U+0237
UTF-8	200 183	C8 B7
Numeric character reference	&#567;	&#x237;
Named character reference	&jmath;	

== See also ==
- Dotless I
- J
- ɟ (dotless j with stroke, an IPA letter representing the voiced palatal stop)
