= Kra (letter) =

Letter used in an Inuktitut dialect

- Κʼ ĸ

Usage
- Type: alphabetic
- Language of origin: Inuttitut
- Sound values: [q]
- In Unicode: U+0138

History
- Transliterations: Q q

Kra (uppercase: Kʼ, lowercase: ĸ) is a glyph formerly used to write Greenlandic, and which is now only found in Inuttitut, a dialect of Inuktitut. It is visually similar to a Latin small capital letter ᴋ, a Greek letter κ (kappa), or a Cyrillic small letter к (ka).

It is used to denote the sound written as [q] in the International Phonetic Alphabet (the voiceless uvular plosive). For collation purposes, it is therefore considered to be a type of ⟨q⟩, rather than a type of ⟨k⟩, and should sort near ⟨q⟩.

Its Unicode code point for the lowercase form is U+0138 ĸ LATIN SMALL LETTER KRA (&kgreen;). If this is unavailable, ⟨q⟩ is substituted. The letter can be capitalized as ⟨Κʼ⟩, but it is not encoded separately as a single letter because it is very similar to the Latin capital letter ⟨K⟩ followed by an apostrophe, preferably the modifier letter apostrophe, U+02BC ʼ MODIFIER LETTER APOSTROPHE. However, this case mapping is not implemented in Unicode.

In 1973, a spelling reform replaced kra in Greenlandic with the more standard Latin letter ⟨Q, q⟩.

== Gallery ==
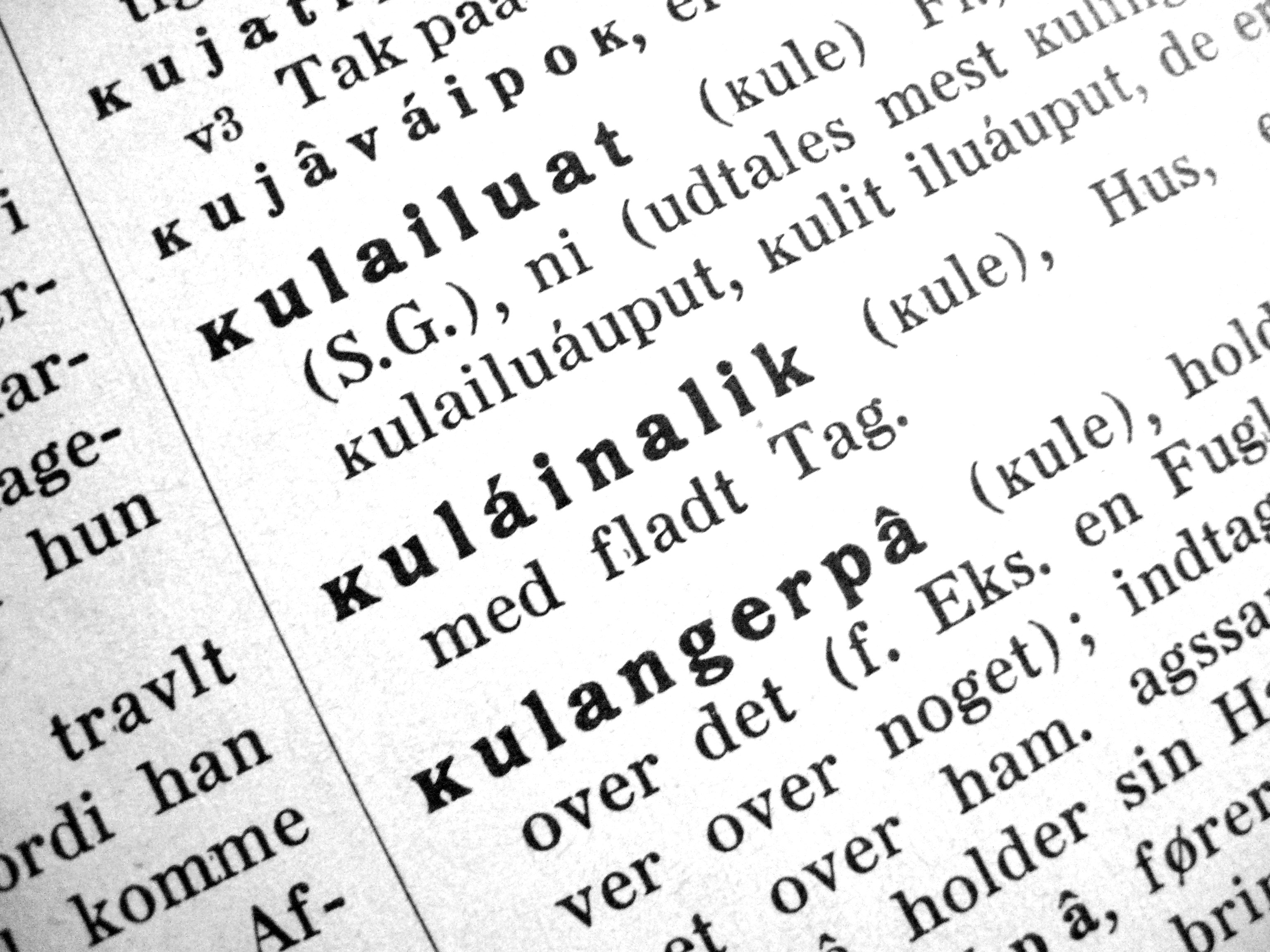
⟨ĸ⟩ in a Greenlandic–Danish dictionary from 1926

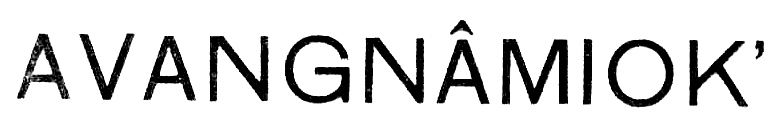
"Avangnâmioĸ" in all-caps, title of Greenlandic periodical from 1957, with the uppercase of ĸ as Kʼ.

Kra, small caps K (if present), and Cyrillic small к, using the fonts: Arial, Times New Roman, Doulos SIL, Cambria, Linux Libertine, Andron Mega Corpus, Adobe Minion Pro, Courier New, and Consolas. Second row: italics, using the same fonts.
