= Ò =

Latin letter O with grave accent

Latin letter O with grave

Ò, ò (o-grave) is a letter of the Latin script.

It is used in Catalan, Emilian, Lombard, Papiamento, Occitan, Kashubian, Romagnol, Sardinian, Scottish Gaelic, Taos, Vietnamese, Haitian Creole, Louisiana Creole, Norwegian, Welsh and Italian.

== Usage in various languages ==
=== Chinese ===
In Chinese pinyin, ò is the yángqù tone (阳去, falling tone) of "o".

=== Emilian ===
Ò is used to represent Emilian pronunciation: [ɔː], e.g. òs Emilian pronunciation: [ɔːs] "bone".

=== Italian ===
In Italian, the grave accent is used over any vowel to indicate word-final stress: Niccolò (equivalent of Nicholas and the forename of Machiavelli).

It can also be used on the nonfinal vowels o and e to indicate that the vowel is stressed and that it is open: còrso, "Corsican", vs. córso, "course"/"run", the past participle of "correre". Ò represents the open-mid back rounded vowel /ɔ/ and È represents the open-mid front unrounded vowel /ɛ/.

=== Kashubian ===
Ò is the 28th letter of the Kashubian alphabet and represents /wɛ/, like the pronunciation of ⟨we⟩ in "wet".

=== Lombard ===
It is used to represent vocalic phonemes /ɔ/ and /ɔː/ in every tonic occurrence to distinguish them from /o/ and /oː/ represented by O, e.g. fiòrd /ˈfjɔːrd/ (fjord) and sord /ˈsuːrd/ (deaf); còta /ˈkɔta/ (cooked) and sota /ˈsota/ (under/below).

=== Louisiana Creole ===
It is used to represent /ɔ/ by many (but not all) speakers to distinguish it from /o/, represented by o.

=== Macedonian ===
In Macedonian, о̀̀ is used to differentiate the word о̀̀д (English: walk) from the more common од (English: from). Both о̀̀ and о are pronounced as [o].

=== Norwegian ===
Ò can be found in the Norwegian word òg which is an alternative spelling of også, meaning "also". This word is found in both Nynorsk and Bokmål.

=== Romagnol ===
Ò is used to represent Romagnol pronunciation: [ɔ], e.g. piò Romagnol pronunciation: [pjɔ] "more".

=== Vietnamese ===
In the Vietnamese alphabet, ò is the huyền tone (falling tone) of "o".

=== Welsh ===
In Welsh, ò is sometimes used, usually in words borrowed from another language, to mark vowels that are short when a long vowel would normally be expected, e.g., clòs (English: close [of the weather]).

== Character mappings ==
Character information
Preview	Ò		ò	
Unicode name	LATIN CAPITAL LETTER O WITH GRAVE		LATIN SMALL LETTER O WITH GRAVE	
Encodings	decimal	hex	dec	hex
Unicode	210	U+00D2	242	U+00F2
UTF-8	195 146	C3 92	195 178	C3 B2
Numeric character reference	&#210;	&#xD2;	&#242;	&#xF2;
Named character reference	&Ograve;		&ograve;	
