= Right single quotation mark =

Grapheme used as an apostrophe or a quotation mark

’o

Right single quotation mark
- U+2019 ’ RIGHT SINGLE QUOTATION MARK (&CloseCurlyQuote;, &rsquo;, &rsquor;)

The character ’ (U+2019 ’ RIGHT SINGLE QUOTATION MARK) is used for both a typographic apostrophe and a single right (closing) quotation mark. The fact that they share a single (Unicode) codepoint is because many computer fonts and character sets (such as CP1252) had previously unified the characters into a single codepoint, and the difficulty of software (at the time) being able to distinguish which character is intended by a user's typing.

The straight apostrophe ' (the "ASCII apostrophe", U+0027 ' APOSTROPHE) is even more ambiguous, as it could also be intended as a left or right quotation mark, or a prime symbol.

== See also ==
- Modifier letter apostrophe
- General Punctuation (Unicode block)
