= Ł =

Letter of the Latin alphabet

L with stroke
- Ł ł

Usage
- Writing system: Latin
- Type: alphabetic
- Language of origin: Chipewyan, Chukchi, Iñupiaq, Kashubian, Kwakʼwala, Latvian, Lower Sorbian, Navajo, Northern Khanty, Okanagan, Old English, Polish, Silesian, Tlingit, Upper Sorbian, Venetan
- Sound values: [w]; [ɫ]; [ɬ]
- In Unicode: U+0141, U+0142

History
Development
U20
  S39
          - Λ λ
            - 𐌋
              - L l
                - Ł ł
- Transliterations: w

Other
- Writing direction: Left to right

Ł (minuscule: ł), known as L with stroke, is a Latin-script letter. It is used in the Polish, Kashubian, Sorbian, Silesian, Belarusian Latin, Ukrainian Latin, Kurdish (some dialects), Wymysorys, Navajo, Dëne Sųłıné, Iñupiaq, Zuni, Hupa, Sm'algya̱x, Nisgaʼa, and Dogrib alphabets, several proposed alphabets for the Venetian language, and the ISO 11940 romanization of the Thai script. In some Slavic languages, it represents the continuation of the Proto-Slavic non-palatal ⟨L⟩ (dark L), which evolved further into /w/ in Polish, Kashubian, Sorbian, and Silesian. In most non-European languages, it represents a voiceless alveolar lateral fricative or similar sound.

== Glyph shape Ł ==
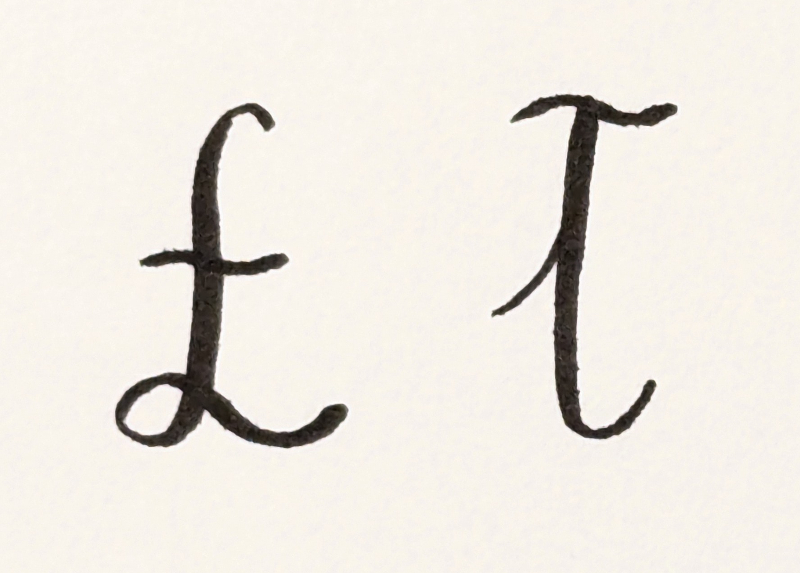
Handwritten uppercase and lowercase Ł in Polish

In normal typefaces, the letter has a stroke approximately in the middle of the vertical stem, crossing it at an angle between 70° and 45°, never horizontally. In cursive handwriting and typefaces that imitate it, the capital letter has a horizontal stroke through the middle and looks very similar to the pound sign £. In the cursive lowercase letter, the stroke is also horizontal and placed on top of the letter instead of going through the middle of the stem, which would not be distinguishable from the letter t. The stroke is either straight or slightly wavy, depending on the style. Unlike ⟨l⟩, the letter ⟨ł⟩ is usually written without a noticeable loop at the top. Most publicly available multilingual cursive typefaces, including commercial ones, feature an incorrect glyph for ⟨ł⟩.

A rare variant glyph of the ⟨ł⟩ grapheme is a cursive double-ł ligature, used in words such as Jagiełło, Radziwiłł or Ałłach (archaic: Allah), where the strokes at the top of the letters are joined into a single stroke.

== Polish Ł ==
In Polish, ⟨Ł⟩ is used to distinguish the historical dark (velarized) L [ɫ] from clear L [l]. The Polish ⟨Ł⟩ now sounds the same as the English ⟨w⟩, [w] as in water (except for older speakers in some eastern Polish dialects where it is still lateral). The name of this diacritic is kreska, which is shared with the five letters with acute accents.

In 1440, Jakub Parkoszowic proposed a letter resembling ⟨ℓ⟩ to represent clear L. For dark L he suggested L with a stroke running in the opposite direction to the modern version. The latter was introduced in 1514–1515 by Stanisław Zaborowski in his Orthographia seu modus recte scribendi et legendi Polonicum idioma quam utilissimus. L with stroke originally represented a velarized alveolar lateral approximant [ɫ], a pronunciation that is preserved in the eastern part of Poland and among the Polish minority in Lithuania, Belarus, and Ukraine. This pronunciation is similar to Russian unpalatalised ⟨л⟩ in native words and grammar forms.

In modern Polish, Ł is usually pronounced [w] (as ⟨w⟩ in English wet). This pronunciation first appeared among Polish lower classes in the 16th century. It was considered an uncultured accent by the upper classes (who pronounced ⟨Ł⟩ as [ɫ]) until the mid-20th century, when this distinction gradually began to fade.

The shift from [ɫ] to [w] in Polish has affected all instances of dark L, even word-initially or intervocalically, e.g. ładny ('pretty, nice') is pronounced [ˈwadnɨ], słowo ('word') is [ˈswɔvɔ], and ciało ('body') is [ˈtɕawɔ]. Ł often alternates with clear L, such as the plural forms of adjectives and verbs in the past tense that are associated with masculine personal nouns, e.g. mały → mali ([ˈmawɨ] → [ˈmali]). Alternation is also common in declension of nouns, e.g. from nominative to locative, tło → na tle ([twɔ] → [naˈtlɛ]).

Polish final Ł also often corresponds to Ukrainian word-final ⟨в⟩ Ve and Belarusian ⟨ў⟩ short U. Thus, "he gave" is dał in Polish, дав in Ukrainian, даў in Belarusian (all pronounced [daw]), but дал [daɫ] in Russian.

=== Examples ===
==== Notable figures (Note: The IPA transcription is rendered according to modern Polish pronunciation (used since mid 20th century), based on the Warsaw dialect. Names of persons living before the period mentioned have been pronounced with [ɫ] instead of [w] in the times when those people lived, and they themselves are also very likely to have pronounced their names with the first sound, [ɫ].): ====
- Michał Kwiatkowski, a Polish cyclist and former world champion.
- Stanisław Lem (IPA: [staˈɲiswaf ˈlɛm]), Polish writer of science fiction, philosophy, and satire, and a trained physician
- Witold Lutosławski, Polish composer
- Ignacy Łukasiewicz (IPA: [iɡˈnat͡sɨ wukaˈɕɛvit͡ʂ]), the inventor of the modern paraffin lamp
- Jan Łukasiewicz (IPA: [ˈjan wukaˈɕɛvit͡ʂ]), the inventor of Polish notation
- Stanisław August Poniatowski, last monarch of the Polish–Lithuanian Commonwealth
- Kazimierz Pułaski (IPA: [kaˈʑimjɛʂ puˈwaskʲi]), known in English as Casimir Pulaski, a Polish soldier and commander, a brigadier general in the Continental Army cavalry during American Revolutionary War
- Wacław Sierpiński (IPA: [ˈvat͡swaf ɕɛrˈpʲij̃skʲi]), Polish mathematician
- Maria Skłodowska-Curie (Polish: [skwɔˈdɔfska kʲiˈri]), a scientist awarded the Nobel prize in both physics and chemistry, who conducted pioneering research on radioactivity.
- Wisława Szymborska (IPA: [viˈswava ʂɨmˈbɔrska]), a Polish poet and recipient of the 1996 Nobel Prize in Literature
- Lech Wałęsa (IPA: [ˈlɛɣ vaˈwɛ̃sa]), Polish labor leader and former president
- Karol Józef Wojtyła (IPA: [ˈkarɔl ˈjuzɛv vɔjˈtɨwa]), John Paul II, Pope of the Catholic Church from 1978 to 2005

==== Selected proper names with ⟨ł⟩: ====
- Łódź (Polish city) / łódź (boat)
- Łukasz (Lucas)
- Władysław
- Wisła
- Michał (Michael)
- Złoty (Polish currency) / złoty (golden — having the colour of gold; made of gold)

=== Alternative glyphs ===
==== Foreign languages ====
In contexts where ⟨Ł⟩ is not readily available as a glyph, basic ⟨L⟩ is used instead. Thus, the surname Małecki would be spelled Malecki in a foreign country.

==== Keyboard-based input machines & digital devices ====
In the 1980s, when some computers available in Poland lacked Polish diacritics, it was common practice to use a pound sterling sign (£) for ⟨Ł⟩. This practice ceased after DOS-based and Mac computers came with a code page for such characters.

== Other languages ==
In Belarusian Łacinka (both in the 1929 and 1962 versions), ⟨Ł⟩ corresponds to Cyrillic ⟨Л⟩ (El), and is normally pronounced /ɫ/ (almost exactly as in English pull).

In the North American languages Navajo, Elaponke, and Iñupiaq, ⟨Ł⟩ is used for a voiceless alveolar lateral fricative /ɬ/, like the Welsh double L.

⟨Ł⟩ is used in the orthographic transcription of Ahtna, an Athabaskan language spoken in Alaska; it represents a breathy lateral fricative. It is also used in Tanacross, a related Athabaskan language.

When transcribing Armenian into the Latin alphabet, ⟨Ł⟩ may be used to write the letter ⟨Ղ⟩ /ʁ/, for example ⟨Ղուկաս⟩ → ⟨Łukas⟩. In Classical Armenian, ⟨Ղ⟩ was pronounced as [ɫ], which morphed into /ʁ/ in both standard varieties of modern Armenian. Other transcriptions of ⟨Ղ⟩ include ⟨Ṙ⟩, ⟨Ġ⟩ or ⟨Gh⟩.

== Computer usage ==
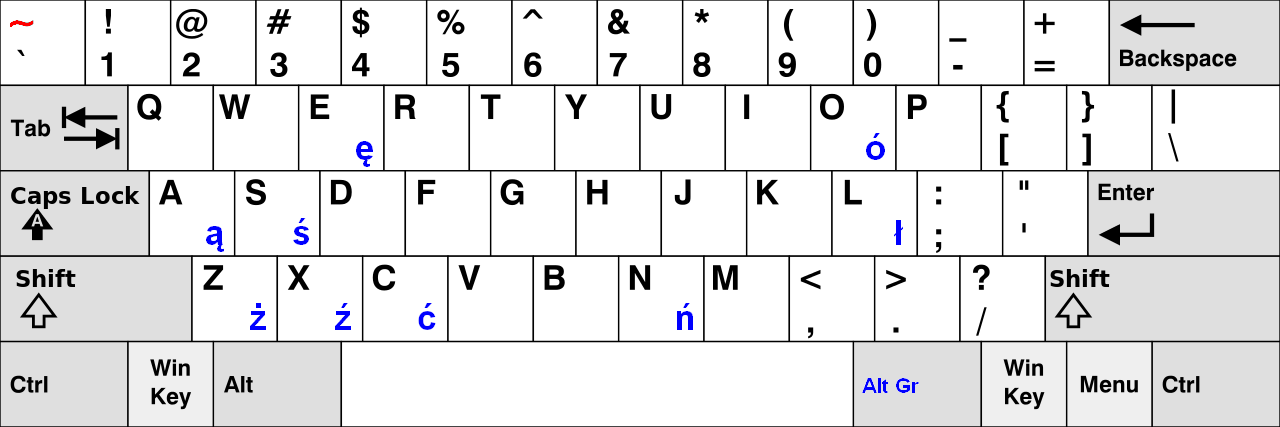
The most common keyboard layout used in Poland

The letter is encoded in Unicode with the codepoints

- U+0141 Ł LATIN CAPITAL LETTER L WITH STROKE
- U+0142 ł LATIN SMALL LETTER L WITH STROKE

These symbols are included as standard using the keyboard mapping commonly used in Poland. (For entry on other systems, see Unicode input.)

== See also ==
- Ў, ў – short U (Belarusian Cyrillic)
- £ – pound sign
- In Venetian, a similar glyph ⟨Ƚ⟩, ⟨ƚ⟩ (L with bar, a horizontal bar) is used as substitution for L in many words in which the pronunciation of "L" has changed for some dialects, i.e. by becoming voiceless or becoming the sound of the shorter vowel corresponding to /ɰ/ or /ɛ/.
- U+0197 Ɨ LATIN CAPITAL LETTER I WITH STROKE
