= Ø =

Letter in several Latin-script alphabets

O with slash
- Ø ø
- Öö, Ǿǿ, Ø̈ø̈

Usage
- Writing system: Latin script
- Type: Alphabet
- Language of origin: Contested
- Sound values: [ø]; [œ]; [ʏ]; [yo]; [oe]
- In Unicode: U+00D8, U+00F8

History
Development
D4
      - Ο ο
        - 𐌏
          - O o
            - Ø ø
- Transliterations: OE oe, Öö, O/ o/
- Variations: Öö, Ǿǿ, Ø̈ø̈

Other
- Associated graphs: I, E

Ø (minuscule: ø), known as O with slash, is a Latin-script letter. It is used by the Danish, Norwegian, Faroese, and Southern Sámi languages. It is mostly used to represent the mid front rounded vowels, such as [ø] and [œ].

The name of this letter is the same as the sound it represents (see usage). Among English-speaking typographers the symbol may be called a "slashed O" or "o with stroke". Although these names suggest it is a ligature or a diacritical variant of the letter ⟨o⟩, it is informally known as the "Runic O" or "Nordic O", it is considered a separate letter in Danish and Norwegian, and it is alphabetized after ⟨z⟩ — thus ⟨x⟩, ⟨y⟩, ⟨z⟩, ⟨æ⟩, ⟨ø⟩, and ⟨å⟩.

In other languages that do not have the letter as part of the regular alphabet, or in limited character sets such as ASCII, ⟨ø⟩ may correctly be replaced with the digraph ⟨oe⟩, although in practice it is often replaced with just ⟨o⟩, e.g. in email addresses. It is equivalent to ⟨ö⟩ used in Swedish (and a number of other languages), and may also be replaced with ⟨ö⟩, as was often the case with older typewriters in Denmark and Norway, and in national extensions of International Morse Code.

⟨ø⟩ (minuscule) is also used in the International Phonetic Alphabet to represent a close-mid front rounded vowel.

== Language usage ==
=== Languages in Scandinavia ===
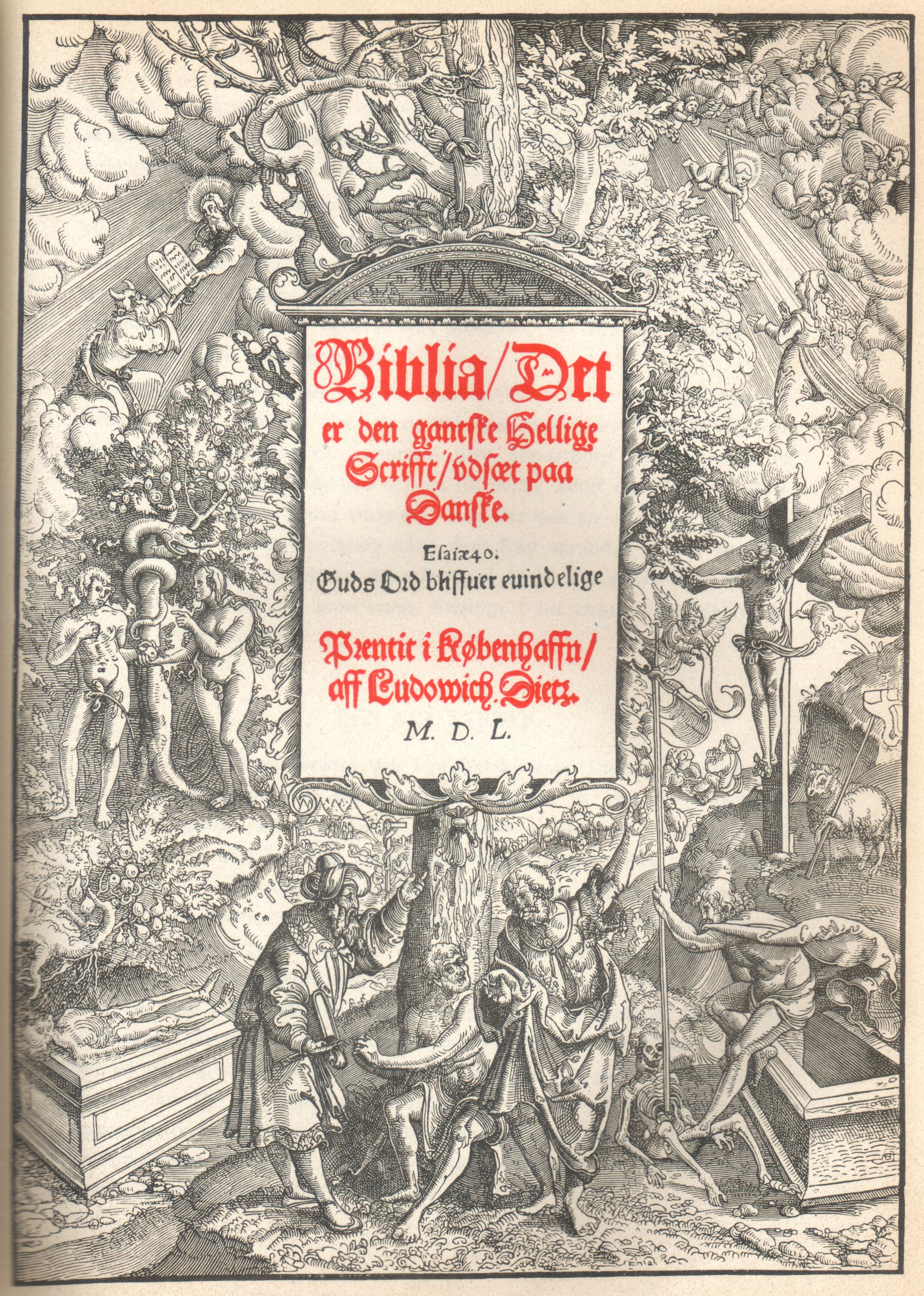
Title page of the Christian III Bible, employing the spelling "Københaffn"

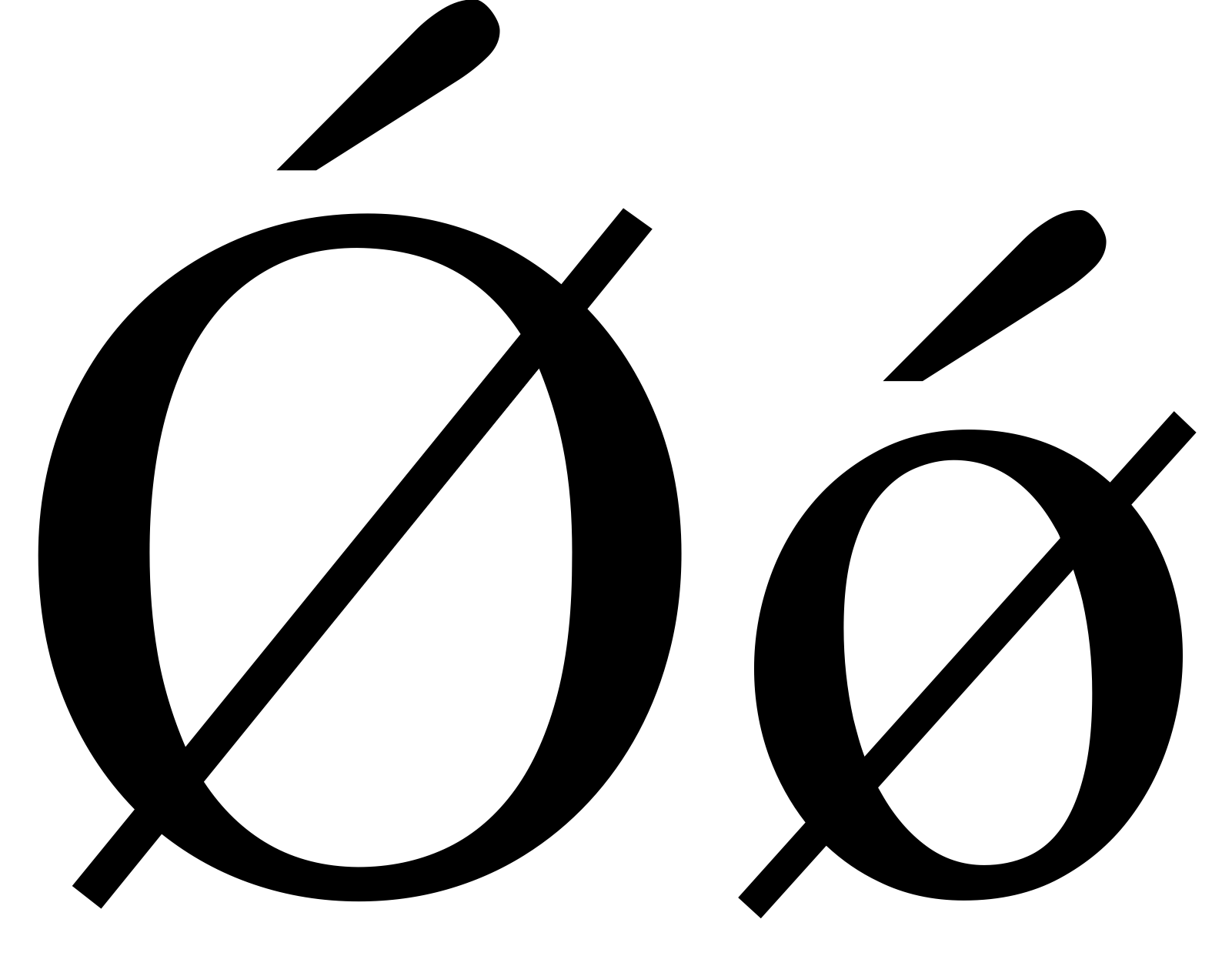
O with Stroke and acute in Doulos SIL

- In modern Danish, Faroese, and Norwegian, the letter generally represents close-mid front rounded vowel, the IPA symbol for which is [ø] (Unicode U+00F8). As with so many vowels, it has slight variations in quality. Besides the close-mid vowel, as in Danish søster ("sister") pronounced [ø], like the ⟨eu⟩ in the French word bleu), ⟨ø⟩ may have a lower vowel quality, e.g. in Danish bønne ("bean") pronounced [œ], like the ⟨œu⟩ in the French word bœuf). The letter was used in both Antiqua and Fraktur from at least as early as the Christian III Bible. Under German influence, the letter ö appeared in older texts (particularly those using Fraktur) and was preferred for use on maps (e.g., for Helsingör or Læsö) until 1957.
- The Southern Sami language uses the letter ⟨ø⟩ in Norway. It is used in the diphthongs ⟨yø⟩ [yo] and ⟨øø⟩ [oe]. In Sweden, the letter ⟨ö⟩ is preferred.
- Ǿ (Ø with an acute accent, Unicode U+01FE/F) may be used in Danish on rare occasions to distinguish its use from a similar word with Ø. Example: hunden gǿr, "the dog barks" against hunden gør (det), "the dog does (it)". This distinction is not mandatory and the first example can be written either gǿr or gør; the first variant (with ǿ) would only be used to avoid confusion. The second example cannot be spelled gǿr. In Danish, hunden gør, "the dog barks", may sometimes be replaced by the non-standard spelling hunden gøer. This is, however, usually based on a misunderstanding of the grammatic rules of conjugation of verbs ending in the letters ø and å. These idiosyncratic spellings are not accepted in the official language standard. On Danish keyboards and typewriters, the acute accent may be typed above any vowel, by pressing the acute key before pressing the letter, but Ǿ is not implemented in the Microsoft Windows keyboard layout for Danish.
- Ø is used in Old Icelandic texts, when written with the standardized orthography, denoting, among other things the umlauts o > ø and ǫ > ø.

=== Other languages ===
- The Iaai language uses the letter ⟨ø⟩ to represent the sound [ø].
- ⟨Ø⟩ is used in the orthographies of several languages of Africa, such as Lendu, spoken in the Democratic Republic of the Congo, and Koonzime, spoken in Cameroon.
- ⟨Ø⟩ is used in some alphabets for the indigenous Mexican Tlahuica language (also known as Pjyɇkakjo or Ocuiltec), where it represents the open-mid back unrounded vowel [ʌ].
- Ø (or more properly, the similar null sign, ∅), is used in English as a short for "no" or "none", but this usage is discouraged in handwriting, since it may be mistaken as another number, especially "0".
- ø is used in the Tibeto-Burman Rawang language.
- Ø represents the open-mid back rounded vowel [ɔ] in the Mazahua language.

== Similar letters ==
- Ø / ø is not related to, and should not be confused with the Greek Phi (Φ, φ). However this was often done, especially on the original IBM PC where the character set only contained the lowercase Greek letter.
- It should not be confused with the Cyrillic Ef (Ф, ф) or Early Cyrillic Fita (Ѳ).
- The Cyrillic Oe (Ө) has the same sound as Ø, which is used in the Cyrillic alphabets for Kazakh, Mongolian, Azerbaijani, and other languages that have this sound.
- The Turkish, Azerbaijani, Turkmen, Tatar, Swedish, Icelandic, Rotuman, German, Hungarian, Finnish, and Estonian alphabets use the letter Ö instead of Ø. Hungarian also uses Ő for the same sound lengthened. The letter Ø-with-diæresis (Ø̈, ø̈) sometimes appears on packaging meant for the Scandinavian market so as to prevent printing the same word twice. For example, liquorice brand Snøre/Snöre's logo on the packaging is Snø̈re. The letter is rarely used on maps (e.g.: Malmø̈).
- Ø-with-diæresis was also used by the Ø̈resund bridge company, as part of their logotype, to symbolize its union between Sweden and Denmark. Since Ø-with-diæresis did not exist in computer fonts, it was not used in the text. The logotype now uses the spelling Øresundsbron, with Øresunds- being Danish and -bron being Swedish.
- In Old Polish texts, the letter Ꟁ / ꟁ, called "o rogate" (eng. "horned o"), represented a nasal vowel (after all nasal vowels had merged, but before they re-diverged in modern Polish). Due to limitations in printing technology, this letter has sometimes been rendered as ø, φ, or ϕ.

== Similar symbols ==
- The letter "Ø" is sometimes used in mathematics as a replacement for the symbol "∅" (Unicode character U+2205), referring to the empty set as established by Bourbaki, and sometimes in linguistics as a replacement for same symbol used to represent a zero. The "∅" symbol is always drawn as a slashed circle, whereas in most typefaces the letter "Ø" is a slashed ellipse.
- The diameter symbol (⌀) (Unicode character U+2300) is similar to the lowercase letter ø, and in some typefaces it even uses the same glyph, although in many others the glyphs are subtly distinguishable (normally, the diameter symbol uses an exact circle and the letter o is somewhat stylized). The diameter symbol is used extensively in engineering drawings, and it is also seen in situations where abbreviating "diameter" is useful, such as on camera lenses. For example, a lens with a diameter of 82 millimeters would be engraved with " ⌀ 82 mm ".
- Ø or ⌀ is sometimes also used as a symbol for average value, particularly in German-speaking countries. ("Average" in German is Durchschnitt, directly translated as cut-through.)
- Slashed zero is an alternate glyph for the zero character. Its slash does not extend outside the ellipse (except in handwriting). It is often used to distinguish "zero" ("0") from the Latin script letter "O" anywhere that people wish to preempt confounding of the two, particularly in encoding systems, scientific and engineering applications, computer programming (such as software development), and telecommunications. It is also used in Amateur Radio call signs, such as XXØXX, XØXXX, and so on, in the United States and in other countries. See, also, for information on international amateur radio call signs.
- The letter "Ø" is often used in trapped-key interlock sequence drawings to denote a key trapped in a lock. A lock without a key is shown as an "O".
- The letter "Ø" is also used in written music, especially jazz, to type an ad-hoc chord symbol for a half-diminished chord, as in "Cø". The typographically correct chord symbol is spelled with the root name, followed by a slashed degree symbol, as in "C𝆩". The slashed degree symbol is found in the musical symbols block of Unicode but is unsupported by some fonts.

== History ==
The letter arose as a version of the ligature ⟨oe⟩. In Danish manuscripts from the 12th and 13th century, the letter used to represent an /ø/ sound is most frequently written as an ⟨o⟩ with a line through, but also ⟨oe⟩. The line could both be horizontal or vertical.

== Unicode ==
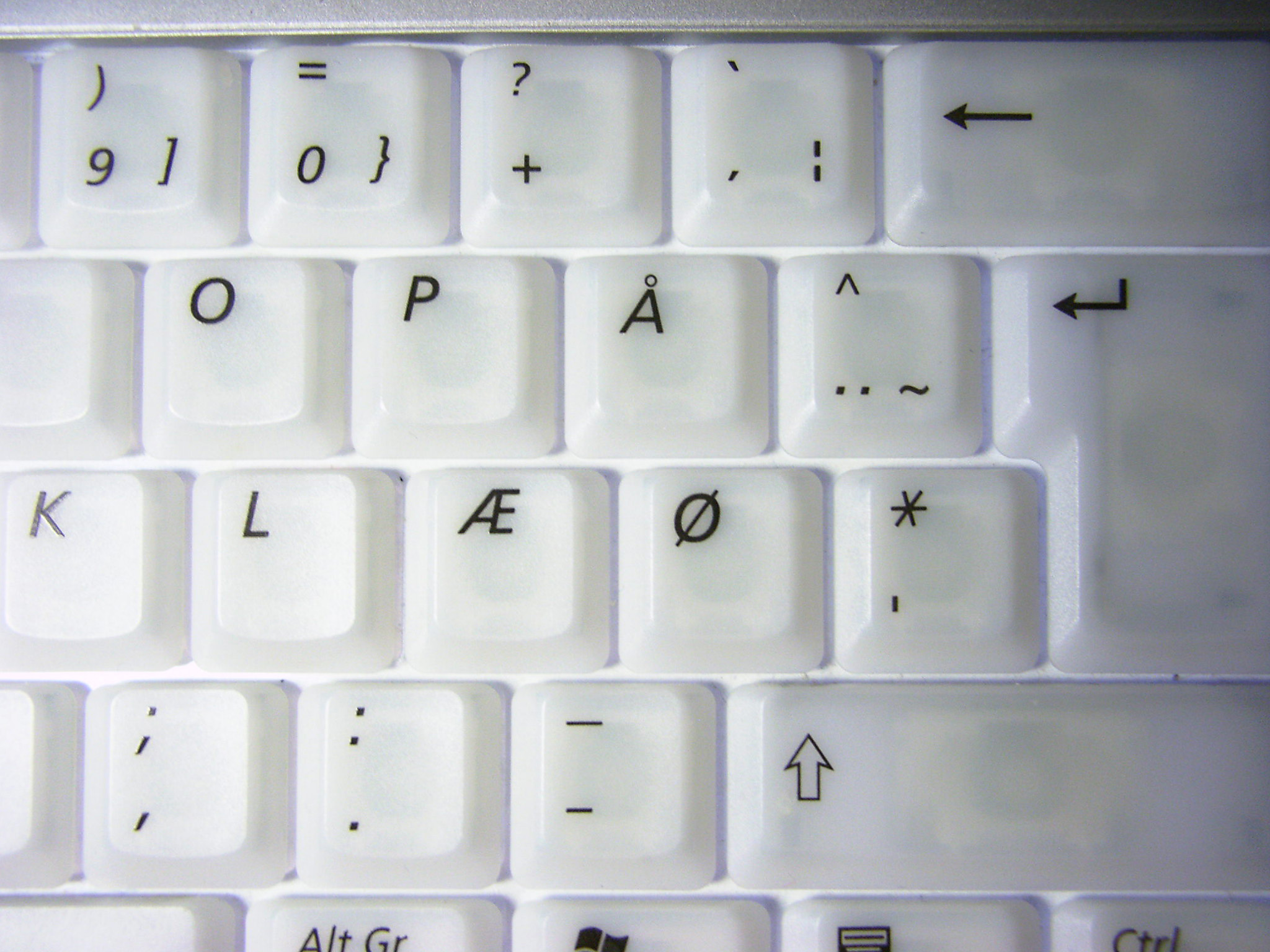
Danish keyboard with keys for Æ, Ø, and Å. On Norwegian keyboards the Æ and Ø switch places, matching the placement of the equivalent letters Ä and Ö on Swedish keyboards.

Some 7-bit ASCII variants defined by ISO/IEC 646 use 0x5C for Ø and 0x7C for ø, replacing the backslash and vertical bar. The most common locations in EBCDIC code pages is 0x80 and 0x70. Most code pages used by MS-DOS such as CP437 did not contain this character; in Scandinavian codepages, Ø replaces the yen sign (¥) at 165, and ø replaces the ¢ sign at 162. The 8-bit ISO-8859-1 and similar sets used 0xD8 and 0xF8; these locations were then inherited by CP1252 on Windows, and by Unicode.

- U+00D8 Ø LATIN CAPITAL LETTER O WITH STROKE (&Oslash;)
- U+00F8 ø LATIN SMALL LETTER O WITH STROKE (&oslash;)

Not to be confused with the mathematical signs:

- U+2205 ∅ EMPTY SET (&empty;, &emptyset;, &emptyv;, &varnothing;)
- U+2300 ⌀ DIAMETER SIGN

== See also ==
- Æ
- Å
- Ä
- Œ
- Ö
- Slashed zero
