= Pilcrow =

Symbol (¶) to identify a paragraph

¶o

Pilcrow
- In Unicode: U+00B6 ¶ PILCROW SIGN (&para;)

Different from
- Different from: U+00A7 § SECTION SIGN

Related
- See also: U+204B ⁋ REVERSED PILCROW SIGN; U+2761 ❡ CURVED STEM PARAGRAPH SIGN ORNAMENT; U+2E3F ⸿ CAPITULUM; U+2E4D ⹍ PARAGRAPHUS MARK

Pilcrow in typefaces: Neue Helvetica, Arial, Consolas, Adobe Garamond Pro, Baskerville Old Face, Palatino Linotype, and Gentium

In typography, the pilcrow (¶) is a grapheme used to identify a paragraph. (Note: According the Oxford English Dictionary (3rd ed.), "the origin [of the word] is late Middle English: apparently from a variant of paragraph, remodelled after the more familiar words pill and crow. (Pill, a small round object; crow, a bird).) In editorial production the pilcrow typographic character is also known as the paragraph mark, the paragraph sign, the paragraph symbol, the paraph, and the blind P.

In writing and editorial practice, authors and editors use the pilcrow grapheme to indicate the start of separate paragraphs, and to identify a new paragraph within a long block of text without paragraph indentions, as in the book An Essay on Typography (1931), by Eric Gill. In the Middle Ages, the practice of rubrication (type in red-ink) used a red pilcrow to indicate the beginning of a different train of thought within the author's narrative without paragraphs.

The letterform of the pilcrow resembles a minuscule q or a mirrored majuscule P, with a usually-doubled backbone reaching from the descender to the ascender height. The bowl on the left side can be filled or empty, and occasionally extends far enough downward that the character resembles a mirrored D. The backbone is usually straight, but in some fonts curves toward the bowl.

== Origin ==
=== Use in Ancient Greek ===
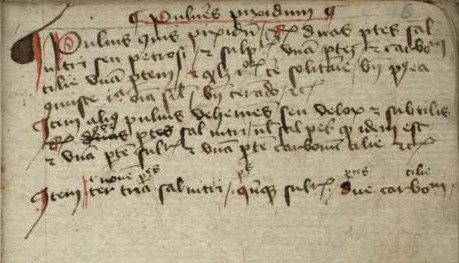
Three short paragraphs on making gunpowder in the manuscript GNM 3227a (Germany, c. 1400); the first paragraph is marked with an early form of the pilcrow sign, the two following paragraphs are introduced with litterae notabiliores (enlarged letters).

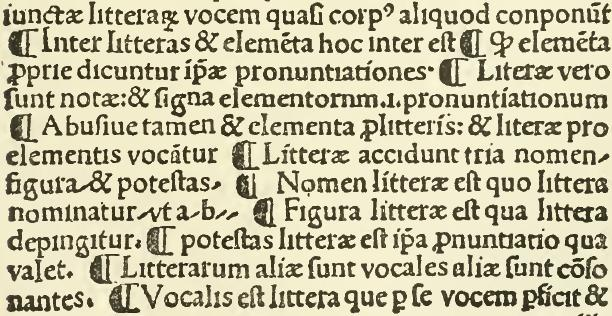
Pilcrow signs in an excerpt from a page of Villanova, Rudimenta Grammaticæ, printed by Spindeler in 1500 in Valencia.

Possible development from capitulum to modern paragraph symbol.

The first way to divide sentences into groups in Ancient Greek was the original παράγραφος (parágraphos), which was a horizontal line in the margin to the left of the main text. As the paragraphos became more popular, the horizontal line eventually changed into the Greek letter gamma (⟨Γ⟩, ⟨γ⟩) and later into litterae notabiliores, which were enlarged letters at the beginning of a paragraph.

=== Use in Latin ===
The above notation soon changed to the letter ⟨K⟩, an abbreviation for the Latin word caput, which translates as "head", i.e. it marks the head of a new thesis. Eventually, to mark a new section, the Latin word capitulum, which translates as "little head", was used, and the letter ⟨C⟩ came to mark a new section, or chapter, in 300 BC.

=== Use in Middle Ages ===
In the 1100s, ⟨C⟩ had completely replaced ⟨K⟩ as the symbol for a new chapter. Rubricators eventually added one or two vertical bars to the C to stylize it (as ⸿); the "bowl" of the symbol was filled in with dark ink and eventually looked like the modern pilcrow, ¶.

Scribes would often leave space before paragraphs to allow rubricators to add a hand-drawn pilcrow in contrasting ink. With the introduction of the printing press from the late medieval period on, space before paragraphs was still left for rubricators to complete by hand. If it was not practical to complete the rubrication, books might be sold with the spaces before the paragraphs left blank, thus creating the typographical practice of indentation.

== Modern use ==
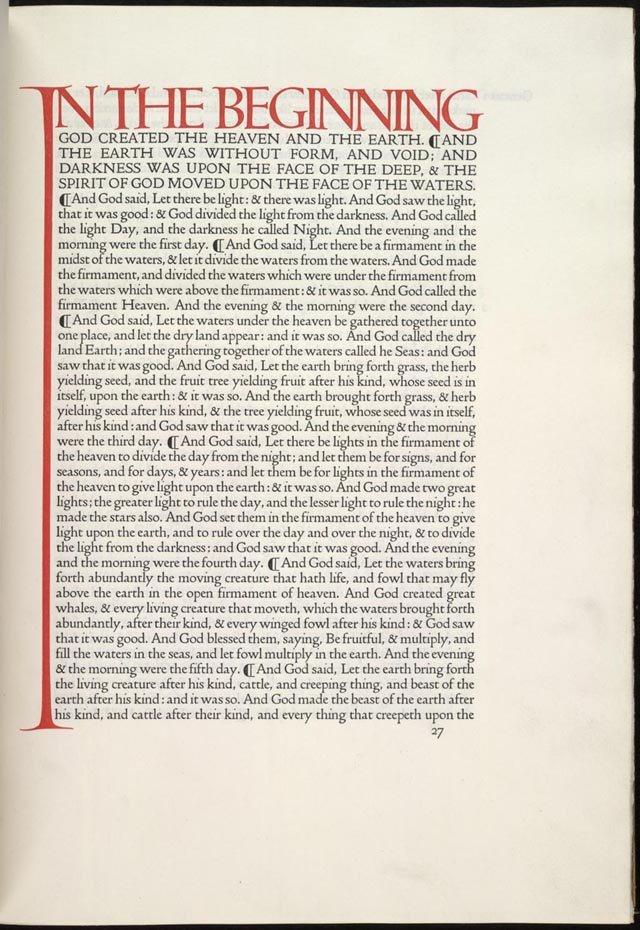
Opening page of Genesis from the Doves Bible (Doves Press, 1902): pilcrow used as a verse marker

The pilcrow remains in use in modern documents in the following ways:

- In legal writing, it is often used whenever one cites a specific paragraph within pleadings, law review articles, statutes, or other legal documents and materials. It is also used to indicate a paragraph break within quoted text.
- In academic writing, it is sometimes used as an in-text referencing tool to make reference to a specific paragraph from a document that does not contain page numbers, allowing the reader to find where that particular idea or statistic was sourced. The pilcrow sign followed by a number indicates the paragraph number from the top of the page. It is rarely used when citing books or journal articles.
- In web publishing style guides, a pilcrow may be used to indicate an anchor link.
- In proofreading, it indicates an instruction that one paragraph should be split into two or more separate paragraphs. The proofreader inserts the pilcrow at the point where a new paragraph should begin.
- In some high-church Anglican and Ordinariate churches, it is used in the order of service to introduce "stage directions" or other instructions concerning the conduct of the liturgy. These may indicate when the congregation should stand, sit, or kneel, direct the movements and actions of the clergy and other ministers, specify who participates in particular portions of the service, or provide similar ceremonial instructions. King's College, Cambridge uses this convention in the service booklet for the Festival of Nine Lessons and Carols. This is analogous to the writing of these instructions in red in some rubrication conventions.

The pilcrow is also often used in word processing and desktop publishing software:

- As the toolbar icon used to toggle the display of formatting marks, such as tabs and paragraph breaks.
- As the symbol for a paragraph break, shown when display is requested.

The pilcrow may indicate a footnote in a convention that uses a set of distinct typographic symbols in turn to distinguish between footnotes on a given page; it is the sixth in a series of footnote symbols beginning with the asterisk. (The modern convention is to use numbers or letters in superscript form.)

== Encoding ==
The pilcrow character was encoded as 0xB6 (decimal 182) in Digital Equipment Corporation's 1983 proprietary extension to ASCII, the "Multinational Character Set". This encoding was inherited by ISO/IEC 8859-1 ("ISO Latin-1", 1987), and then by Unicode.

Unicode additionally defines U+204B ⁋ REVERSED PILCROW SIGN, U+2761 ❡ CURVED STEM PARAGRAPH SIGN ORNAMENT, and U+2E3F ⸿ CAPITULUM. The capitulum character is obsolete, having been replaced by the pilcrow, but is included in Unicode for backward compatibility and historic studies.

The pilcrow symbol was included in the default hardware codepage 437 of IBM PCs (and all other 8-bit OEM codepages based on this) at code point 20 (0x14), which is an ASCII control character.

== Paragraph signs in non-Latin writing systems ==
In Sanskrit and other Indian languages that use Brahmic scripts, text blocks are commonly written in stanzas. Two vertical bars, ॥, called a double daṇḍa, are the functional equivalent of a pilcrow.

In Thai, the character fongman (๏) marks the beginning of a stanza and paiyannoi sara a (ฯ ะ) or angkhankhu sara a (๚ ะ) marks the end of a stanza.

In Amharic, the characters 'Ethiopic section mark' (፠) and 'Ethiopic paragraph separator' (፨) can mark a section or paragraph, respectively.

In China, the ideograpic number zero (〇), which has been used as a zero character since the 12th century, has been used to mark paragraphs in older Western-made books such as the Chinese Union Version of the Bible.
