= Section sign =

Character (§) for referencing sections

§o

Section sign
- In Unicode: U+00A7 § SECTION SIGN (&sect;)

Related
- See also: U+00B6 ¶ PILCROW SIGN

The section sign (§) is a typographical symbol for referencing individually numbered sections of a document; it is frequently used when citing sections of a legal code. It is also known as the section symbol, section mark, double-s, or silcrow.

The section sign typically appears akin to a letter S stacked on top of another S.

== Use ==
The section sign is often used when referring to a specific section of a legal code. For example, in Bluebook style, "Title 16 of the United States Code Section 580p" becomes "16 U.S.C. § 580p". The section sign is frequently used along with the pilcrow (or paragraph sign), ¶, to reference a specific paragraph within a section of a document. However, some jurisdictions prefer the sign be avoided, and rather that the word "section" be written out in full.

While § is usually read in spoken English as the word section, many other languages use the word paragraph exclusively to refer to a section of a document (especially of legal text), and use other words to describe a paragraph in the English sense. Consequently, in those cases "§" may be read as "paragraph", and may occasionally also be described as a "paragraph sign", but this is a description of its usage, not a formal name.

When duplicated, as §§, it is read as the plural "sections". For example, "§§ 13–21" would be read as "sections 13 through 21", much as pp. (pages) is the plural of p., meaning page.

It may also be used with footnotes when asterisk *, dagger †, and double dagger ‡ have already been used on a given page.

It is common practice to follow the section sign with a non-breaking space so that the symbol is kept with the section number being cited.

This is also used in German language (German: Paragraf). For example, "§ 242 im deutschen Strafgesetzbuch" (article 242 of the German Criminal Code).

== Unicode ==
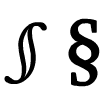
Two common representations of the section sign

The section sign appeared in several early computer text encodings. It was placed at 0xA7 (167) in ISO-8859-1, a position that was inherited by Unicode as code point U+00A7 § SECTION SIGN. Representation of the sign is an artistic decision within the overall design language of the typeface (or computer font): the two more commonly seen forms are shown here. In all cases, the sign is encoded by U+00A7.

== Origin ==
Two possible origins are often posited for the section sign: most probably, that it is a ligature formed by the combination of two S glyphs (from the Latin signum sectiōnis). Some scholars, however, are skeptical of this explanation.

Others have theorized that it is an adaptation of the Ancient Greek παράγραφος (paragraphos), a catch-all term for a class of punctuation marks used by scribes with diverse shapes and intended uses.

The modern form of the sign, with its modern meaning, has been in use since the 15th century.

== Other usages for the symbol ==
In Jaroslav Hašek's The Good Soldier Švejk, the § symbol is used repeatedly to mean "bureaucracy"; Paul Selver translated it as "red tape" in his 1930 English translation.

In The Sims and SimCity video game franchises, the § symbol represents the fictional "Simoleon" in-game currency.

== See also ==
- Pilcrow (¶), the historic indicator of an (un-numbered) new paragraph in English
- Scilicet ("it may be known") is sometimes rendered using a § mark instead of "viz."
