= 1964 in Norway =

- Centuries: 18th; 19th; 20th; 21st
- Decades: 1940s; 1950s; 1960s; 1970s; 1980s
- See also: List of years in Norway

Events in the year 1964 in Norway.

== Incumbents ==
- Monarch – Olav V.
- Prime Minister – Einar Gerhardsen (Labour Party)

== Events ==
- 1 January – Brevik Municipality, Porsgrunn Municipality, and Eidanger Municipality are merged to form an enlarged Porsgrunn Municipality
- 14 September – Tromsø Airport is officially opened for traffic
- 26 November – The ocean liner SS Shalom accidentally rammed the Norwegian tanker Stolt Dagali outside New York, resulting in the loss of 19 Stolt Dagali crew members as well as the stern of the tanker.
- 10 December - Rev. Dr. Martin Luther King, Jr. received the Nobel Prize for Peace during an awards ceremony in Oslo, Norway. Since 1964 all of the documents related to this award, such as the notes, nominations, and reports have been classified as secret and kept under lock and key in the Norwegian Nobel Committee's extensive archive.

== Popular culture ==
=== Sports ===
- At the Winter Olympics in Innsbruck, Austria, Norway finishes 10th in the medal table, with a total of 15 medals, including three golds. However, despite sending 26 competitors to the Summer Olympics in Tokyo, Norway fails to win any medals there.

=== Literature ===
- Odd Hølaas, journalist and writer, wins the Riksmål Society Literature Prize
- Tarjei Vesaas is awarded the Nordic Council Literature Prize, for Is-slottet.

== Notable births ==
=== January ===
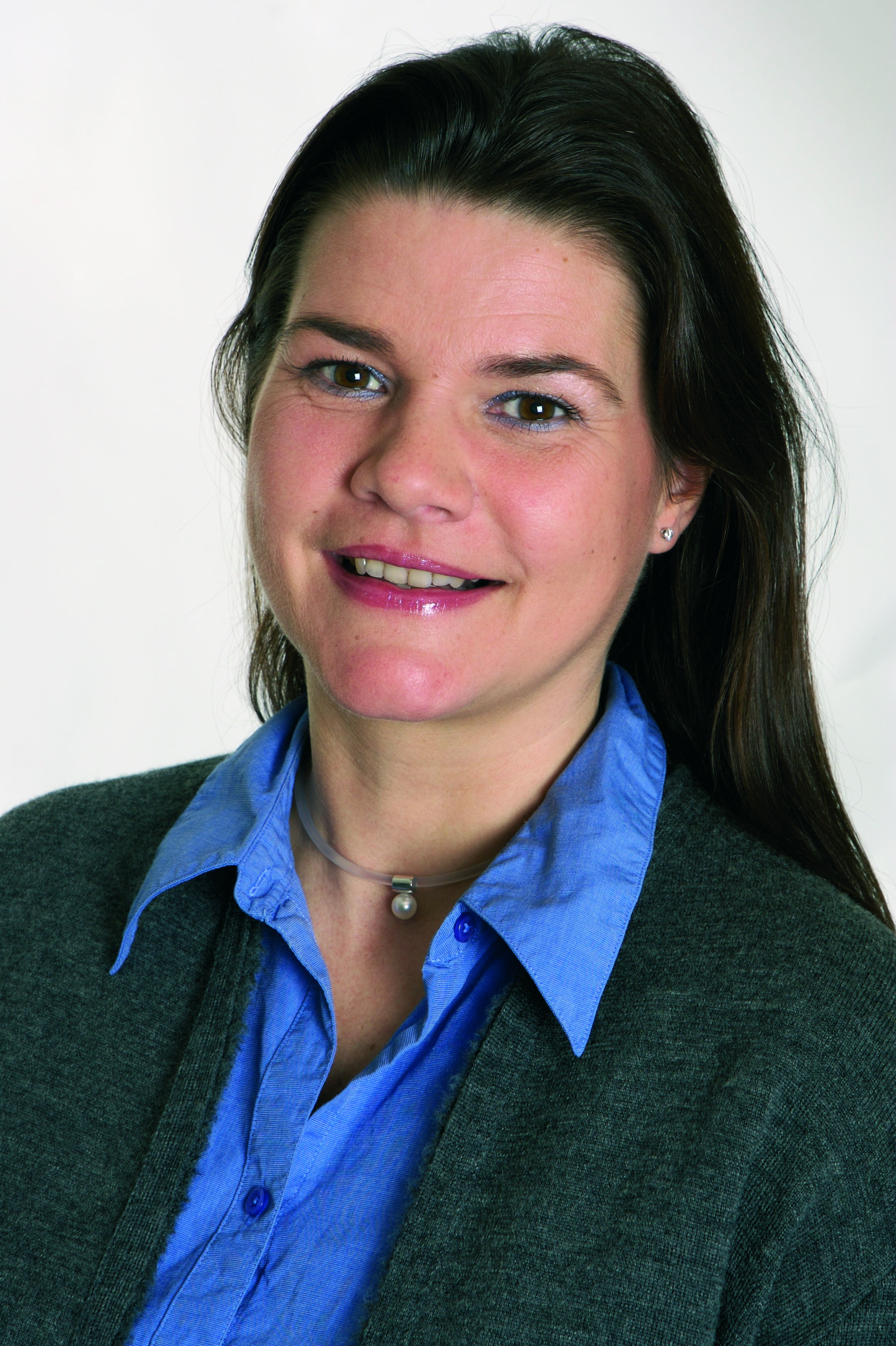
Anette Wiig Bryn

- 3 January – Geir Elsebutangen, politician.
- 8 January – Gunn Elin Flakne, politician.
- 11 January – Torstein Aagaard-Nilsen, composer
- 14 January – Anne Kathrine Slungård, politician.
- 15 January – Jarl Eriksen, ice hockey player.
- 20 January – Osmund Kaldheim, civil servant and politician.
- 22 January – Christine B. Meyer, civil servant and politician.
- 26 January – Guro Fjellanger, politician (died 2019).
- 27 January – Per Dybvig, illustrator and author of picture books.
- 30 January – Anette Wiig Bryn, politician.

=== February ===
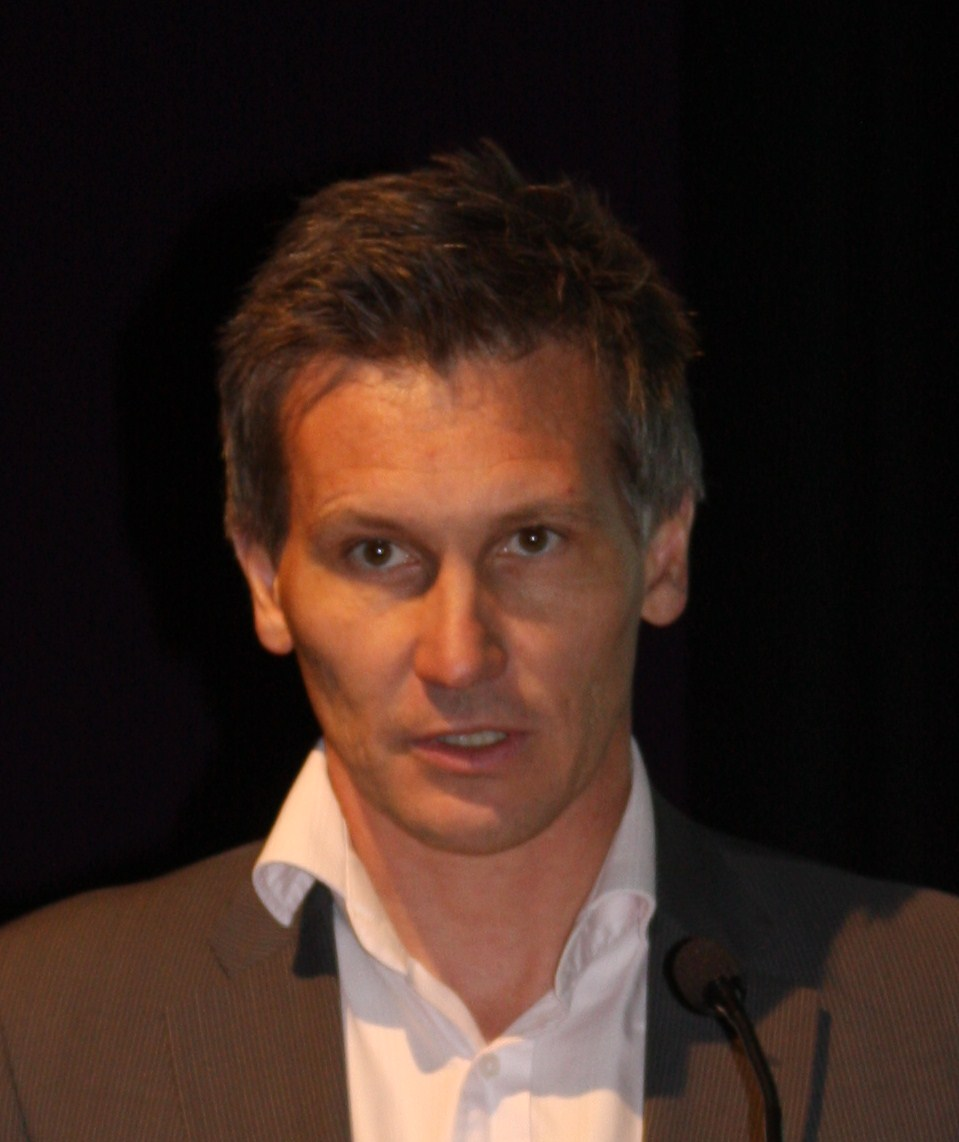
Bjørn Erik Thon

- 1 February – Bugge Wesseltoft, jazz musician, pianist, composer and producer
- 6 February
  - Tone Haugen, footballer.
  - Bjørn Erik Thon, politician, jurist and civil servant.
- 13 February – Are Nakkim, athlete.
- 17 February – Olve Grotle, politician.
- 28 February – Hans Morten Hansen, comedian.

=== March ===
- 9 March
  - Torgeir Bjørn, cross-country skier.
  - Unni Olsbye, chemist.
- 14 March – Kathy Lie, politician.
- 28 March – Håkon Nissen-Lie, windsurfer.
- 31 March – Villa Kulild, civil servant.

=== April ===
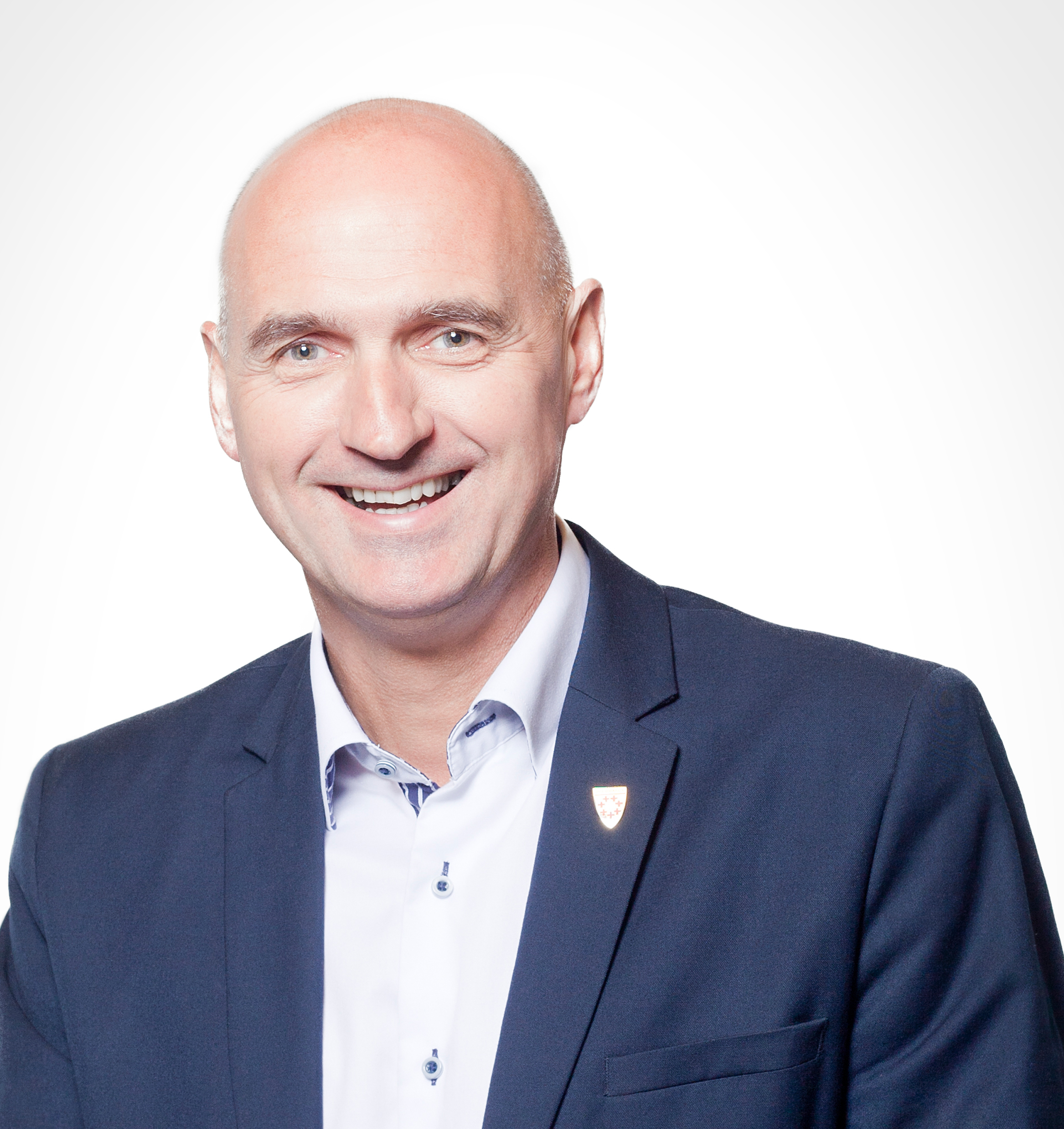
Per Olav Tyldum

- 3 April – Schirin Zorriasateiny, rhythmic gymnast.
- 5 April – Truls Kristiansen, ice hockey player.
- 16 April – Peter Arne Ruzicka, businessperson.
- 18 April – Nina Mjøberg, politician.
- 22 April – Johannes Eick, jazz musician.
- 24 April – Per Olav Tyldum, politician.
- 25 April – Tom Roger Aadland, singer and songwriter.
- 29 April – Thomas Robsahm, film producer and director.

=== May ===
Espen Barth Eide

- 1 May – Espen Barth Eide, politician.
- 4 May – Roy Lønhøiden, country musician.
- 6 May – Arild Midthun, comics artist.
- 11 May – Janne Sjelmo Nordås, politician.
- 13 May – Harald Devold, jazz musician (died 2016).
- 15 May – Marit Moum Aune, stage director.
- 15 May – Levi Henriksen, novelist, short story writer and singer-songwriter.
- 16 May – Kim Søgaard, ice hockey player.
- 21 May – Gunn-Vivian Eide, politician.
- 22 May – Inge Andersen, sports coach and sports official.
- 26 May – Jon Gelius, journalist and television news editor

=== June ===
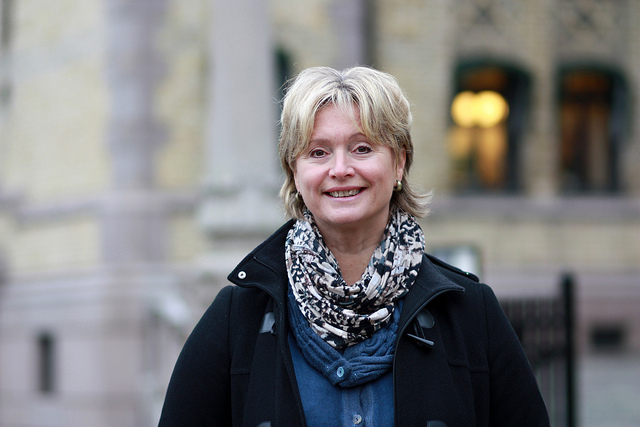
Tove-Lise Torve

- 7 June – Geir Lippestad, lawyer.
- 8 June – Tove-Lise Torve, politician.
- 18 June – Harald Furre, politician.
- 22 June – Henrik Mestad, actor

=== July ===
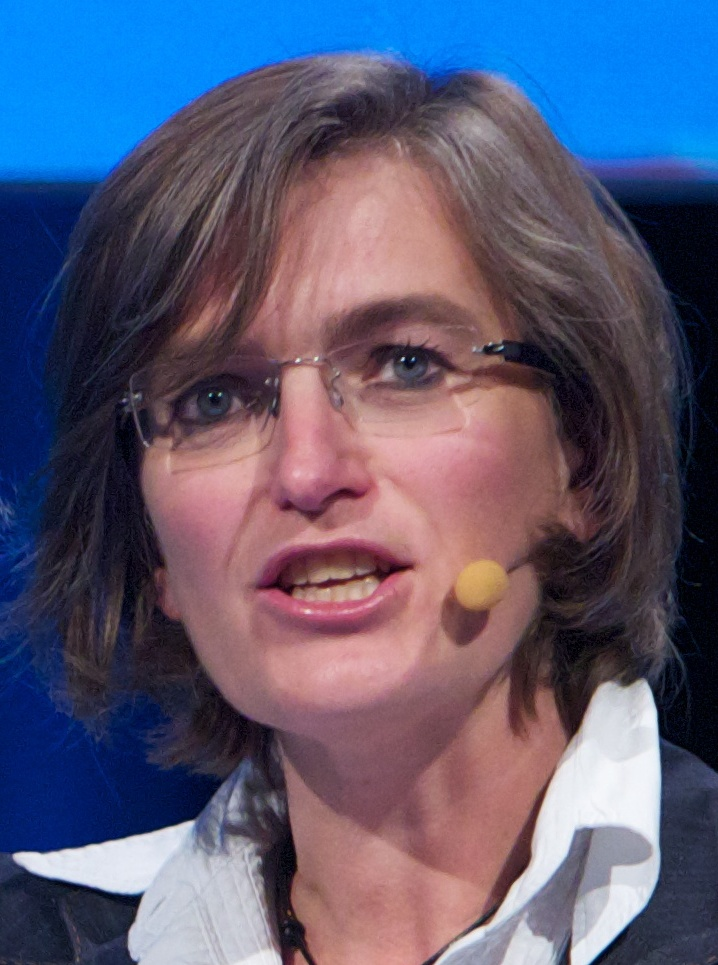
Ellen Hambro

- 20 July
  - Martin Engeset, politician.
  - Ellen Hambro, civil servant.
- 22 July – Anneke von der Lippe, actress.
- 24 July – Tor Inge Eidesen, politician.
- 26 July – Roar Engelberg, flutist.
- 29 July – Atle Pedersen, cyclist.

=== August ===
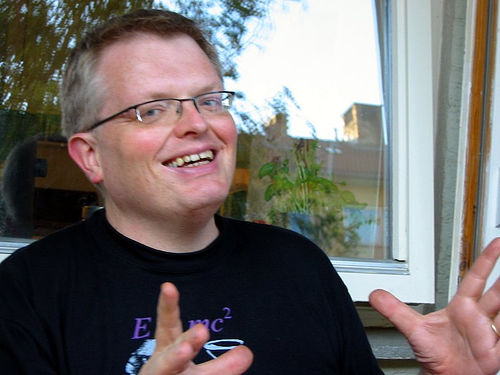
Eirik Newth

- 17 August – Eirik Newth, astrophysicist and writer.
- 19 August – Torgeir Bryn, basketball player.
- 23 August – Trond Henry Blattmann, politician.
- 24 August – Nils Andreas Stensønes, naval officer and head of the Norwegian Intelligence Service.
- 26 August – Aasmund Nordstoga, folk musician.

=== September ===
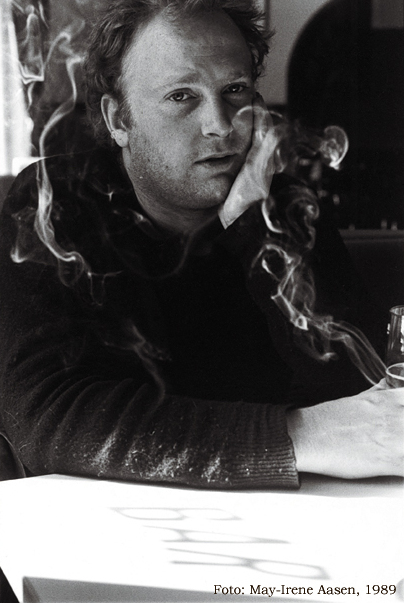
Joachim Nielsen

- 3 September
  - Øystein Havang, handball player.
  - Grete Kirkeberg, long-distance runner.
- 7 September
  - Anita Orlund, politician.
  - Andrine Sæther, actress.
- 8 September – Joachim Nielsen, rock musician (died 2000).
- 9 September – Morten Rønneberg, tennis player.
- 11 September – Morten Ørsal Johansen, politician.
- 16 September – Tine Tollan, diver.
- 19 September – Bjarne Brøndbo, musician.

=== October ===
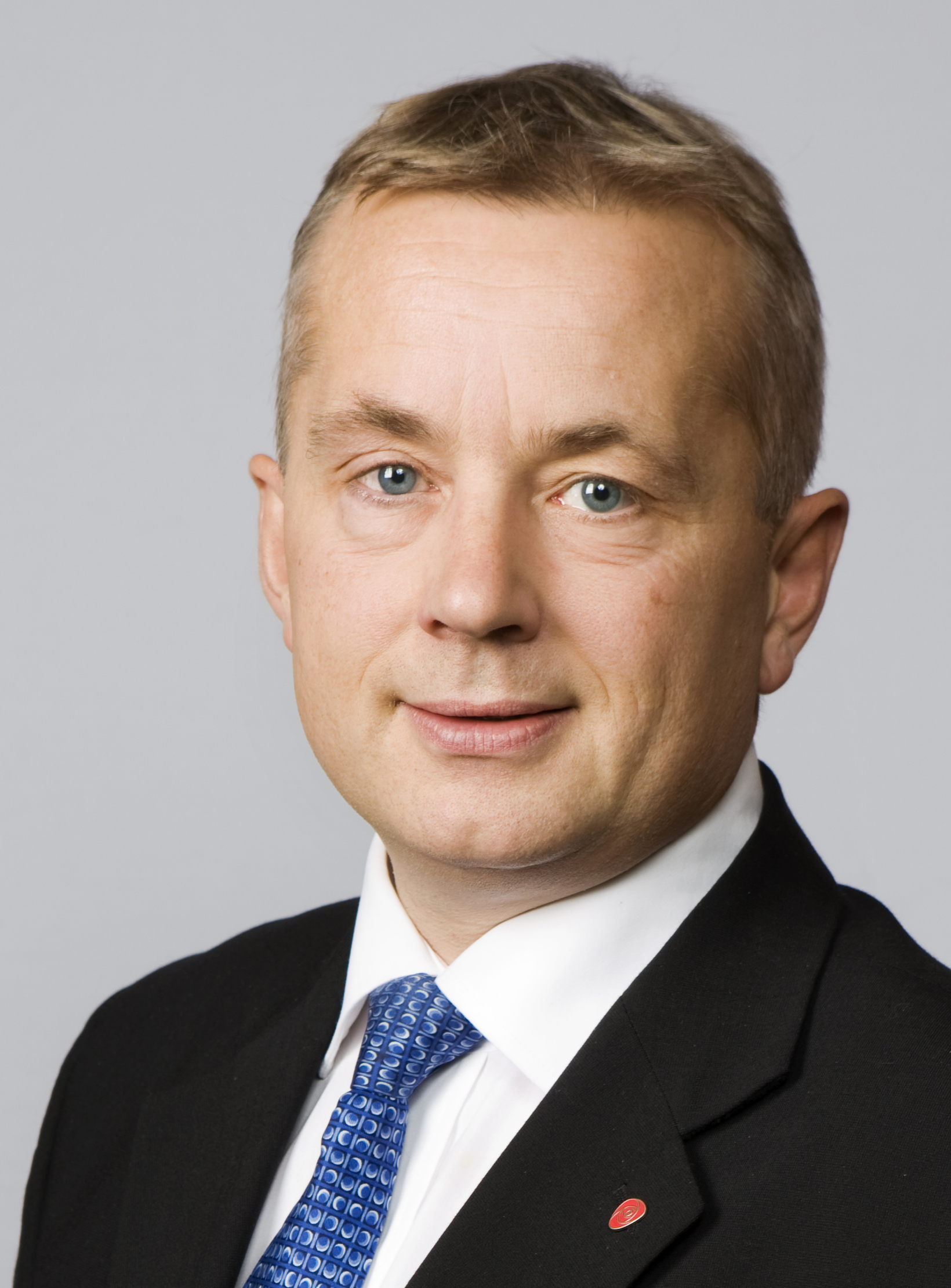
Knut Storberget

- 1 October – Lars Erik Flatø, politician.
- 3 October – Jostein Flo, footballer.
- 6 October – Knut Storberget, politician.
- 8 October – Odd Emil Ingebrigtsen, politician.
- 21 October – Liv Strædet, footballer.
- 24 October – Frode Grodås, footballer.

=== November ===
- 2 November – Jarle Friis, ice hockey player.
- 20 November – Hanne Harlem, politician.
- 21 November – Karin Pettersen, handball player.

=== December ===
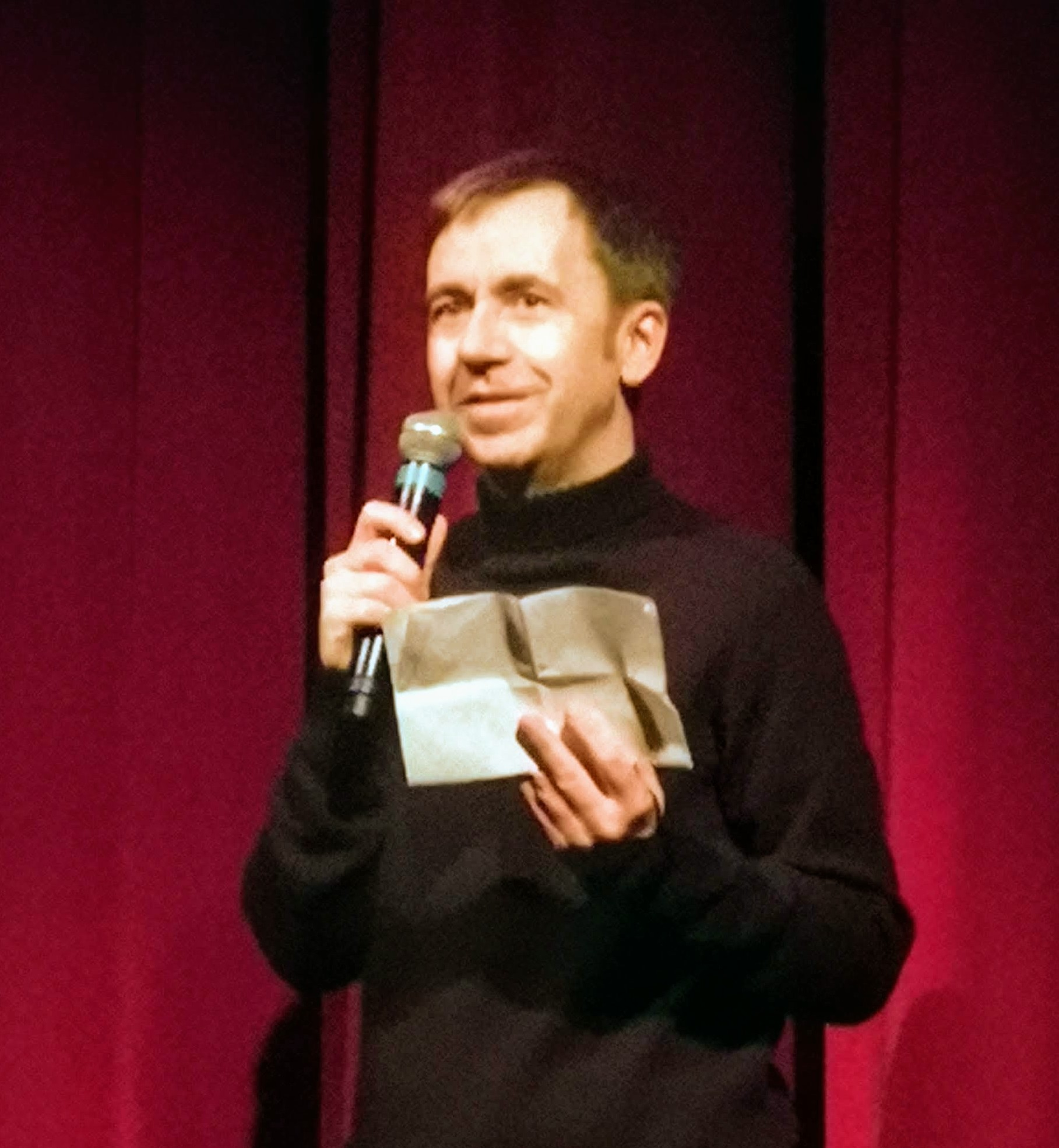
Dag Johan Haugerud

- 8 December – Christian Hintze Holm, politician.
- 10 December – Ellen Christine Christiansen, politician.
- 14 December
  - Erik Johan Sæbø, cyclist.
  - Erik Skjoldbjærg, film director
- 20 December – Ulf Erik Knudsen, politician.
- 27 December – Tor Mikkel Wara, politician.
- 30 December – Dag Johan Haugerud, librarian, novelist, screenwriter and film director.

=== Full date missing ===
- Mette Andersson, sociologist and university professor.
- Mette Barlie, sport wrestler.
- Kristine Næss, writer.
- Christian Wolther, artist and writer, playwright, director and pedagogue.

== Notable deaths ==
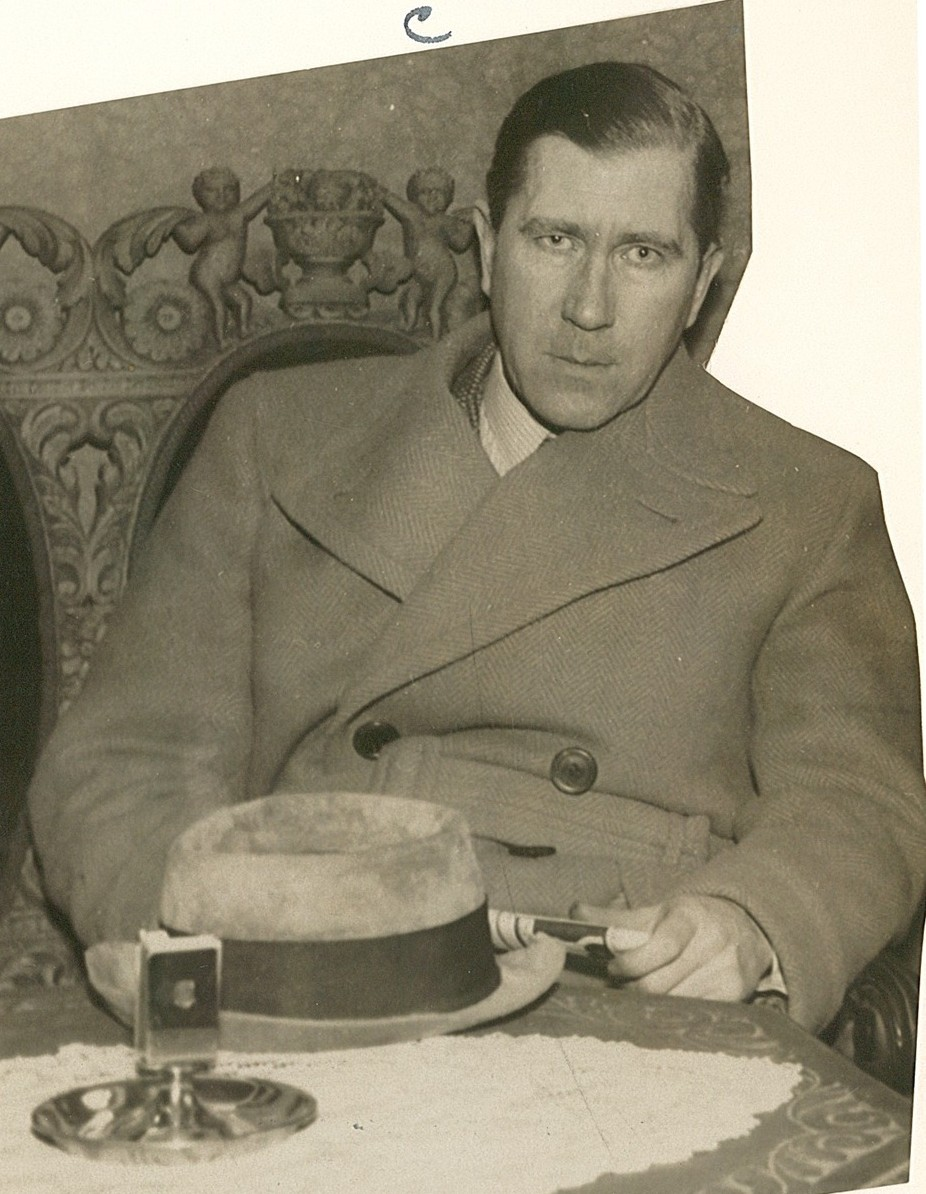
Gunnar Reiss-Andersen in 1935

- 4 January – Trygve Jacobsen, Norwegian businessperson (b. 1876)
- 15 January – Oscar Guttormsen, athlete (b.1884)
- 16 January – Henry Jacobsen, politician (b.1898)
- 30 January – Edvard Christian Danielsen, military officer (born 1888).
- 5 May – Gunnar Kalrasten, politician (b.1905)
- 7 May – Gustav Sjaastad, politician and Minister (b.1902)
- 28 May – Marius Ormestad, trade unionist and civil servant (born 1874).
- 18 June – Egil Rasmussen, author, literature critic and musician (b.1903)
- 18 June – Olaf Syvertsen, gymnast and Olympic silver medallist (b.1884)
- 29 July – Gunnar Reiss-Andersen, poet and author (b.1896)
- 31 July – Otto Huseklepp, politician (b.1892)
- 25 August – Bernhard Berthelsen, politician (b.1897)
- 28 August – Anders Lundgren, sailor and Olympic gold medallist (b.1898).
- 26 September – Einar Strøm, gymnast and Olympic gold medallist (b.1885).
- 6 October – Ole Aanderud Larsen, ship designer and businessperson (b.1884)
- 8 October – Ragnar Haugen, boxer (b.1911)
- 29 October – Henry Larsen, Arctic explorer in Canada (b.1899)
- 31 October – Kåre Christiansen, bobsledder (b.1911)
- 27 November – Erling Johannes Norvik, politician (b.1899)
- 21 December – Emil Stang, jurist and politician (born 1882).
- 31 December – Peder Alsvik, politician (b.1882)

=== Full date unknown ===
- Lauritz Bergendahl, Nordic skier (b.1887)
- Einar Halvorsen, speed skater (b.1872)
- Hans Severin Jelstrup, astronomer (b.1893)
- Sigurd Halvorsen Johannessen, politician (b.1881)
- Jon Jørundson Mannsåker, priest and politician (b.1880)
- Lars Magnus Moen, politician and Minister (b.1885)
