= Blattmann =

Blattmann is a surname. Notable people with the surname include:

- Albert Blattmann (1904–1967), Swiss cyclist
- André Blattmann (born 1956), Swiss military officer
- Aud Blattmann (1937–2023), Norwegian politician
- René Blattmann (born 1948), Bolivian judge, lawyer and politician
- Trond Henry Blattmann (born 1964), Norwegian politician

== See also ==
- Blattman
