= Æ =

Ligature of the Latin letters A and E

- Æ æ ᴁ

Usage
- Writing system: Latin script
- Type: Alphabetic
- Language of origin: Latin
- Sound values: [æ]; [a]; [ɐ]; [i]; [ɛ]; [e]; [ai̯]
- In Unicode: U+00C6, U+00E6

History
- Development: AE ae: Æ æ ᴁ
- Sisters: Ӕ

Other
- Writing direction: Left-to-right

Æ in Helvetica and Bodoni

Æ alone and in context

Æ (minuscule: æ), known as ash or æsh, is a Latin-script character. It is a ligature of a and e, originally representing the Latin diphthong ae. It is considered a letter in some languages, including Danish, Norwegian, Icelandic, and Faroese. It was also used in both Old Swedish, before being replaced by ä, and Old English, where it was eventually dropped entirely in favour of a. The modern International Phonetic Alphabet uses it to represent the near-open front unrounded vowel (the vowel of "cat" in a general American accent). Diacritic variants include Ǣ/ǣ, Ǽ/ǽ, Æ̀/æ̀, Æ̂/æ̂ and Æ̃/æ̃. (Note: More information may be found at their entries on Wiktionary ( ǣ, ᴂ, etc.), and on the appendix page there entitled Variations of ae.)

As a letter of the Old English Latin alphabet, it was called æsc, "ash tree", after the Anglo-Saxon futhorc rune ᚫ which it transliterated; its traditional name in English is still ash, or æsh (Old English: æsċ) if the ligature is included.

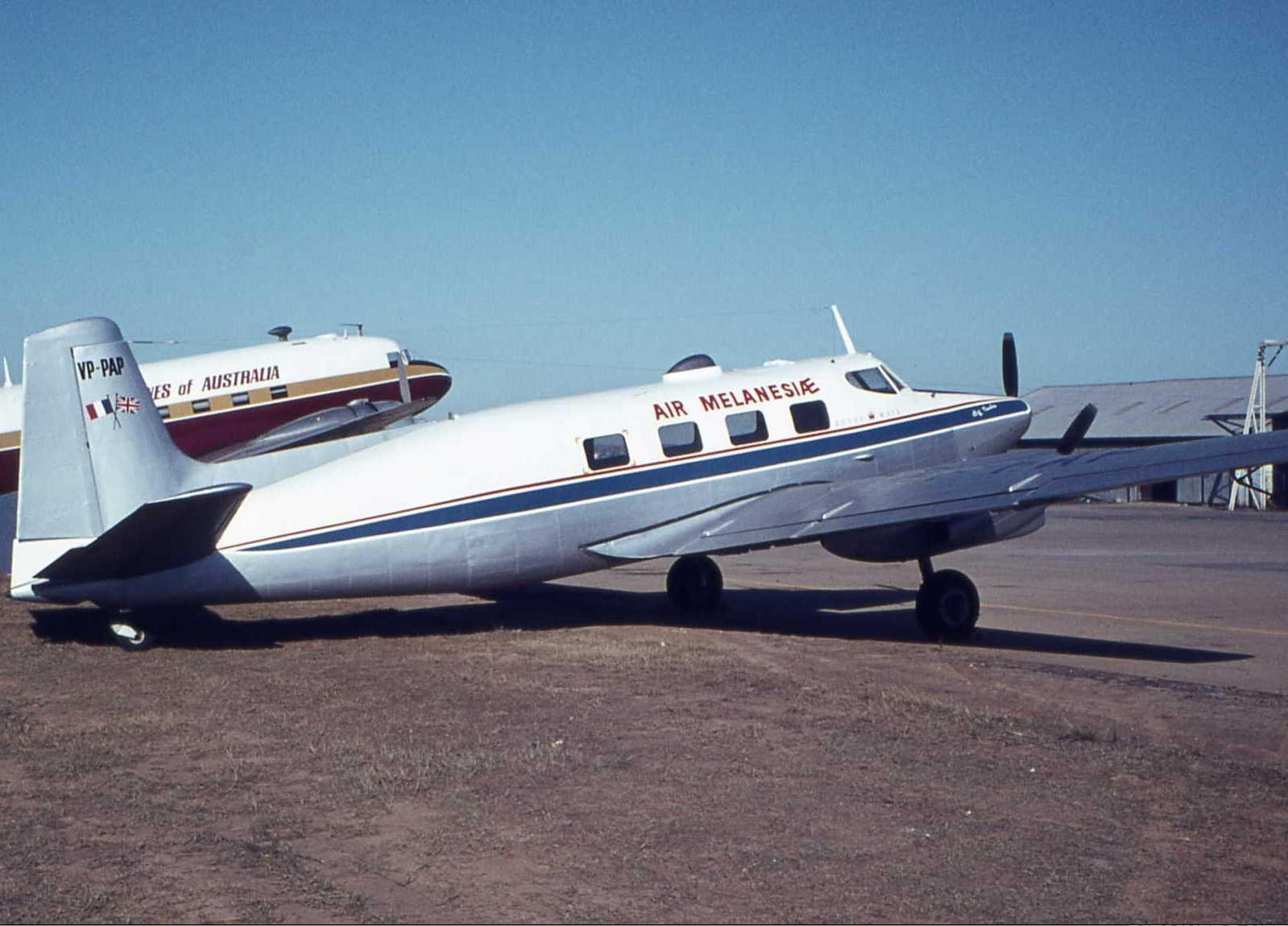
Vanuatu's domestic airline operated under the name Air Melanesiæ in the 1970s.

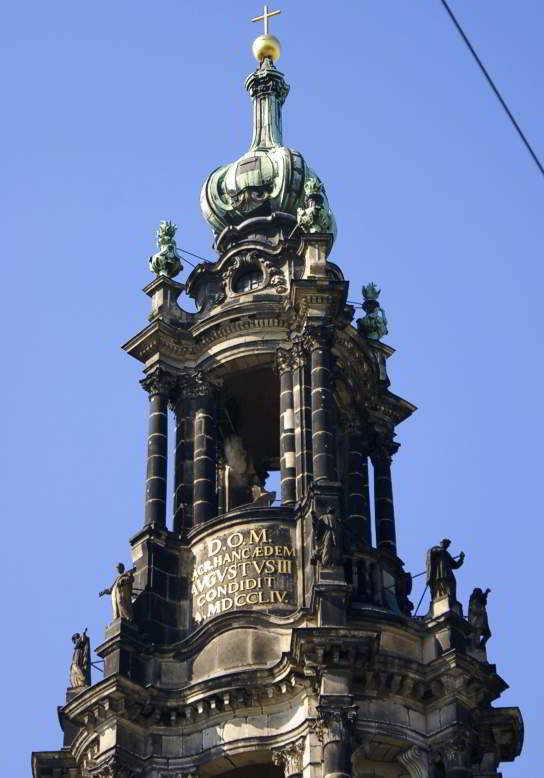
Æ on the Katholische Hofkirche in Dresden (at the beginning of "ÆDEM")

== Languages ==
=== English ===
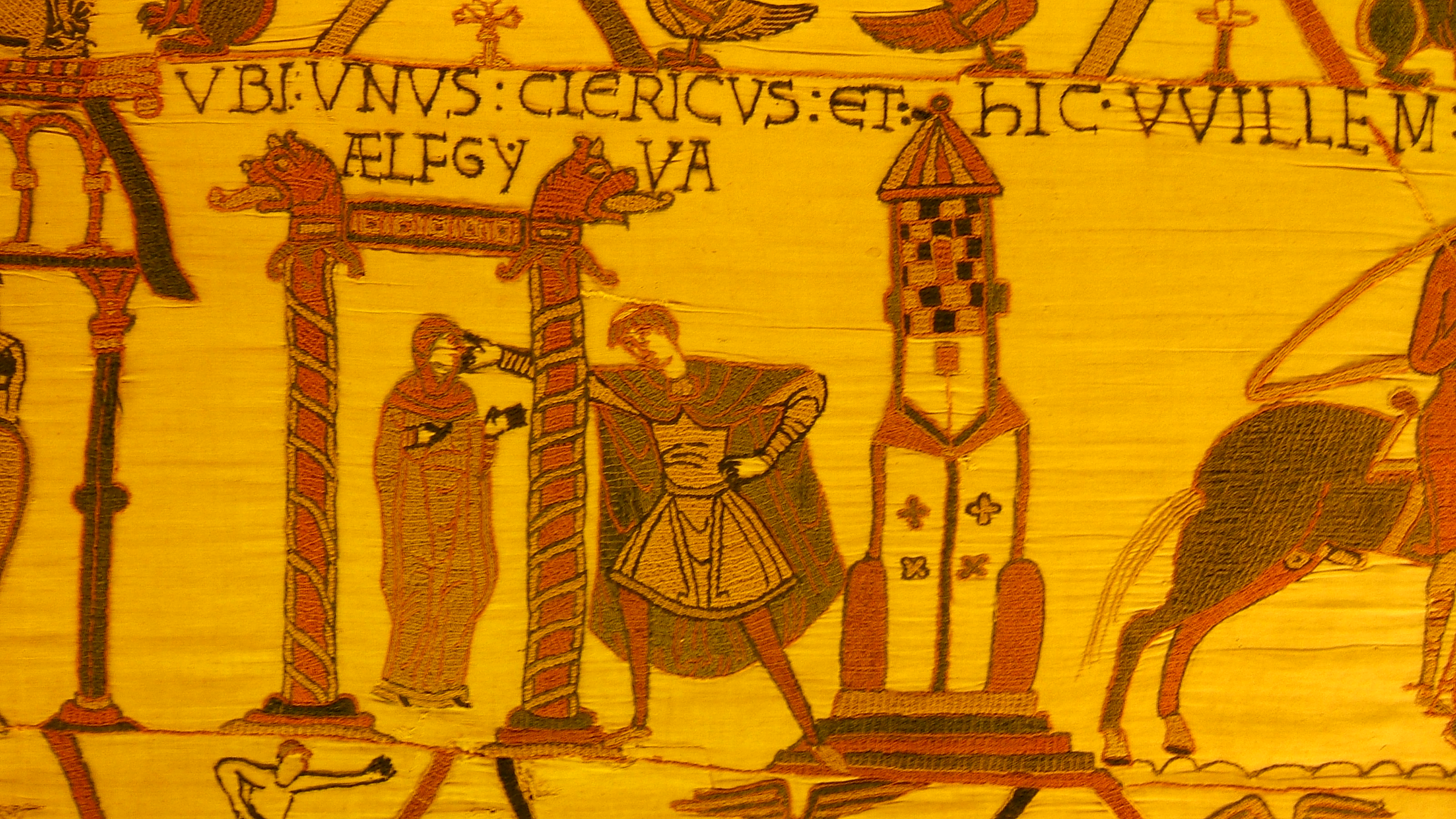
The name Ælfgyva, on the Bayeux Tapestry

In English, use of the ligature varies between different places and contexts, but it is fairly rare. In modern typography, if technological limitations make the use of æ difficult (such as in use of typewriters, telegraphs, or ASCII), the digraph ae is often used instead.

In Old English, æ represented a sound between a and e (/æ/), like the short a of cat in General American English.

In Modern English, usage of the ligature is often made unnecessary by the use of a shortened spelling with "e", as happened with œ as well; thus medieval is now the more common spelling than mediaeval (or the now rare mediæval). This process has occurred more consistently in American English, but can be found in other varieties of English as well. For example, the spelling as medieval is also the most prominent in the United Kingdom.

=== French ===
In the modern French alphabet, æ (called e-dans-l'a, 'e in the a') is used to spell Latin and Greek borrowings like curriculum vitæ, et cætera, ex æquo, tænia, and the first name Lætitia. It is mentioned in the name of Serge Gainsbourg's song Elaeudanla Téïtéïa, a reading of the French spelling of the name Lætitia: "L, A, E dans l'A, T, I, T, I, A."

=== Latin ===
In Classical Latin, the combination AE denotes the diphthong [ae̯], which had a value similar to the long i in fine as pronounced in most dialects of Modern English. Both classical and present practice is to write the letters separately, but the ligature was used in medieval and early modern writings, in part because æ was reduced to the simple vowel [ɛ] during the Roman Empire. In some medieval scripts, the ligature was simplified to ę, an e with ogonek, called the e caudata (Latin for "tailed e"). That was further simplified into a plain e, which may have influenced or been influenced by the pronunciation change. However the ligature is still relatively common in liturgical books and musical scores.

=== Other Germanic languages ===
Old Norse

In Old Norse, æ represents the long vowel /ɛː/. The short version of the same vowel, /ɛ/, if it is distinguished from /e/, is written as ę.

Icelandic

In Icelandic, æ represents the diphthong [ai], which can be long or short.

Faroese

In most varieties of Faroese, æ is pronounced as follows:

- [ɛa] when simultaneously stressed and occurring either word-finally, before a vowel letter, before a single consonant letter, or before the consonant-letter groups kl, kr, pl, pr, tr, kj, tj, sj, and those consisting of ð and one other consonant letter, except for ðr when pronounced like gr (except as below)
- a rather open [eː] when directly followed by the sound [a], as in ræðast (silent ð) and frægari (silent g)
- [a] in all other cases

One of its etymological origins is Old Norse é (the other is Old Norse æ), which is particularly evident in the dialects of Suðuroy, where Æ is [eː] or [ɛ]:

- æða ('eider'): Southern [eːa], Northern Faroese [ɛava]
- ætt ('family', 'direction'): Southern [ɛtː], Northern Faroese [atː]

German and Swedish

The equivalent letter in German and Swedish is ä. In German this letter is after 'z' and in Swedish it is the second-to-last letter (between å and ö).

In the normalized spelling of Middle High German, æ represents a long vowel [ɛː]. The actual spelling in the manuscripts varies, however.

Danish and Norwegian

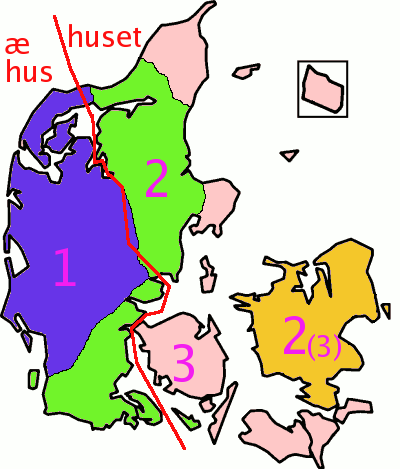
West of the red line through Jutland, classic Danish dialects use æ as the definite article. Additionally the northernmost and southernmost of that area use Æ as the first person singular pronoun I. The two words are different vowels.

In Danish and Norwegian, æ is a separate letter of the alphabet and represents a monophthong. It follows z and precedes ø and å. In Norwegian there are four ways of pronouncing the letter:

- /æː/ as in æ (the name of the letter), bær, Solskjær, læring, æra, Ænes, ærlig, tærne, Kværner, Dæhlie, særs, ærfugl, lært, trær ("trees")
- /æ/ as in færre, æsj, nærmere, Færder, Skjærvø, ærverdig, vært, lærd, Bræin (where æi is pronounced as a diphthong /æi/)
- /eː/ as in Sæther, Næser, Sæbø, gælisk, spælsau, bevæpne, sæd, æser, Cæsar, væte, trær ("thread(s)" [verb])
- /e/ as in Sæth, Næss, Brænne, Bækkelund, Vollebæk, væske, trædd

In many northern, western and southwestern Norwegian dialects such as Trøndersk and in the western Danish dialects of Thy and Southern Jutland, the word "I" (Standard Danish: jeg, Bokmål Norwegian: jeg, Nynorsk Norwegian: eg) is pronounced /æː/. Thus, when this word is written as it is pronounced in these dialects (rather than the standard), it is often spelled with the letter "æ".

In western and southern Jutish dialects of Danish, æ is also the proclitic definite article: æ hus (the house), as opposed to Standard Danish and all other Nordic varieties which have enclitic definite articles (Danish, Swedish, Norwegian: huset; Icelandic, Faroese: húsið [the house]).

=== Ossetian ===
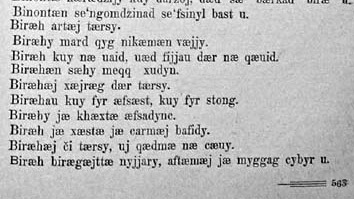
Ossetian Latin script; part of a page from a book published in 1935

Ossetian – which previously and later used a Cyrillic alphabet with an identical-looking letter (Ӕ and ӕ) – was written using the Latin script from 1923 to 1938, and included this character. It is pronounced as a near-open central vowel [ɐ].

=== South American languages ===
The letter Æ is used in the official orthography of the Kawésqar language, spoken in Chile and also in that of the Fuegian language Yaghan. In the orthographies of both languages, the letter represents /æ/. In Mochica, the exact sound value æ was used for is unknown, but is thought to be [ɨ].

== International Phonetic Alphabet ==
The symbol [æ] is also used in the International Phonetic Alphabet (IPA) to denote a near-open front unrounded vowel such as in the word cat in many dialects of Modern English, which is the sound that was most likely represented by the Old English letter. In the IPA it is always in lowercase. U+10783 𐞃 MODIFIER LETTER SMALL AE is a superscript IPA letter.

Uralic Phonetic Alphabet

The Uralic Phonetic Alphabet (UPA) uses four additional æ-related symbols, see Unicode table below.

== Unicode ==
- U+00C6 Æ LATIN CAPITAL LETTER AE
- U+00E6 æ LATIN SMALL LETTER AE
- U+01E2 Ǣ LATIN CAPITAL LETTER AE WITH MACRON
- U+01E3 ǣ LATIN SMALL LETTER AE WITH MACRON
- U+01FC Ǽ LATIN CAPITAL LETTER AE WITH ACUTE
- U+01FD ǽ LATIN SMALL LETTER AE WITH ACUTE
- U+1D01 ᴁ LATIN LETTER SMALL CAPITAL AE (UPA)
- U+1D02 ᴂ LATIN SMALL LETTER TURNED AE (UPA)
- U+1D2D ᴭ MODIFIER LETTER CAPITAL AE (UPA)
- U+1D46 ᵆ MODIFIER LETTER SMALL TURNED AE (UPA)
- U+1DD4 ◌ᷔ COMBINING LATIN SMALL LETTER AE
- U+10783 𐞃 MODIFIER LETTER SMALL AE (IPA)

== See also ==
- AE (Cyrillic)
- Ae (digraph)
- Å
- Ä
- Ę
- Ø
- Ö
- Œ
- Near-open front unrounded vowel (represented by æ in the IPA)
- Ə
- Ansuz rune
- List of English words that may be spelled with a ligature
