= Mjoberg =

Mjoberg (and variants) may refer to:

- Eric Mjöberg (1882–1938), Swedish zoologist and ethnographer
- Nina Mjøberg (born 1964), Norwegian politician

== See also ==
- Mjoberg's toadlet, species of frog endemic to Australia
- Mjöberg's dwarf litter frog, species of frog endemic to Borneo
