= E caudata =

Modified letter E used in transcribing old Gaelic, Latin and Old Norse texts

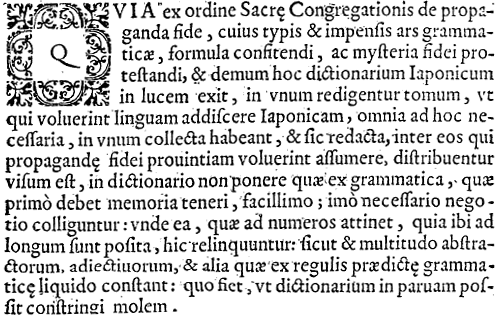
Part of a Latin book published in Rome in 1632. E caudata is used in the words Sacrę, propagandę, prædictę, and grammaticę. The spelling grammaticæ, with æ, is also used.

The e caudata ([eː kau̯ˈdaːta], Latin for "tailed e", from Latin: cauda — "tail"; sometimes also called the e cedilla, hooked e, or looped e) is a modified form of the letter E that is usually graphically represented in printed text as E with ogonek (ę) but has a distinct history of usage. It was used in Latin from as early as the sixth century to represent the vowel also written ae or æ. In Old Gaelic texts from the 13th century, it represented an ea ligature.

== Medieval Latin ==
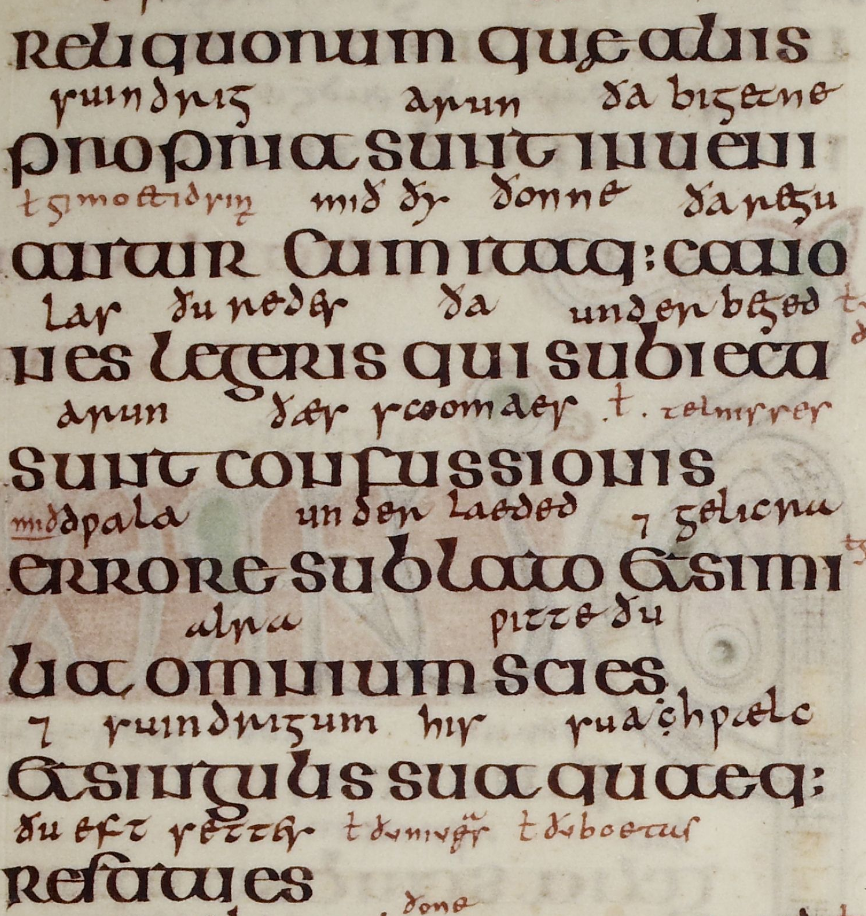
Part of the Lindisfarne Gospels, written around 700. An e caudata with a loop-shaped diacritic is used in the first line: "reliquorum quę aliis". The ae is also written as two separate letters in the second-to-last line: "& singulis sua quaeq[ue]".

The use of the e caudata in medieval Latin manuscripts, like the use of the ligature æ, was a transitional stage in the gradual change from representing the diphthongal ae with the separate letters ae, as it was written throughout antiquity, to representing it with the letter e. The diphthong had been pronounced as [ae̯] in the classical Latin of the late Roman Republic and early to middle Empire, but at some point between the second half of the 2nd century and the beginning of the 4th century AD, its pronunciation changed to [ɛ], so that it was indistinguishable from the short e in the pronunciation of the late Empire and the Middle Ages; indeed, medieval scribes sometimes hypercorrected by representing with ae, æ, or ę what in classical Latin had been a monophthongal e.

Graphically, e caudata probably originated as a modified form of the ligature æ with only the lower loop of the a, but not its upper arc, drawn and attached to the e; in medieval manuscripts the diacritic below the e is sometimes drawn as a small loop, similar in shape to the loop of an a, rather than resembling an ogonek. E caudata-like diacritics were also sometimes used on ligatures including an ae; for instance, the letters aet were sometimes represented by an ampersand with a loop or hook under it, or the letters quae by the abbreviation for que with a loop or hook under it.

The e caudata first appears in a few uncial and half uncial manuscripts of the 6th century AD and was first used widely in 7th century Italian and Spanish uncial manuscripts; its use spread to Germany and the British Isles in the late 7th and early 8th centuries and to France in the late 8th century. In manuscripts of the 7th and 8th centuries, ae, æ, and ę are all common. By the 10th century the e caudata had mostly replaced the digraph ae, and it remained the most common way of representing the diphthongal ae until the 12th century. However, its use remained uneven, as it was used less frequently in texts which used fewer abbreviations for the sake of greater clarity or formality, such as those written in Carolingian minuscule. In the 12th century, the e caudata started to be replaced by the plain e, which from then until the Renaissance remained the most common way of representing the diphthongal ae in manuscripts.

== Renaissance Latin ==
In the Renaissance, the e caudata, along with the ligature æ and the digraph ae, was reintroduced by humanists as part of an attempt to return to a more classical writing system, since they believed that the 11th and 12th century manuscripts they read were actually ancient Roman. The e caudata was introduced on this basis by Coluccio Salutati and was used frequently in humanist minuscule and occasionally in Gothic script during the Renaissance.

== Other languages ==
In Middle and Early Modern Irish manuscripts, and in unnormalised transcriptions of them, e caudata is used for e, ae, and ea.

In Old Norse manuscripts, e caudata was used for both short and long versions of /æ/. In a few texts in Old Norse, it represents short /æ/, the result of i-mutation of Proto-Germanic */a/, and contrasts with e, which represents Proto-Germanic */e/. However, because these two vowels eventually merged to /e/ in the written varieties of Old Norse, they are commonly both written as e.
