= Ӕ (Cyrillic) =

Cyrillic letter used for /ɐ/ in Ossetian

Cyrillic ligature AE
- Ӕ ӕ

Usage
- Writing system: Cyrillic
- Type: Alphabetic
- Sound values: [ɐ], [æ], [ʌ]

History
- Development: АЕ ае: Ӕ ӕ

Ae (Ӕ ӕ; italics: Ӕ ӕ) is a letter of the Cyrillic script, used exclusively in the Ossetian language to represent a near-open central vowel /ɐ/ in the Iron dialect and an open-mid back unrounded vowel /ʌ/ in the Digor dialect; both vowels are similar to the pronunciation of ⟨u⟩ in English "up". Its ISO 9 transliteration is ⟨æ⟩ but some transliteration schemes may render it as ⟨ä⟩. It is homoglyphic with the Latin script letter Æ (Æ æ Æ æ).

== History ==
The letter was first used in Anders Johan Sjögren's Ossetian Cyrillic alphabet in 1844 and appeared first in fiction and poetry books published at the beginning of the 20th century. It was preserved during the shift to a Latin alphabet and the reversion to a Cyrillic alphabet. It is one of the most common letters in the Ossetian language.

The letter was also found in the Lezgin alphabets of 1871 and 1911, the 1892 Dargwa alphabet and the 1875 Tabasaran alphabet.

== Computing codes ==
Character information
Preview	Ӕ		ӕ	
Unicode name	CYRILLIC CAPITAL LIGATURE A IE		CYRILLIC SMALL LIGATURE A IE	
Encodings	decimal	hex	dec	hex
Unicode	1236	U+04D4	1237	U+04D5
UTF-8	211 148	D3 94	211 149	D3 95
Numeric character reference	&#1236;	&#x4D4;	&#1237;	&#x4D5;

== See also ==
- Ligature (writing)
