= Geoffroy Tory =

French humanist and engraver (c. 1480–c. 1533)

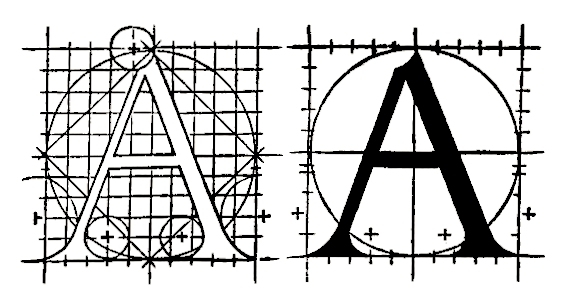
Initial letter A from Tory's book Champ-fleury, 1529

Geoffroy (or Geofroy) Tory (Latin: Godofredus Torinus; c. 1480 – before 14 October 1533) was a French humanist and an engraver, best known for adding accents on letters in French. His life's work has heavily influenced French publishing to this day.

== Life ==
Geoffroy Tory was born in Bourges in 1480, a decade after the first printing press arrived in Paris. He attended the local university, where he developed an interest in Latin literature. After completing his studies, Tory left Bourges for Italy, where he studied at two additional universities: first, the Sapienza at Rome, and then Bologna, where he studied under Philip Beroaldus, a well-known Latinist. The date of Tory's death in Paris is unknown, but was apparently between 1532, when he was made a librarian at the University of Paris, and 14 October 1533, per a lease describing his wife as a widow.

== Career ==
Around 1505, Tory left for Paris after completing his studies in Italy. He worked there as a bookbinder, editor of texts, and corrector for the press, serving such clients as Jean Grolier de Servières.

The first book Tory is known to have worked on is the Pomponius Mela, in 1508. This work helped him to develop a rather large reputation, despite his youth. In 1509 he became one of the youngest professors to teach at the Collège du Plessis. While Tory taught, he continued to work on his passion of bookbinding and editing.

Tory was known to be an extremely hard worker, often taking on large workloads. Sometime around 1511, he became a professor at Collège de Coqueret, and soon after at the Collège de Bourgogne, which at the time was a principal unit of the University of Paris. His lectures were said to draw large audiences.

Tory's interest in this period turned to the arts, especially painting and engraving. Several years after joining the Collège de Bourgogne, he resigned his post and moved to Italy so as to better study Italian art. Beyond his passing references to his travels in Champ Fleury, there is not much known of Tory at this time. He returned to Paris in 1518 and began regularly producing woodcuts, for which he gained a reputation among Parisian editors. It was during this same period that Tory took up selling books himself.

In 1514 Tory married Pierrette Le Hullin, the widow of a friend of his, fathering a daughter named Agnès. Tory doted on Agnès, teaching her Latin and about his life's work. Unfortunately, Agnès died from unknown reasons when she was nine, and Tory was long depressed over the death of his beloved daughter. When Tory published for the first time, his printer's mark was the urn that he kept Agnès' ashes in. In the months following her death, Tory wrote several pieces of poetry, claiming how lucky he was to have had such a daughter, and how her life influenced him. At the time, it was not uncommon for children to die at a young age, so it was unusual for Tory to have taken her death as hard as he did. It is said that her death influenced the creativity in his later works.

In 1524 he discovered The Book of Hours, and in 1525 Geoffroy published a copy, which became famous because he introduced there a type design that was free of the idea of printing which duplicated handwriting. This work also initiated the idea of book designing as an art in France.

In 1529 Tory published his own book, Champfleury, one of the most important and influential works of the time. It set a standard for French publishing that in many ways is still followed today. In the introduction to Champfleury, Tory is quoted as saying that there are three different kinds of men who corrupt the French language; the "skimmers of Latin", the "jokers", and the "slangers".

Gradually, he managed to acquire French texts to put into print, at a time when that was only done for Latin texts. For that purpose, he introduced the apostrophe, the acute accent and grave accent, and the cedilla. He wanted to reform French spelling to reflect its Latin roots.

In 1530 Tory became the official printer to King Francis I, and in 1532 he was made a librarian at the University of Paris.

== Works ==
=== Champfleury ===
Champfleury was written by Tory and published in 1529. It is divided into three books, and is concerned with the proper use of the French language, dealing with topics ranging from the elegance of the alphabet to the proper use of grammar. It was subtitled "The Art and Science of the Proportion of the Attic or Ancient Roman Letters, According to the Human Body and Face". Champfleury was not as stylized as The Book of Hours, but it gives great insight into the mind of Tory, his pedantic attitude and his meticulous devotion to the French Language. Tory used a square grid to describe the shape of letters, which is similar to the use of pixelation in modern-day typefaces. Although "Champfleury" roughly translates to "flowery fields", it is also a French idiom for "paradise".

=== The Book of Hours ===
The Book of Hours (French Livre d'heures), Tory's most famous work was completed in 1525. It is printed in a light Roman typeface. There are 17 known copies of the 1531 Book of Hours, which is the year that Tory published it. It contained sixteen full-page borders and thirteen large woodcuts. This version is the most famous to this day for breaking all the traditions of the time. The illustrations in the book are not perfect, as Tory did them all himself, and despite a passion for art, he did not have the talent of a master artist. The Book of Hours success led to Tory's being granted specific privileges by King François I to publish his own works.

=== Other works ===
- L'Adolescence clémentine et Briesve doctrine pour deuement escripre, 1533, referring to a collection of the works of Clément Marot
- Tres utile et compendieulx traicte de lart et science dorthographie gallicane, 1529

== Secondary works ==
- Auguste Bernard. Geofroy Tory, peintre et graveur, premier imprimeur royal, réformateur de l'orthographie et de la typographie sous François Ier... Deuxième édition. Paris : Tross, 1865.
  - See the first edition from 1857 here
- Claude Mediavilla. Histoire de la calligraphie française. Paris : 2006; pp. 134–136
