= Blattman =

Blattman is a surname. Notable people with the surname include:

- Chris Blattman (born 1974), American economist and political scientist
- Fabian Blattman (born 1958), Australian Paralympic athlete
- Seth Blattman, American politician

== See also ==
- Blattmann
