= Naess =

Næss, or Naess, is a Norwegian surname, and may refer to:

- Arne Lindtner Næss (born 1944), Norwegian actor
- Arne Næss (1912–2009), Norwegian philosopher
- Arne Næss (politician) (1925–2009), Norwegian politician
- Arne Næss, Jr. (1937–2004), Norwegian mountaineer and businessman
- Alfred Næss (1877–1955), Norwegian ice skater
- Alfred Næss (playwright) (1927–1997), Norwegian playwright and songwriter
- Atle Næss (born 1949), Norwegian writer
- Bente Haukland Næss (born 1954), Norwegian politician
- Erling Dekke Næss (1901–1993), Norwegian shipowner and businessman
- Dagfinn Næss (1934–2008), Norwegian boxer
- Jan Christopher Næss (born 1964), Norwegian writer
- Kate Næss (1938–1987), Norwegian poet
- Knut Næss (1916–2000), Norwegian professor of medicine
- Kristine Næss (born 1964), Norwegian writer
- Leif Næss (1923–1973), Norwegian rower
- Leona Naess (born 1974), singer and songwriter
- Mattis Næss (born 1973), Norwegian canoer
- Petter Næss (born 1960), Norwegian film director
- Randi Lindtner Næss (1905–2009), Norwegian singer
- Sigurd E. Naess (1886–1970), American architect who partnered with Charles Murphy (architect) to form Naess & Murphy
- Terje Næss (born 1968), Norwegian chef
- Tor Berntin Næss (born 1942), Norwegian ambassador
