= Gunn Elin Flakne =

Norwegian politician (born 1964)

Gunn Elin Flakne (born 8 January 1964) is a Norwegian politician for the Labour Party.

In the 2005, 2009 and 2013 elections she was elected as a deputy representative to the Parliament of Norway from Sør-Trøndelag. She hails from Tydal Municipality and has served as an elected member of Sør-Trøndelag county council.
