= Kim Søgaard =

Norwegian ice hockey player

Kim Søgaard (born May 16, 1964) is a former Norwegian ice hockey player. He was born in Oslo, Norway, and played for the club IL Sparta. He played for the Norwegian national ice hockey team at the 1988 and 1992 Winter Olympics.
