= Truls Kristiansen =

Norwegian ice hockey player

Personal information
- Born: 5 April 1964 (age 62) Asker, Norway

Sport
- Sport: Ice hockey

Truls Kristiansen (born 5 April 1964) is a Norwegian former ice hockey player. He was born in Asker, Norway and played for the club IF Frisk Asker. He played for the Norwegian national ice hockey team at the 1988 Winter Olympics.
