= Trygve Jacobsen =

Norwegian businessperson (1876–1964)

Trygve Jacobsen (16 November 1876 – 4 January 1964) was a Norwegian businessperson.

He was born in Kristiania as a son of wholesaler Severin Jacobsen (1840–1920) and landowner's daughter Anna Biermann (1845–1920). In 1901 he married Haldis Torgersen (1878–1936).

After finishing Kristiania Commerce School in 1894, he took commercial training posts in England and Germany. He then started a business career in the family company Severin Jacobsen. He became the company owner in 1920, at his father's death. In 1943, Trygve Jacobsen brought his sons Trygve, Jr. and Severin, Jr. on board as co-owners.

He was a board member of Oslo Handelsstands Forening from 1913 to 1915. In the 1930s he chaired Manufakturgrossistenes Landsforening from 1931 to 1933 and was consul-general for Czechoslovakia from 1932 to 1934. He was decorated as an Officer of the Order of the White Lion in 1934.

He was a supervisory council member of Forsikringsselskapet Norden, Morgenposten, and Holmenkolbanen (until 1955). He was also a control committee member of Grand Hotel. In the arts, he was a supervisory council member of Filharmonisk Selskap and deputy supervisory council member of Nationaltheatret. Jacobsen was also an art collector; his collections diminished by fire in 1955; an a cappella singer and freemason. He died in January 1964 and was buried in Ris.
