= Inge Andersen =

Norwegian sports coach and sports official

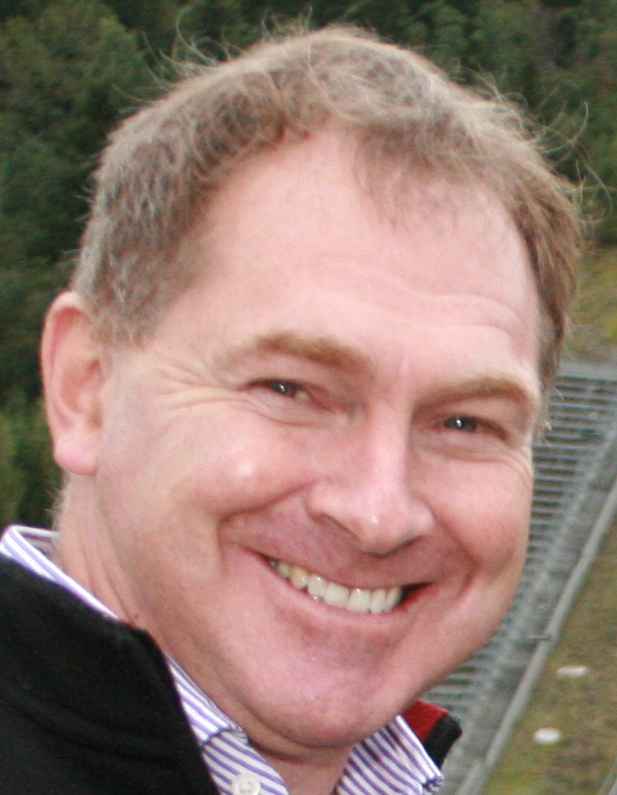
- Born: 22 May 1964 (age 61); Bergen, Norway
- Occupations: Sports coach Sports official

Inge Andersen (born 22 May 1964) is a Norwegian sports coach and sports official.

Andersen was born in Bergen. He coached the Switzerland national cross-country team from 1994 to 1996. From 1998 to 2001 he was assigned with the Norwegian Ski Federation as coach and manager for the Norway women's national cross-country team. He was appointed secretary-general for the Norwegian Olympic and Paralympic Committee and Confederation of Sports in 2004. He was sacked in March 2017.
