= Unni Olsbye =

Norwegian chemist (born 1964)

- Born: 9 March 1964 (age 62); Hamar, Norway
- Education: Norwegian Institute of Technology; University of Oslo
- Occupation: Chemist

Unni Olsbye (born 9 March 1964) is a Norwegian chemist. A professor at the University of Oslo, she has specialized in catalysts for the petrochemical industry.

== Career ==
Born in Hamar, Olsbye graduated in industrial chemistry from the Norwegian Institute of Technology in 1987, and as dr.scient. in organic chemistry from the University of Oslo in 1991. She was appointed professor at the Department of Chemistry at the University of Oslo in 2002. Her research focus has been catalytic reaction mechanisms in the petrochemical industry.

Olsbye was elected member of the learned society, Norwegian Academy of Technological Sciences from 2009, and member of the Norwegian Academy of Science and Letters from 2015.
