= Per Olav Tyldum =

Norwegian politician (born 1964)

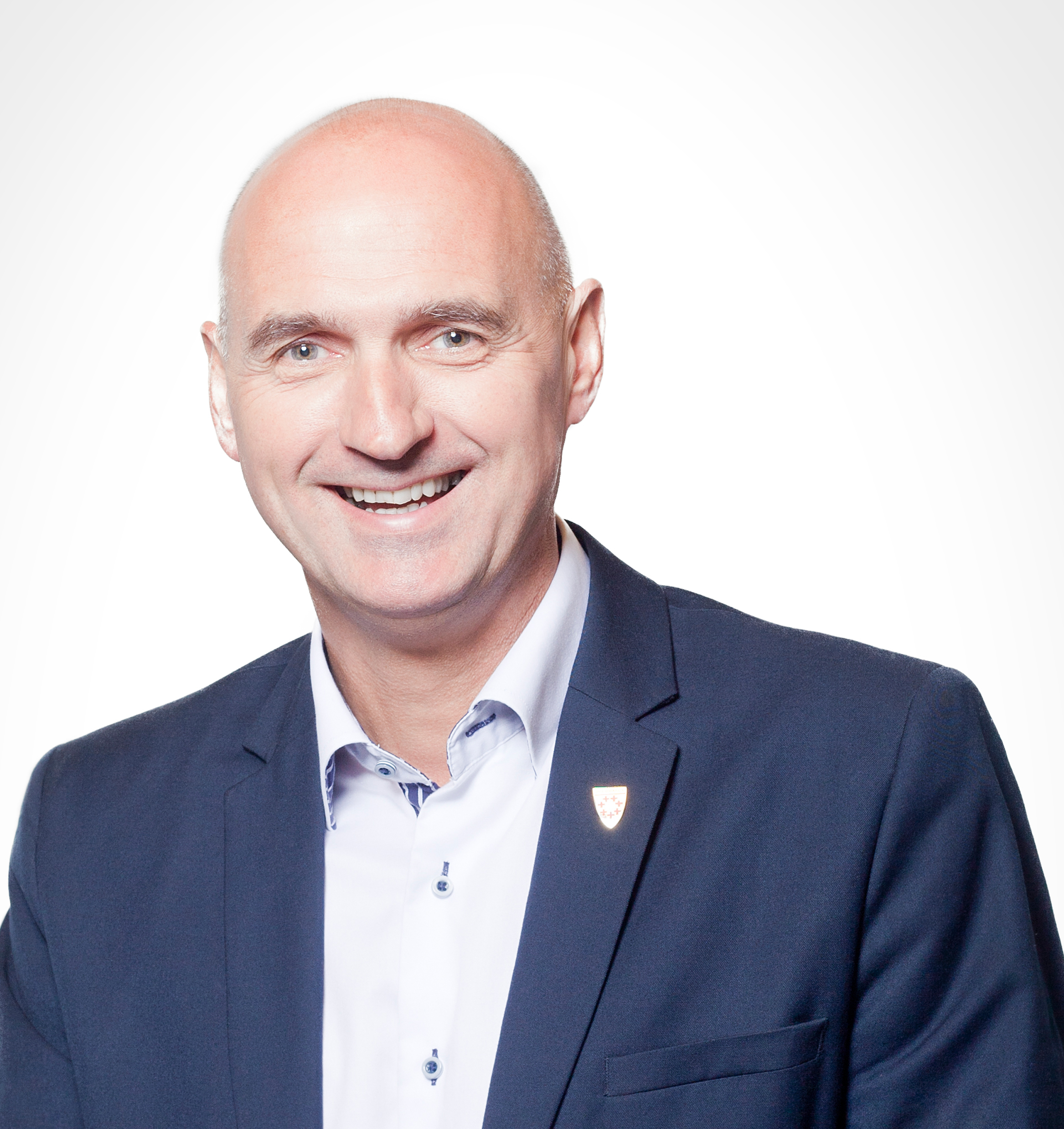
- Born: 24 April 1964 (age 62)
- Occupation: Politician
- Political party: Centre Party

Per Olav Tyldum (born 24 April 1964) is a Norwegian politician.

He was elected representative to the Storting from the constituency of Nord-Trøndelag for the period 2021–2025, for the Centre Party. Earlier, Tyldum was the mayor of Overhalla Municipality.
