= Anette Wiig Bryn =

Norwegian politician (born 1964)

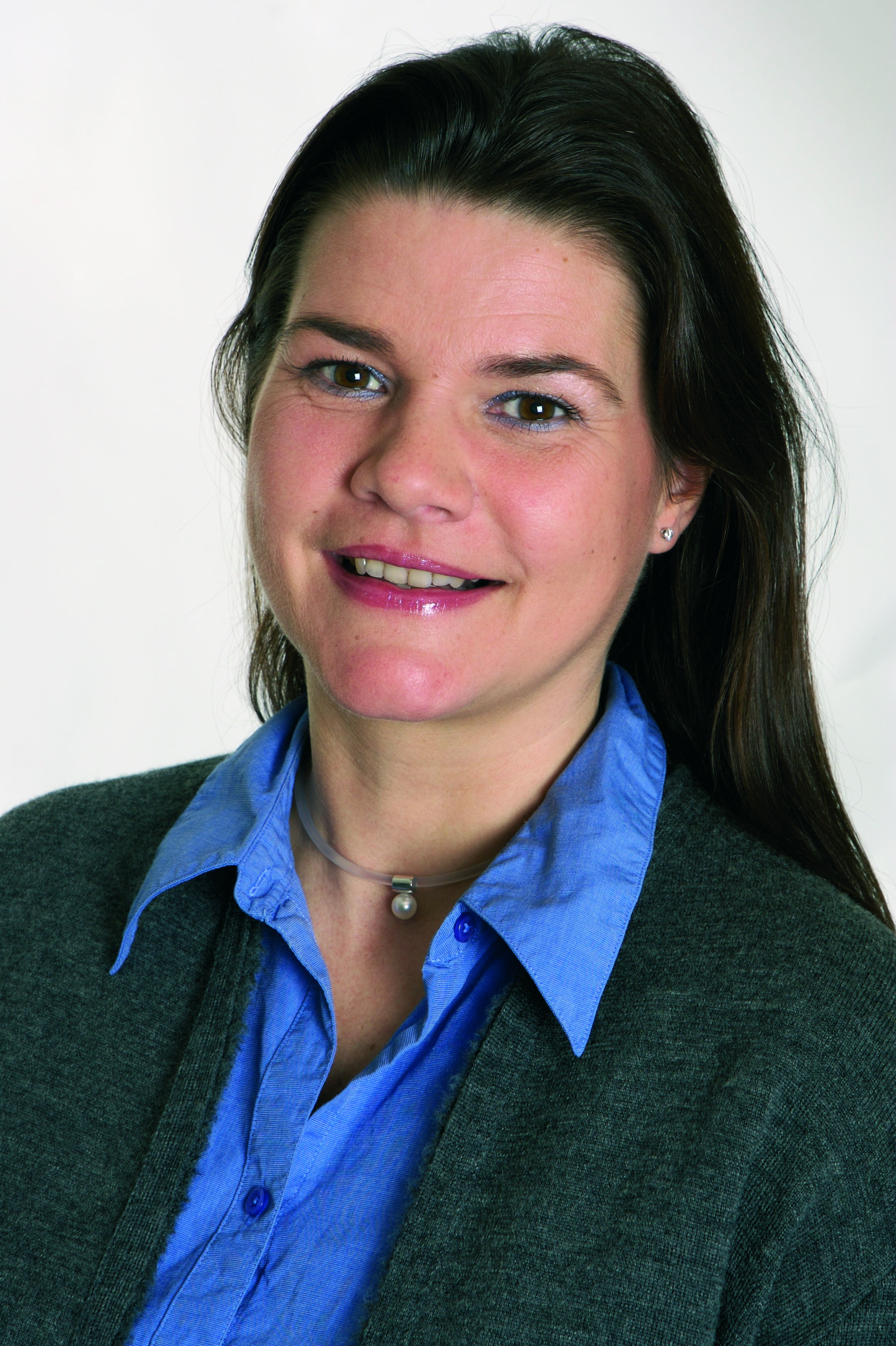
Anette Wiig Bryn

Anette Wiig Bryn (born 30 January 1964) is a Norwegian politician for the Progress Party.

In her younger days, she was a member of the Young Conservatives.

In 2004, she became city commissioner (byråd) of business and culture in the city government of Oslo.

She served in the position of deputy representative to the Norwegian Parliament from Oslo during the term 2005–2009. She was elected to Oslo city council in 2007, but was exempt due to her position as commissioner.

Political offices
Preceded by position created	Oslo City Commissioner of Business and Culture; 2004–present	Incumbent
