= Christian Wolther =

Norwegian artist, writer, playwright, director, philosopher and pedagogue

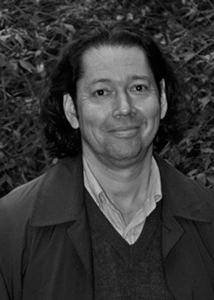
Christian Wolther in 2012

Christian Wolther (born in Oslo, 1964) is a Norwegian artist and writer, playwright, director, philosopher and pedagogue, and earlier in his career also theatre critic and art writer. Since 2005 he has been living in France and Thailand besides Norway. He has been active as a philosopher with his own YouTube channel since 2012. In January 2011, Christian Wolther had a major solo exhibition "UNTITLED OCEAN" in The National Gallery of Thailand.

== Work ==
As an artist he works mainly in an abstract, philosophical or phenomenological tradition and discipline, in painting, but also in photo and video. He uses text to a large extent, usually as the only medium of communication, on both canvases and in installations. Text and especially philosophical text can perhaps be seen as his main medium. Wolther works within many different disciplines.

In 2008 and 2009 he held the position of artist in residence and guest lecturer at Khon Kaen University, Thailand. In 2009 he had a solo exhibition "REFLECTIONS" at The Museum of Art and Culture, Khon Kaen University, Thailand. The review and interview in Bangkok Post ("Reflections on Modern Art: Norwegian artist discourses art/Buddhism dichotomy in new exhibition», on 19 February 2009) focused on a central element of the exhibition with a discussion of Wolther's perspective on certain aspects regarding the relationship between art production and practices and concepts of Buddhism.

As a playwright and director he has operated in areas of scenic minimalism with a clear presence of existential and cognitive philosophy, such as in the plays "Threshold" (Det Norske Teatret, Actor: Tom Tellefsen, Oslo 1994) and "Day Number Eight" (Black Box Teater, Actors: Kim Haugen and Kjetil Skøien, Oslo 1992). The review for "Threshold" in Morgenbladet in June 1994 was titled "More abstract than Beckett", and the review for "Day Number Eight" in Dagbladet in April 1992 was titled "Tableau in Black Box". In other plays, such as "Of This You Will Never Know" (performed at Volapuk Stiftelse, Oslo 1993) and "Aria Variata" (performance with the Norwegian dancer Monica Emilie Herstad, Oslo 1997) philosophical and existential investigations and introspection are set in a more direct Comical or humorous framework. Satire and cultural criticism has otherwise been obvious elements, such as in his contribution as a co-author among others, to the satire performance "In the ghetto" (Det Åpne Teater, Oslo 1996). Wolther has also published poetry and prose in two literary anthologies published by the Norwegian publishing house Aschehoug (Stemmer I Et Hus vol. I (1993) and vol. II (1996)), besides articles on art and theatre in Norwegian newspapers and magazines.

His later works, as a multimedia artist and as a writer, conveys a deeper reflection on language and knowledge itself. Language as a medium, and what it means to our conceptions that we interact with and attach to it, how it affects us and the cognitive process. Cultural criticism, language philosophy and the phenomenology of perception, are central elements of his main works.

Christian Wolther says in press material, interviews and in his catalogues that art should Transcend itself and become attitude and strategy within society and humanity, instead of being limited within the endless production of objects and concepts. "Art should be attitude and strategy because art as objects and concepts are not so philosophically valid or interesting anymore, and because art as an institutionalised practice, just seems to repeat itself."

"Art should be society, because society should be art. Art could be humanity, because humanity could be art." This is a main concept of Wolther and is presented on his website and in his last major catalogue. "Global world society needs the knowledge and the intellect and the resources of art, science and philosophy. To improve global world society is now more important than art. The intellectual and spiritual and esthetic resources of art and philosophy should influence society. Attitude and knowledge can be seen as a work of art in itself. The future of art is to make art more influential in society and politics. The future work of art could be society and humanity itself." These are quotations from the catalogue "UNTITLED OCEAN". How art can transcend itself and become more useful in global world society, has been a main concept in the later works of Christian Wolther.

== List of selected works ==
- 2011. UNTITLED OCEAN. Solo exhibition. The National Gallery of Thailand. Catalogue on 270 pages.
- 2009. REFLECTIONS. Solo exhibition. Museum of Art and Culture, Khon Kaen, Thailand. Catalogue on 200 pages.
- 2003. ARIA VARIATA. Film and videoworks, from Norway, France and Sri Lanka.
- 1996. THRESHOLD/ETERNITY HAS BEGUN. Theatre play, performance-art and art installation. MOT International Theatre Festival, Skopje, Macedonia.
- 1996. PERIISSEM NISI PERIISSEM. Performance-art and art installasjon. Paris, Oslo, Athens, Aarhus, Humlebaek.
- 1995. ETERNITY HAS BEGUN. Performance-art and art installation as stunt happening. The Living Art Museum, Reykjavik, Iceland.
- 1995. HAMLET/TRANSAVANTGARDE. Performance-art and art installation, with 20 young theatre students. Kalmar Slott, Sweden.
- 1994. THRESHOLD. Theatre play. The Norwegian Theatre, Festival of Dramatic Writing, Oslo Norway.
- 1992. DAY NUMBER EIGHT. Theatre play. Black Box Theatre, Oslo Norway.
