= Anita Orlund =

Norwegian politician (born 1964)

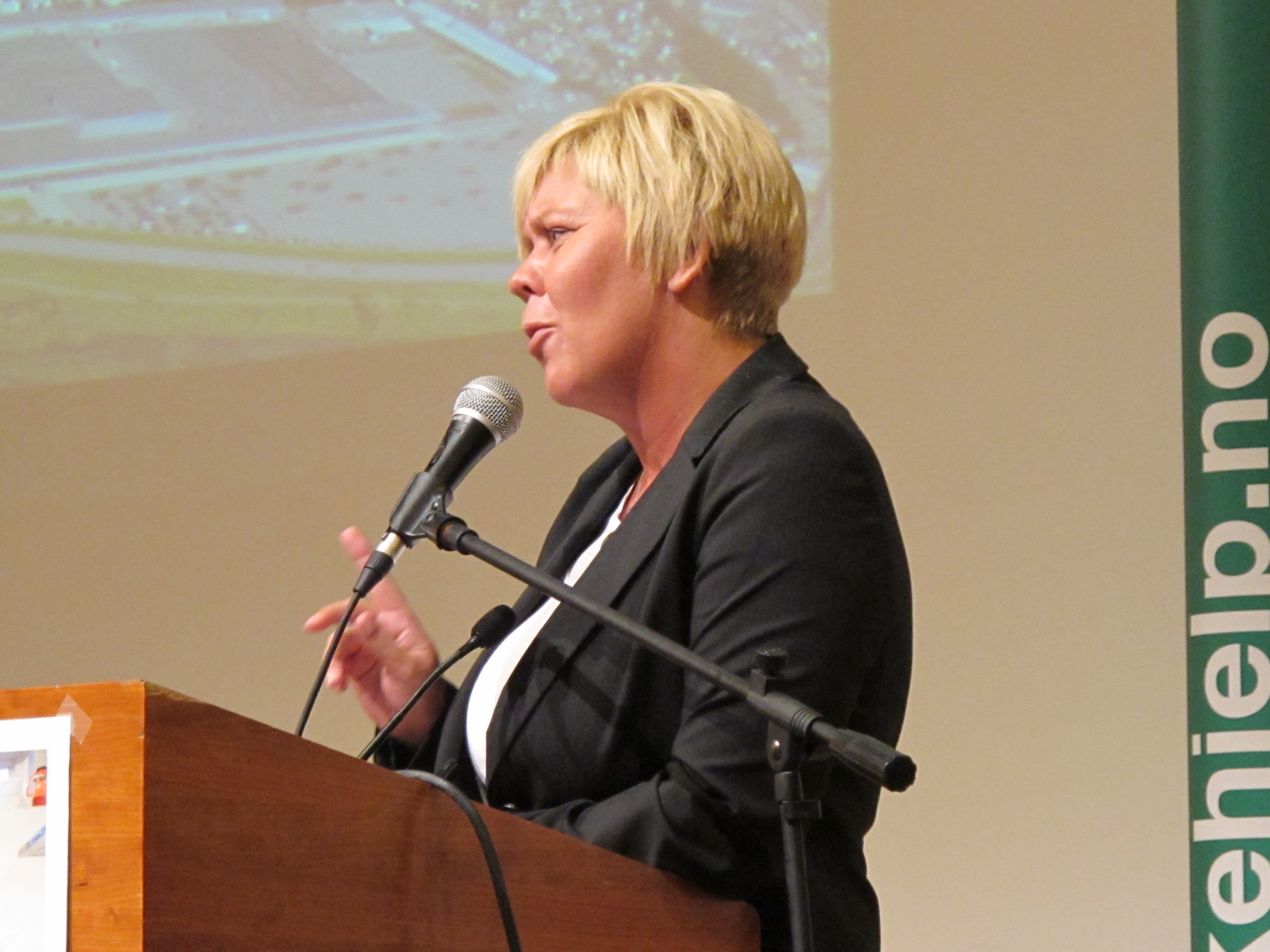
Anita Orlund.

Anita Orlund (born 7 September 1964) is a Norwegian politician for the Labour Party.

She served as a deputy representative to the Parliament of Norway from Akershus during the terms 1997–2001, 2001–2005, 2005–2009 and 2009–2013.

On the local level she was the mayor of Skedsmo from 2005 to 2011. She replaced Andreas Hamnes who was forced to resign following the Nedre Romerike Vannverk scandal. Since 2012 she is the managing director of Kunnskapsbyen Lillestrøm.
