= Tom Roger Aadland =

Norwegian lyricist and musician

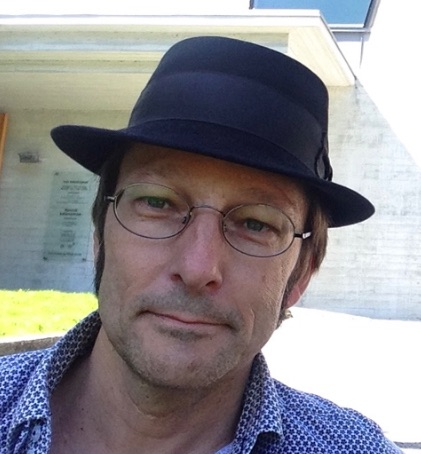
- Born: 26 April 1964 (age 61); Haugesund, Norway
- Occupation: Musician

Tom Roger Aadland (born 26 April 1964) is a Norwegian lyricist and musician.

== Personal life ==
Born in Haugesund on 26 April 1964, Aadland grew up in the village of Vikebygd in Vindafjord Municipality. He graduated in classical guitar and instrumental pedagogy from Østlandets Musikkonservatorium in 1987. He resides in Oslo.

== Career ==
Aadland made his album debut in 2007 with Obviously Embraced, recorded in Ireland. His 2009-album Blod på spora contained songs such as "Vikla inn i blått" and "Du gjer meg einsam når du dreg", which were translations of lyrics by Bob Dylan into Nynorsk language. Further albums are Det du aldri sa (2011), Fløyel og stål (2012), and Rapport frå eit grensehotell (2015), with his own lyrics. The album Blondt i blondt from 2016 was again a Nynorsk version of Dylan's songs, and earned him a radio award. In 2021 he issued the album Motgift.

He was co-author of the book Bob Dylan. Mannen, myten og musikken from 2011, and has written lyrics for the rock band Hellbillies and the folk music band Vamp. His Dylan translations were basis for the theatre concert Vikla inn i blått – Dylan på nynorsk staged at Det Norske Teatret in 2020, directed by Eirik Stubø.
