= Jarle Friis =

Norwegian ice hockey player (born 1964)

Jarle Friis (born 2 November 1964) is a former Norwegian ice hockey player. He was born in Oslo, Norway. He played for the Norwegian national ice hockey team at the 1988 and 1992 Winter Olympics.
