= Jarl Eriksen =

Norwegian ice hockey player

Jarl Eriksen (born 15 January 1964) is a former Norwegian ice hockey player. He was born in Oslo, Norway. He played for the Norwegian national ice hockey team at the 1988 Winter Olympics.
