= Mette Andersson =

Norwegian sociologist

Mette Andersson (born 1964) is a Norwegian sociologist. She is Professor of Sociology at the University of Bergen. Her fields of expertise are cultural and political sociology, especially migration, ethnicity and racism, identity and identity politics, social movements, sociology of sport, transnationality and religion.

She has formerly worked as a researcher at Telemark Research Institute, and as a senior researcher at the Rokkan Centre. She was appointed associate professor of sociology at the University of Bergen in 2006, and became Professor of Sociology in 2009. She was external reviewer for the European Science Foundation from 2008 to 2009. She has been a visiting scholar at the Centre for Urban and Community studies, Goldsmiths College, University of London, and the Department of Sociology, Yale University.

== Selected publications ==
- Vassenden, A. & Andersson, M. 2011. “Whiteness, non-whiteness and ‘faith information control’: religion among young people in Grønland, Oslo”, Ethnic and Racial Studies vol. 34(4): 574–593.
- Andersson, M. 2011. "Global integration in the Nation: The Emergence of Non-White Athletes and Anti-Racist Initiatives in Norwegian Elite Sport". pp. 150–166 in Sport and Challenges to Racism, edited by Jonathon Long and Karl Spracklen. Hampshire: Palgrave Macmillan.
- Vassenden, A. and Andersson, M. 2010. "When an image becomes sacred: photo-elicitation with images of holy books". Visual Studies Vol. 25(2): 149–161.
- Andersson, M. 2010. "The social imaginary of first generation Europeans", Social Identities vol. 16(1): 3-21.
- Andersson, M. 2009. "De todos blancos a la mayoría blanca. Migraciones deportivas e integración en el fútbol noruego". In Llopis-Goig, R. (ed.): Fútbol postnacional. Transformaciones sociales y culturales del 'deporte global' en Europa y América Latina. Barcelona: Editorial Anthropos.
- Andersson, M. 2008. Flerfarget idrett. Nasjonalitet, migrasjon og minoritet. [Multicolored sport. Nationality, migration and minority] Bergen: Fagbokforlaget. ISBN 9788245007213
- Andersson, M. 2007. "Corporate multiculturalism bounces across the Atlantic. The introduction of semi-professional basketball in Norway". International Journal of Sport Management and Marketing, Vol. 2, No. 1-2: 2–15.
- Andersson, M. 2007. "Migrasjon som utfordring. Kritikk av metodologisk nasjonalisme". [Migration as challenge. Critique of methodological nationalisme]. S. 53-79 i Grenser for Kultur? Perspektiver fra norsk minoritetsforskning, edited by Øivind Fuglerud og Thomas Hylland Eriksen. Oslo: Pax.
- Andersson, M. 2007. 'The relevance of the Black Atlantic in contemporary sport. Racial imaginaries in Norway', International Review for the Sociology of Sport, 42(1): 63–79. 2008–2011.
- Andersson, M. 2006. "Ethnic Entrepreneurs: identity politics among ethnic Pakistani students in Norway". I What happens When a Society is Diverse? Exploring Multidimensional Identities, redigert av Y.G. Lithman og H. Sicakkan. New York: Edwin Mellen Press.
- Andersson, M. 2006. "Colonialisation of Norwegian Space: Identity Politics in the Streets of Oslo in the 1990s". Norsk tidsskrift for migrasjonsforskning, nr. 1/2006: 6-24.
- Andersson, M., Lithman, Y.G. and Sernhede, O. (eds). 2005. Youth, Otherness and the Plural City: Modes of Belonging and Social Life. Göteborg: Daidalos.
- Andersson, M. 2005. "Individualized and Collectivized Bases for Migrant Youth Identity Work". P. 27–52 in Youth, Otherness and the Plural City: Modes of Belonging and Social Life, edited by M. Andersson, Y.G. Lithman and O. Sernhede. Göteborg: Daidalos.
- Andersson, M. 2005. Urban Multi-Culture in Norway: Identity Formation among Immigrant Youth. New York: Edwin Mellen Press.
- Andersson, M. 2004. "Identitetsarbeid og identitetspolitikk". Sosiologi iag, vol. 34, no. 3/2004: 55–82.
- Andersson, M. 2003. "Immigrant youth and the dynamics of marginalization". Young, vol.11, no. 1: 74–89.
- Andersson, M. 2002. "Identity Work in Sports. Ethnic Minority Youth, Norwegian Macro-debates and the Role Model Aspect". Journal of International Migration and Integration, vol. 3, no. 1: 83–107.
- Andersson, M. 2001."Ethnic Entrepreneurs - Identity Work as Negotiations of Gender, Ethnicity and Generation". I Forestillinger om "den andre". Images of Otherness, edited by L.A. Ytrehus. Kristiansand: Høyskoleforlaget.
- Andersson, M. 1999. "‘Etniske entreprenører' - Utdanning som mål, symbol og motstand". I Kjønn og utdanning i informasjonssamfunnet. Festskrift til Hildur Ve, edited by G.Birkelund, A.K. Broch-Due & A.Nilsen. Bergen: Sosiologisk institutt, UiB.
- Andersson, M. 1999. "All five fingers are not the same". Identity work among ethnic minority youth in an urban Norwegian context. University of Bergen, 1999.
- Andersson, M. 1996. "Understanding the «Other» - Biographical interviews in or without context?". I: Likeverdighet og utestengning - forskningsmessige utfordringer, redigert av J.C.Knudsen. Nordisk Ministerråd: Tema Nord 1996: 634.
