= Geir Elsebutangen =

Norwegian politician (born 1964)

- Born: 1964 (age 61–62)
- Occupation: Politician

Geir Elsebutangen (born 3 January 1964) is a Norwegian politician for the Conservative Party.

He has served as an elected member of Skien city council. In the 2013 election he was elected as a deputy representative to the Parliament of Norway from Telemark.

Since 2013 he works as the chief executive officer of Kragerø Energi.
