= Kristine Næss =

Norwegian writer (born 1964)

Kristine Næss (born 10 May 1964) is a Norwegian writer.

She was born in Oslo. Novels include Sonja (1998), Rita blir forfatter (2002) and Hannahs historie med Heddy (2008). She has also issued the poetry collection Obladi (1996) and the story collection Stridig (2004).
