= Trond Henry Blattmann =

Norwegian politician (born 1964)

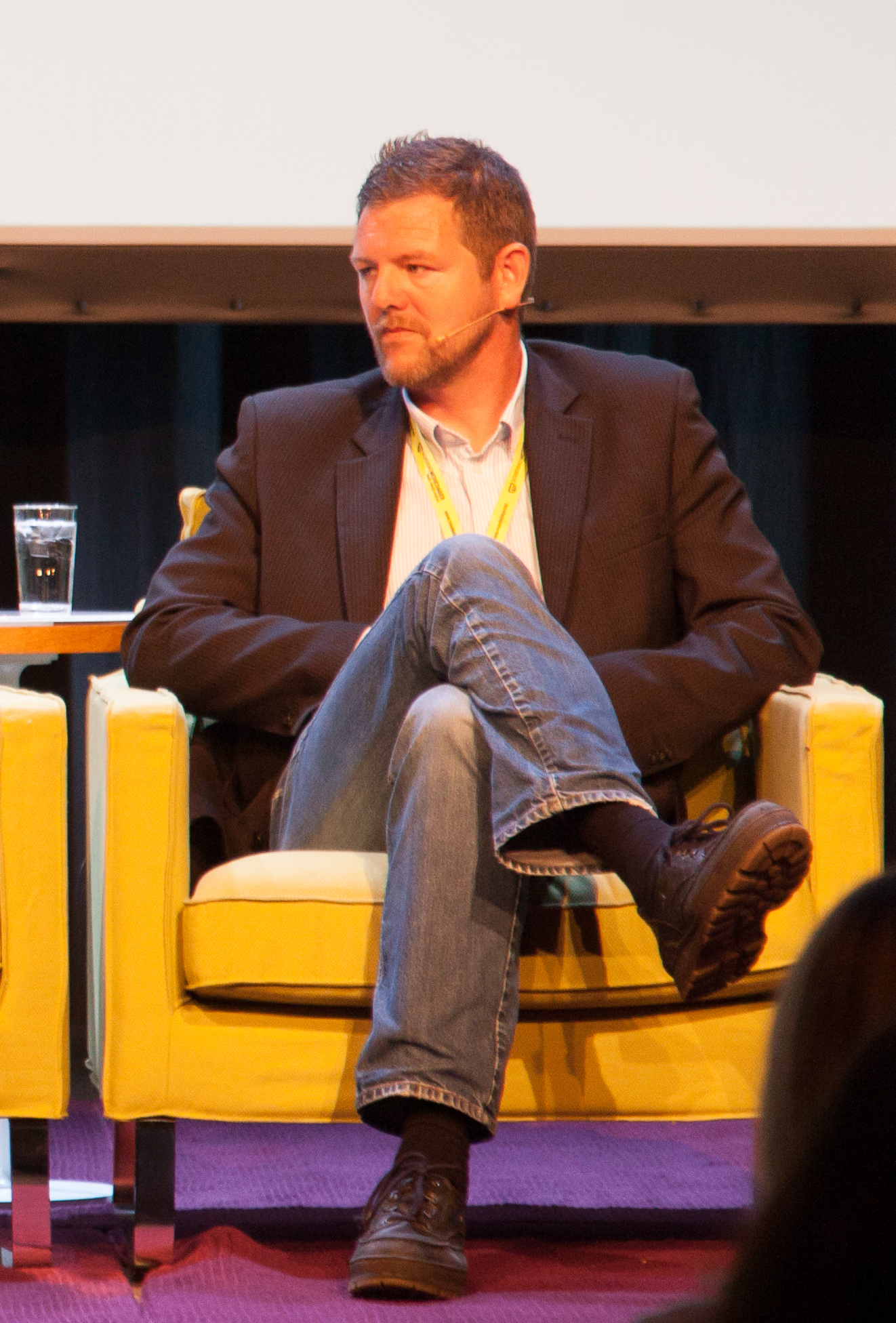
Trond Henry Blattmann, 2012

Trond Henry Blattmann (born 23 August 1964) is a Norwegian politician for the Labour Party.

From 2009 to 2011 he was a part of Stoltenberg's Second Cabinet as a political adviser in the Ministry of Government Administration, Reform and Church Affairs. He served as a deputy representative to the Parliament of Norway from Vest-Agder during the term 2013–2017.

Locally, Blattmann has been a caucus leader in Kristiansand city council. He is a son of Aud Blattmann. He lost a son in the 2011 Utøya shooting and became leader of the National Support Group for the victims.
