= Nina Mjøberg =

Norwegian politician (born 1964)

Nina Mjøberg (born 18 April 1964) is a Norwegian politician for the Labour Party.

She served as a deputy representative to the Parliament of Norway from Buskerud during the terms 1989–1993, 2005–2009 and 2009–2013.

On the local level, she is a former deputy mayor of Modum.
