= Â =

Latin letter A with circumflex

- Â â

Usage
- Writing system: Latin script
- Type: Alphabetic
- Language of origin: French language
- Sound values: [ɑ̃]; [ɑ]; [ɨ]; [ɔː]; [aː]; [ʔa˥]; [ɐ̃]; [ɜ̃]; [ə̃]; [ʕ]; [ɑ̯] [a]; [ɐ]; [ɨ]; [áː]
- In Unicode: U+00E2

History
- Development: 𓃾: Α α; 𐌀; A a; Â â
- Time period: c. 1500s – present
- Descendants: Ấ; Ậ; Ầ; Ẩ
- Sisters: Æ; Ä; Â; Ɑ; Ʌ; Ɐ; ª; Å; ₳; @; Ⓐ ⓐ ⒜; 🅰

Other
- Writing direction: Left-to-right

Â, â (a-circumflex) is a letter of the Inari Sami, Skolt Sami, Romanian, Vietnamese and Mizo alphabets. This letter also appears in French, Friulian, Frisian, Portuguese, Turkish, Walloon, and Welsh languages as a variant of the letter "a". It is included in some romanization systems for Khmer, Persian, Balinese, Sasak, Russian, and Ukrainian.

== Berber languages ==
"â" can be used in Berber Latin alphabet to represent [ʕ].

== Emilian-Romagnol ==
Â is used to represent [aː] in Emilian dialects, as in Bolognese câna [kaːna] "cane".

== Faroese ==
Johan Henrik Schrøter, who translated the Gospel of Matthew into Faroese in 1823, used â to denote a non-syllabic a, as in the following example:

| Schrøter 1817 | Modern Faroese |
|---|---|
| Brinhlid situr uj gjiltan Stouli, Teâ hit veâna Vujv, Drevur hoon Sjúra eâv Nordlondun; Uj Hildarhaj tiil sujn. | Brynhild situr í gyltum stóli, tað hitt væna vív, dregur hon Sjúrða av Norðlondum í Hildarheið til sín. |

Â is not used in modern Faroese, however.

== French ==
⟨â⟩, in the French language, is used as the letter ⟨a⟩ with a circumflex accent. It is a remnant of Old French, where the vowel was followed, with some exceptions, by the consonant ⟨s⟩. For example, the modern form bâton (English: stick) comes from the Old French baston. Phonetically, ⟨â⟩ is traditionally pronounced as /ɑ/, but is nowadays rarely distinguished from /a/ in many dialects such as in Parisian French. However, the traditional ⟨â⟩ is still pronounced this way in Québecois French or Canadian French, which is known to resemble the phonetics of the Old French accent, and is widely spoken by French Canadians, the majority of whom live in the province of Québec.

In Maghreb French, ⟨â⟩ is used to transcribe the Arabic consonant ⟨ع⟩ /ʕ/, whose pronunciation is close to a non-syllabic [ɑ̯].

== Friulian ==
Â is used to represent the /ɑː/ sound.

== Inari Sami ==
Â is used to represent the /ɐ/ sound.

== Italian ==
Â is occasionally used to represent the sound /aː/ in words like amâr, a poetic contraction of amarono (they loved).

== Khmer ==
Â is used in the UNGEGN romanization system to represent the /ɑː/ sound in Khmer.

== Persian ==
Â is used in the romanization of Persian to represent the sound /ɒ/ in words such as Fârs.

== Portuguese ==
In Portuguese, â is used to mark a stressed /ɐ/ in words whose stressed syllable is nasal and in an unpredictable location within the word, as in "lâmina" (blade) and "âmbar" (amber). Where the location of the stressed syllable is predictable, such as in "ando" (I walk), the circumflex accent is not used. Â /ɐ/ contrasts with á, pronounced /a/.

== Romanian ==
Â is the 3rd letter of the Romanian alphabet and represents /ɨ/, which is also represented in Romanian as letter î. The difference between the two is that â is used in the middle of the word, as in "România", while î is used at the beginning and at the ends: "înțelegere" (understanding), "a urî" (to hate). A compound word starting with the letter î will retain it, even if it goes in the middle of the word: compare "înțelegere" (understanding) with "neînțelegere" (misunderstanding). However, if a suffix is added, the î changes into â, as in the example: "a urî" (to hate), "urât" (hated). Another grapheme <a> in Romanian with diacritic is <ă>.

== Russian ==
Â is used in the ISO 9:1995 system of Russian transliteration as the letter Я.

== Serbo-Croatian ==
In all standard varieties of Serbo-Croatian, "â" is not a letter but simply an "a" with the circumflex that denotes vowel length. It is used only occasionally and then disambiguates homographs, which differ only by syllable length. That is most common in the plural genitive case and so it is also called "genitive sign": "Ja sam sâm" (English: I am alone).

== Sicilian ==
Â is used to represent [aː] in Sicilian, as in the preposition pâ [paː] "for the".

== Turkish ==
Â is used to indicate the consonant before "a" is palatalized, as in "kâr" (profit). It is also used to indicate /aː/ in words for which the long vowel changes the meaning, as in "adet" (pieces) and "âdet" (tradition) / "hala" (aunt) and "hâlâ" (still).

In religious contexts, â (like î and û) is sometimes used to correspond to Arabic long vowels (Alâeddîn, Sâd Sûresî, etc.)

== Ukrainian ==
Â is used in the ISO 9:1995 system of Ukrainian transliteration to represent the letter Я.

== Vietnamese ==
Â is the 3rd letter of the Vietnamese alphabet and represents /ɜ/. â /ɜ/ is a higher vowel than plain a /ɑ/. In Vietnamese phonology, diacritics can be added to form five forms to represent five tones of â:

- Ầ ầ
- Ẩ ẩ
- Ẫ ẫ
- Ấ ấ
- Ậ ậ

== Welsh ==
In Welsh, â is used to represent long stressed a [aː] when, without the circumflex, the vowel would be pronounced as short [a], e.g., âr [aːr] "arable", as opposed to ar [ar] "on"; or gwâr [ɡwaːr] "civilised, humane", rather than gwar [ɡwar] "nape of the neck". It is often found in final syllables where two adjacent a letters combine to produce a long stressed vowel. This commonly happens when a verb stem ending in stressed a combines with the nominalising suffix -ad, as in caniata- + -ad giving caniatâd [kanjaˈtaːd] "permission", and also when a singular noun ending in a receives the plural suffix -au, as in drama + -au becoming dramâu [draˈmaɨ, draˈmai] "dramas, plays". It is also useful in writing borrowed words with final stress, e.g. brigâd [brɪˈɡaːd] "brigade".

A circumflex is also used in the word â, which is both a preposition, meaning "with, by means of, as", and the third person non-past singular of the verbal noun mynd, "go". This distinguishes it in writing from the similarly pronounced a, meaning "and; whether; who, which, that".

== In Unicode ==
- U+00C2 Â LATIN CAPITAL LETTER A WITH CIRCUMFLEX
- U+00E2 â LATIN SMALL LETTER A WITH CIRCUMFLEX

== Windows Alt Key codes ==
| Â | Alt | + | 0194 |
| â | Alt | + | 0226 |

== TeX and LaTeX ==
Â and â are obtained by the commands \^A and \^a.

== In encoding mismatches ==
In a common example of mojibake, the capital Â is sometimes seen on webpages when the page has been encoded in UTF-8 and decoded using ISO 8859-1 or Windows-1252, two encodings which are commonly referred to as Western or Western European. In UTF-8, the copyright symbol (©) is encoded with the hexadecimal bytes C2 A9. In the older Western encoding standards, however, the © symbol is simply A9. If a browser is given the bytes C2 A9, intended to display © in UTF-8, but is led to parse the bytes according to one of the Western encodings, it will interpret the bytes C2 A9 as two separate characters. C2 corresponds to Â, as seen in the chart above, and A9 devolves to the © symbol, so the result seen by the person reading the page is Â©—that is, the correct © symbol but with an Â prepended. Characters with Unicode code points from A0 to BF have UTF-8 encodings that are identical to their Western encodings but preceded by the byte C2, so that when any of these characters is encoded in UTF-8 and viewed in a Western encoding, an Â will appear before it.

== See also ==
- Circumflex
