= Ã =

Latin letter A with tilde

A with tilde
- Ã ã

Usage
- Writing system: Latin script
- Language of origin: Portuguese; Kashubian; Silesian; Guaraní; Taa; Aromanian; Vietnamese; Greenlandic (obsolete); Hindi; Tedaga
- In Unicode: U+00C3, U+00E3

History
- Time period: 16th century to present

Other
- Writing direction: Left-to-right

A with tilde (majuscule: Ã, minuscule: ã) is a letter of the Latin alphabet formed by addition of the tilde diacritic over the letter A. It is used in Portuguese, Kashubian, Silesian, Guaraní, Aromanian, Taa, and Vietnamese. In the past, it was also used in Greenlandic.

== Usage ==
In Portuguese, it represents a nasal near-open central vowel ([ɐ̃]), though it varies from near-open to mid-central vowel according to dialect. It also appears as a part of the diphthongs ãe, pronounced as /ɐ̃j̃/, and ão, pronounced as /ɐ̃w̃/.

In Kashubian, the letter is generally pronounced as nasalized open front unrounded vowel ([ã]). In the dialect present in counties of Puck and Wejherowo, it is pronounced as nasalized open-mid front unrounded vowel ([ɛ̃]). It is the 3rd letter of the Kashubian alphabet.

In Silesian, the letter represents a wide assortment of sounds and clusters, depending on region and dialect. In the northern and central parts of Upper Silesia pronounced broadly as a nasalized or unnasalized open front unrounded vowel ([ã] or [a]). In Międzybórz pronounced as a close-mid central unrounded vowel ([ɘ]) and in the Lach dialects - a close back unrounded vowel ([u]). The letter represents the clusters /am/ in Racibórz and the village Paczyna, /ɘm/ in the Cieszyn dialect, and /ɛm/ in the Jabłonków dialect.

In Guaraní and Taa, it is pronounced as nasalized open front unrounded vowel ([ã]).

In Aromanian, it is pronounced as mid-central vowel ([ə]) or close central unrounded vowel ([ɨ]).

In Vietnamese, it is pronounced as long open front unrounded vowel ([aː]) in a high breaking-rising tone.

The letter is also used in the Latin script of the Teda language in Chad and Libya.

It is also used as a phonetic symbol in the International Phonetic Alphabet, where its lower case (ã), represents the nasalized open front unrounded vowel.

Formerly, the letter was also used in Greenlandic to represent long open front unrounded vowel ([aː]) next to a geminated consonant, but now it is replaced with Aa.

The letter is also used in Belter Creole, a constructed language made by Nick Farmer for The Expanse television sci-fi series. In the language, it represents the nasalized near-open front unrounded vowel ([æ̃]) sound, for example in the word shãsa, which means chance.

== Encoding ==
Character information
Preview	Ã		ã	
Unicode name	LATIN CAPITAL LETTER A WITH TILDE		LATIN SMALL LETTER A WITH TILDE	
Encodings	decimal	hex	dec	hex
Unicode	195	U+00C3	227	U+00E3
UTF-8	195 131	C3 83	195 163	C3 A3
Numeric character reference	&#195;	&#xC3;	&#227;	&#xE3;
Named character reference	&Atilde;		&atilde;	
