= Venlo dialect =

Dialect of Limburgish in the Netherlands

- Venloos
- Pronunciation: [ˈvɛnloːs]
- Native to: Netherlands
- Region: Venlo
- Language family: Indo-European: Germanic; West Germanic; Weser–Rhine Germanic; Low Franconian; Limburgish; Venlo dialect

Language codes
- ISO 639-3: –
- Glottolog: None

Venlo dialect (Dutch and Limburgish: Venloos) is the city dialect and a variant of Limburgish spoken in the Dutch city of Venlo alongside the Dutch language (with which it is not mutually intelligible). It belongs to a group of transitional dialects between Kleverlandish and East Limburgish spoken in the northern part of Netherlands Limburg. That group of dialects is also known by its Dutch name Mich-kwartier ("Mich area", based on the usage of mich /ˈmex/ instead of the Brabantian mij /ˈmɛj/ as the accusative form of ik 'I').

== Phonology ==
=== Vowels ===
Vowel phonemes
| | | Front | | | | Central | | Back | |
| | | unrounded | | rounded | | Central | | Back | |
| | | short | long | short | long | short | long | short | long |
|---|---|---|---|---|---|---|---|---|---|
| Close | | i ⟨ie⟩ | iː ⟨iê⟩ | y ⟨uu⟩ | yː ⟨uû⟩ | | | u ⟨oe⟩ | uː ⟨oê⟩ |
| Close-mid | | e ⟨i⟩ | eː ⟨ee⟩ | ø ⟨u⟩ | øː ⟨eu⟩ | ə ⟨e⟩ | | o ⟨ó⟩ | oː ⟨oo⟩ |
| Open-mid | | ɛ ⟨e⟩ | ɛː ⟨ae⟩ | œ ⟨ö⟩ | œː ⟨äö⟩ | ə ⟨e⟩ | | ɒ ⟨o⟩ | ɒː ⟨ao⟩ |
| Open | | | | | | | aː ⟨aa⟩ | ɑ ⟨a⟩ | |
| Diphthongs | closing | ɛj œj ɔw | | | | | | | |
| Diphthongs | centering | iə yə uə | | | | | | | |

- /ə/ is restricted to unstressed syllables.
- /oː/ is near-close [o̝ː].
- /ɛ/ is the only "short open E" sound in the dialect. The phonetically open [æ] does not have a phonemic status.
- /ɒ, ɒː/ are phonetically open but phonologically open-mid, the back counterparts of /œ, œː/.
- /aː/ is somewhat 'laxer' [ɐː] than in Standard Dutch. As in most other dialects, it is the phonological long counterpart of /ɑ/.

=== Pitch accent ===
As many other Limburgish dialects, the Venlo dialect features a contrastive pitch accent, with minimal pairs such speule /ˈspøːlə/ 'to rinse' vs. speule /ˈspǿːlə/ 'to play' and bein /ˈbɛjn/ 'legs' vs. bein /ˈbɛ́jn/ 'leg', with the first word in each pair featuring Accent 1 (left unmarked) and the second word Accent 2 (transcribed as a high tone).

== Bibliography ==
- Gussenhoven, Carlos; van der Vliet, Peter (1999), "The phonology of tone and intonation in the Dutch dialect of Venlo", Journal of Linguistics, 35: 99–135, doi:10.1017/S0022226798007324
- Peeters, F.J.P. (1951), Het klankkarakter van het Venloos, Nijmegen: Dekker & v.d. Vegt
