= Latin turned alpha =

Additional letter of the Latin alphabet

- Ɒ ɒ

Usage
- Writing system: Latin script
- Type: alphabetic
- Language of origin: International Phonetic Alphabet, Americanist phonetic notation, Teuthonista, Swedish Dialect Alphabet, Dania, Norvegia transcription
- Sound values: [ɒ]; [ɐ]; [ɑ]
- In Unicode: U+2C70, U+0252

History
- Development: A a, Ɑ ɑ: Ɒ ɒ
- Time period: 1890s to present

Other
- Writing direction: Left-to-Right

Latin turned alpha, also known as turned script A (uppercase: Ɒ, lowercase: ɒ), is an additional letter of the Latin script, based on letters A and Latin alpha (Ɑ). Its lowercase variant is used in International Phonetic Alphabet, Americanist phonetic notation, Uralic Phonetic Alphabet, Teuthonista, Swedish Dialect Alphabet, Dania, and Norvegia transcriptions. Its uppercase variant is used in the Americanist phonetic notation. The letter also appears in Belter Creole, a constructed language made by Nick Farmer for The Expanse television sci-fi series.

== Usage ==
In the 1890s, Philipp Lenz used the turned alpha in his phonetic transcription to represent a very short vowel A.

In Uralic Phonetic Alphabet, Swedish Dialect Alphabet, Dania, and Norvegia transcriptions, the lowercase letter is used to represent the near-open central vowel sound ([ɐ]). It also appears in Teuthonista transcription.

In the International Phonetic Alphabet, the lowercase letter is used to represent the open back rounded vowel sound, and is used for example, in the conventional phonemic transcription of the pronunciation of not in British Received Pronunciation. Its usage was originally proposed in the 1900s and 1910s and was formally introduced in the 1920s.

It appeared in the 1939 Handbook of the Linguistic Geography of New England, where it was used to represent the open back rounded vowel ([ɒ]). It is also sometimes appeared in other works, where it was used in to denote the open back unrounded vowel ([ɑ]).

In the Americanist phonetic notation the letter has its IPA value. The uppercase letter (Ɒ) is the same but voiceless.

The letter is also used in Belter Creole, a constructed language made by Nick Farmer for The Expanse television sci-fi series. It is sometimes used as an alternative variant for the digraph Ow, used to denote the open back rounded vowel ([ɒ]) sound. For example, the alternative spelling of the word owkwa, which means water, would be ɒkwa.

== Encodings ==
Character information
Preview	Ɒ		ɒ		ᶛ	
Unicode name	LATIN CAPITAL LETTER TURNED ALPHA		LATIN SMALL LETTER TURNED ALPHA		MODIFIER LETTER SMALL TURNED ALPHA	
Encodings	decimal	hex	dec	hex	dec	hex
Unicode	11376	U+2C70	594	U+0252	7579	U+1D9B
UTF-8	226 177 176	E2 B1 B0	201 146	C9 92	225 182 155	E1 B6 9B
Numeric character reference	&#11376;	&#x2C70;	&#594;	&#x252;	&#7579;	&#x1D9B;

== See also ==
- Transformation of text

== Bibliography ==
- Philipp Lenz, Der Handschuhsheimer dialekt: Nachtrag zum wörterverzeichnis von 1887, Darmstadt, G. Otto, 1892.
- Manne Eriksson, Svensk ljudskrift 1878–1960: En översikt över det svenska landsmålsalfabetets utveckling och användning huvudsakligen i tidskriften Svenska Landsmål, Stockholm, P. A. Norstedt & Söner, 1961.
- The principles of the International Phonetic Association, Paris, London, International Phonetic Association, 1912.
- Martin Heepe, Lautzeichen und ihre Anwendung in verschiedenen Sprachgebieten, Berlin, Reichsdruckerei, 1928.
- Hans Kurath (director), Marcus L. Hansen, Julia Bloch, Bernard Bloch, Handbook of the Linguistic Geography of New England, 1939.
- William A. Smalley, Manual of Articulatory Phonetics. Revised Edition, Lanham, MD, University Press of America, Inc., 1989.
- Lorna A. Priest, Proposal to encode two phonetic characters and two Shona characters, 2007.
- Luanne von Schneidemesser, Lewis Lawyer, Ken Whistler, Deborah Anderson, Proposal for Two Phonetic Characters (no L2/12-266)
