= Open central vowel =

Open central vowel may refer to:

- Open central unrounded vowel, a vowel sound written as ⟨ä⟩ or ⟨ɑ̈⟩ in the International Phonetic Alphabet
- Open central rounded vowel, a vowel sound written as ⟨ɒ̈⟩ or ⟨ɶ̈⟩ in the International Phonetic Alphabet
