= Belter Creole =

Constructed language created by Nick Farmer for The Expanse

- lang belta
- Created by: Nick Farmer
- Setting and usage: The Expanse
- Purpose: Constructed languages: Artistic languages; Fictional languages; Belter Creole
- Writing system: Latin script
- Sources: English and other world languages

Official status
- Regulated by: Nick Farmer

Language codes
- ISO 639-3: qbc (local use)
- Glottolog: None
- IETF: art-x-belter (local use)

Belter Creole, also simply known as Belter (Belter Creole: lang belta), is a constructed language developed by linguist Nick Farmer for The Expanse television series. In the story's universe, it is spoken by Belters, the inhabitants of the asteroid belt and the moons of outer planets of the Solar System.

Farmer was commissioned to create the language during the productions of the first season of the show, between 2014 and 2015. He modeled it as a creole based on English, with influence from other languages from around the world, including Romance languages such as Spanish, French, Portuguese and Italian, Germanic languages such as German, Dutch and Swedish, Slavic languages such as Polish, Russian and Ukrainian, as well as Japanese, Chinese, Persian, Arabic, Hebrew, Zulu and others. As a result of his work, Farmer created over 1000 words for his language, adding more to the list if requested by the show's producers and fans.

== Development ==
The concept of the language appeared for the first time in the book Leviathan Wakes (2011), the first book in The Expanse series by Daniel Abraham and Ty Franck under the pen name James S.A. Corey. Belter Creole continued to appear in the subsequent books in the series. The language presented in the books lacked developed vocabulary as well as grammar, phonological, and orthographic systems. It was a mix of words taken from various languages and was mostly presented as a dialect mixed with the English dialogue, "to give the reader a sense of being excluded from this culture".

The vocabulary used in the books was chosen by the authors on the basis of aesthetics and was not originally intended to form a real language. When the language was later developed more fully for The Expanse television series, the authors of the novel series discouraged fans from learning their version of the language in favor of the television one.

Nick Farmer, a linguist and a polyglot, was commissioned to develop the constructed language for the television series, during the production of its first season between 2014 and 2015. Farmer was recommended for the job by Ty Franck, as both had worked together before.

Inside the universe of The Expanse, which is set around 200 years in the future, the language is used by Belters, the inhabitants of the asteroid belt and the moons of outer planets of the Solar System. The language had developed during the colonization of the Asteroid Belt, firstly starting as the pidgin spoken by people who came to the colonies from Earth speaking in various languages from all around the world. With next generations, the language had developed into the creole. The language had various dialects and accents, that would vary from one location to another. According to Farmer, the vocabulary and grammar rules, present in the show, and revealed by the author himself, were a dialect used on Ceres.

Farmer modeled the language as a creole based on English, with influence of other languages from all around the world, including Romance languages such as Spanish, French, Portuguese, and Italian, Germanic languages such as German, Dutch, and Swedish, Slavic languages such as Polish, Russian, and Ukrainian, as well as Japanese, Chinese, Persian, Hindi, Arabic, Hebrew, Zulu, and others. Farmer created over 1000 words for his language, adding more to the list if requested by show's producers and fans.

The pronunciation of the language was developed by Farmer and Eric Armstrong, a dialect coach. During development, they came to the conclusion that the language's pronunciation and tone had become too similar to that of Jamaican English. As a result, Armstrong suggested that Farmer make various modifications to the phonological, morphological, and lexicological characteristics, such that the language's overall sound gave an impression that it derived via an amalgamation of several existent languages and cultures of a near-future, homogeneous working-class population. They accomplished this goal by fusing together various elements of multiple real-world cants, dialects, and accents to form distinct types of Belter drawls or sounds and then encouraged the actors to choose one which fit their character. Additionally, the producers were advised to deliberately create a cast of actors and actresses who spoke in varying accent types so as to illustrate real-world concepts observed in societies and cultures where creole and pidgin languages are spoken. For example, in Season 3, actors Dominique Tipper and Cara Gee introduced the concepts of code switching and English spoken as a second language as paradigms of Belter Creole and culture.

The show's producers did not want to use subtitles when Belter Creole was used, but wanted the audience to be capable of dialogue comprehension via recognizable phonological similarities to English words and phrases, and contextual inference. Due to that, for most of its appearances, the language was presented only as various words mixed in the English dialogue. During the show production, Farmer made three versions of the lines for the script, one entirely in the Belter, one with medium Belter influence, and one with light usage of the Belter. Then, actors would learn and shoot all three variants of the scenes, and later the producers would choose which version they wanted to use.

The language appeared for the first time in "Dulcinea", the pilot episode of The Expanse, that premiered in 2015, and regularly appeared in the show throughout its six seasons. Since the production of the pilot, looping voice actors were taught belter language by Armstrong.

As the language gained popularity, Farmer started regularly revealing new words and grammar functions on his Twitter account. He also gave language lessons to the fans during meet-ups.

== Phonology ==
=== Orthography and pronunciation ===
According to Farmer, in the universe of The Expanse there is no standardized orthography of the language; variants are used in different parts of the asteroid belt and the outer planets. Additionally, although all of Farmer's posts, and all the appearances of the language in written form in the TV series, are written in the Latin script, according to Farmer Belter Creole can also be written with other writing systems.

The standard alphabet used by Farmer to write down Belter Creole in the TV series script and his Twitter posts includes 24 letters of the Latin script, omitting J and Q from the standard 26-letter alphabet of the English language.

Additionally, Farmer's script includes five digraphs, ⟨ch⟩, ⟨ng⟩, ⟨ny⟩, ⟨ow⟩, and ⟨sh⟩, as well as one trigraph, ⟨dzh⟩. Letters ⟨c⟩ and ⟨h⟩ are present only in the digraphs ⟨ch⟩ and ⟨sh⟩, and in trigraph ⟨dzh⟩, while ⟨j⟩ and ⟨q⟩ are present only in the loanwords. As an exception, the letter ⟨c⟩ is sometimes used in place of ⟨k⟩, for example in words such as copeng ("friend") and condenashang ("condemnation"), which are usually spelled, respectively, as kopeng and kondenashang.

Farmer also uses the turned alpha (capital: ⟨Ɒ⟩, lowercase: ⟨ɒ⟩) as an alternative spelling of the digraph ⟨ow⟩, which is used to represent the open back rounded vowel sound. For example, the alternative spelling of the word owkwa ("water") would be ɒkwa.

Pronunciation
Letter	Pronunciation	Belter example (translation)	English example	Notes	Source
a	/æ/	kuxaku (space, vacuum)	cat (US)		
ɒ	/ɒ/	ɒkwa (water)	not (RP) thought (US)	Rarer variant spelling, alternative to ⟨ow⟩	
b	/b/	beratna (brother)	aback		
c	/k/	copeng (friend)	kiss	Rarely used spelling variant, alternative to ⟨k⟩	
ch	/t͡ʃ/	chek (to check)	chew		
d	/d/	dansa (to dance)	dash		
dzh	/d͡ʒ/	nadzhush (tired)	jump		
e	/e/	teki (technology)	may		
f	/f/	fut (food)	fill		
g	/g/	gova (head)	globe		
h	/x/	hamma (inescapable torpedo range)	loch (Scottish)	Similar to ⟨h⟩ in English here; rarely used variant spelling, alternative to ⟨x⟩	
i	/i/	lit (to read)	machine		
k	/k/	kopeng (friend)	kiss		
l	/l/	lang (language)	let		
m	/m/	mang (person)	him		
n	/n/	nada (zero)	month		
ng	/ŋ/	nating (nothing)	sing		
ny	/ɲ/	xunyam (to study, learn)		Similar to ⟨ny⟩ in English canyon	
o	/o/	ora (hour)	yawn		
ow	/ɒ/	owkwa (water)	not (RP) thought (US)		
p	/p/	pelésh (place)	pack		
r	/ɾ/	retnet (network)	better (US)		
s	/s/	salta (leap, jump)	sand		
sh	/ʃ/	seteshang (station)	sheep		
t	/t/	tenye (to own)	trouble		
u	/u/	unte (and)	boot		
v	/v/	livit (life)	very		
w	/w/	wit (with)	weep		
x	/x/	xiya (here)	loch (Scottish)	Similar to ⟨h⟩ in English here	
y	/j/	ya (yes)	yes		
z	/z/	zakong (law)	zoo		

The acute accent placed above the letters ⟨a⟩, ⟨e⟩, ⟨o⟩ and ⟨u⟩ is used to indicate different than usual stress in the word pronunciation. Example of such are ⟨á⟩ in ámolof (/'æ.mo.lof/) which means love, ⟨é⟩ in idzhifobék (/i.d͡ʒi.fo'bek/) which means weak, ⟨ó⟩ in belówt (/be'lɒt/) which means blood, and ⟨ú⟩ in gútegow (/'gu.te.gɒ/) which means ready.

Letters with diacritics
Uppercase letters	Á	É	Ó	Ú
Lowercase letters	á	é	ó	ú

=== Epenthesis and elision ===
When forming compounds, epenthetic vowels are sometimes added to the words. Such vowels are ⟨a⟩ and, less commonly, ⟨e⟩. Examples of such changes are:

- bek + da + bush → bekedabúsh
- na + kang + pensa → nakangepensa
- tung + ting → túngeting
- im + lowda → imalowda

Consonants at the morpheme boundary can be also elided instead. Examples of such changes are:

- kowl + mang → kowmang
- zakong + mang → zákomang

=== Stress ===
In most cases the primary stress falls on the penultimate syllable of a word. For example, in:

- showxa (/'ʃɒ.xæ/)
- seteshang (/se'te.ʃæŋ/)
- gufovedi (/gu.fo've.di/)

If the stress for a particular word is on a different syllable, this is indicated with an addition of the acute accent above the letters ⟨a⟩, ⟨e⟩, ⟨o⟩ and ⟨u⟩. Examples of such words are:

- ámolof (/'æ.mo.lof/)
- idzhifobék (/i.d͡ʒi.fo'bek/)
- belówt (/be'lɒt/)

When forming compound words, the stress often remains on the head of the compound, which sometimes requires the addition of an accent mark:

- zakong (/'zæ.koŋ/) → zákomang (/'zæ.ko.mæŋ/)
- gut (/gut/) → gútegow (/'gu.te.gɒ/)
- tung (/tuŋ/) → túngeting (/'tuŋ.e.tiŋ/)

== Grammar ==
=== Nouns and adjectives ===
Nouns are not inflected for grammatical number. For example, mang can mean both a person and people. The quantity is instead determined by the presence of quantifiers or numerals, or inferred from context. For example wang mang means one person and tu mang means two people. The exceptions are the pronouns, which have both singular and plural forms.

Adjectives are placed after the nouns they modify, for example in setara mali, which means little star.

Nouns can also serve as adjectives, and so follow the nouns they modify. For example, diye beref, which means birthday, is formed from the words diye, meaning day, and beref, meaning birth.

=== Verbs ===
Many verbs can be formed from nouns by adding du, meaning do and make, before of the noun. For example, adding du before the noun ámolof, which translates to the noun love, will form du ámolof, which translates to the verb love. Additionally, in a few cases, adding the prefix du- to a verb can change its meaning. For example, adding it to the verb sensa, which means feel, produces du-sensa, which means apologize.

=== Articles ===
Belter Creole has two articles: indefinite wa, corresponding to English a and an, and definite da, corresponding to English the.

The indefinite article wa is used to mark an indefinite noun phrase. A noun phrase with an indefinite article does not refer to a specific entity. For example, the sentence Tenye wa diye beref gut. means Have a happy birthday.

The definite article da is used to mark a definite noun phrase. A noun phrase with a definite article refers to a particular member of a group. For example, the sentence Kepelésh da seteshang? means Where is the station?. When a noun is marked with da, any attributive nouns or adjectives applied to that noun must also be so marked. For example, da setara da mali means the little star. The definite article is also sometimes used before a person's name, for example da Naomi for the name Naomi.

=== Pronouns ===
The language has two sets of three pronouns, each having singular and plural forms. All pronouns in Belter are gender-neutral. Plural pronouns are formed by adding the suffix -lowda to singular pronouns.

Pronouns
	Singular	Plural
1st	mi (I)	milowda (we)
2nd	to (you)	tolowda (you)
3rd	im (he/she/they/it)	imalowda, imim (they)

=== Tenses and aspects ===
The language has three basic tenses which are the past, the present, and the future. Sentences without tense indicators are in the present tense. For example: mi showxa, which means I speak. The past tense is indicated by adding ta after the pronoun. For example: mi ta showxa, which means I spoke. The future tense is indicated by adding gonya after the pronoun. For example: mi gonya showxa, which means I will speak.

It also has three grammatical aspects, which are the continuous, the habitual, and the perfective. The continuous aspect specifies incomplete action or state in progress at a specific time. It is indicated by adding ando after the pronoun. For example: mi ando showxa, which means I am speaking. The habitual aspect specifies an action as occurring habitually. It is indicated by adding tili after the pronoun. For example: mi tili showxa, which means I regularly speak. The perfective aspect specifies an action viewed as a simple whole. It is indicated by adding finyish after the pronoun. For example, mi finyish showxa, which means I have spoken, and mi ta finyish showxa which means I had spoken.

When indicators of both tense and aspect are present in the sentence, the tense indicator is put before the aspect's one. For example: mi ta ando showxa, which means, I was speaking.

=== Sentence structure ===
The sentence structure of Belter Creole is subject–verb–object, which means that the subject comes first, the verb second, and the object third. It also has the zero copula, the phenomenon in which the subject is joined to the predicate without overt marking of this relationship. For example, in the sentence: mi nadzhush, which means I am tired, but in the literal translation would mean I tired.

=== Forming questions ===
The questions are formed by adding the word ke at the end of the sentence. For example, the sentence "To showxa lang Belta", which means You speak Belter Creole, after transforming it into the "To showxa lang Belta, ke?", will mean "Do you speak Belter Creole?".

When asking a question on which both speakers agree, keyá, meaning is it not, is used instead. For example, the sentence "To showxa lang Belta, keyá?" means "You speak Belter Creole, do you not?".

The questions containing interrogatives do not require the addition of the word ke. These words are:

- kemang – who
- kepelésh – where
- ketim – when
- keting – what
- kewe – how
- kéweting – what kind/type
- kéradzhang – why, for what reason
- kédawang – which
- kelowda – how many/much

An example of such sentence is "Kepelésh shapu to?" which means "Where is your hat?".

== Vocabulary ==
=== Example words ===
Belter	English	Etymology
owkwa	water	Italian acqua, water; Spanish agua, water
ereluf	air	English air + German Luft, air
losh	light	Portuguese luz, light; Italian luce, light
nalosh	dark	English no + Portuguese luz, light; Italian luce, light
beratna	brother	
sésata	sister	
mang	person	English man, human
kopeng	friends	French copain, friend; Mandarin Chinese 朋友 (péngyou), friend
xante	hand	English hand
lek	leg, foot	English leg
gova	head	Polish głowa, German Kopf, head
sasa	know	Spanish saber, know
pensa	think, believe	Spanish pensar, think
ámolof	love	Spanish amo, love + English love
imbobo	hole, apartment, room	Zulu imbobo, hole
ya	yes	English yes, yeah; German ja; Dutch ja, yes
na	no	English no
unte	and	German und, and
rosse buurt	red light district	Dutch rosse buurt, red light district
oye	hello	Spanish oye, hey
oyedeng	goodbye	
taki taki	thank you	Swedish tack, thank you; Norwegian Takk; Danish tak, thanks; Mandarin Chinese 谢谢 (xièxiè), thank you

=== Numbers ===
Belter numbers
Number	Belter word	Number	Belter word	Number	Belter word
0	nada				
1	wang	10	teng	100	xanya
2	tu	20	tuteng	200	túxanya
3	serí	30	seriteng	300	seríxanya
4	fu	40	futeng	400	fúxanya
5	faf	50	fáveteng	500	fávexanya
6	sikesh	60	síkeseteng	600	síkesexanya
7	seng	70	séngeteng	700	séngexanya
8	et	80	éteteng	800	étexanya
9	nang	90	nángeteng	900	nángexanya
				1000	towseng

Numbers with values in both tens and ones are formed by combining ones number with tens number, and joining them with affix -un-. For example:

- 18 = et-un-teng ("eight and ten")
- 81 = wang-un-éteteng ("one and eight tens")

When forming a number with hundreds place, the hundreds number is placed at the beginning of the number, then followed by the one and ten numbers format. For example:

- 281 = túxanya wang-un-éteteng ("two hundred one and eight tens")

When used attributively, numbers come before the noun they count, for example in the sentence serí buk, which means three books.

== In popular culture ==
A few songs were written in Belter Creole, which include covers of the "Tighten Up", "Highway Star", and "All by Myself", the latter renamed to "I'm All Alone". The covers were commissioned for The Expanse television series and had their lyrics adjusted to fit the Expanse universe setting and rewritten in the mix of Belter Creole and English. The songs were used in the first and third seasons of the show, premiering in 2015 and 2018, respectively. The full versions of the songs were later placed on The Collector's Edition version of the TV series soundtrack, which was released on 13 December 2019.

The cover of "Tighten Up", originally by The Black Keys, was performed by Justin Young. It was used in the first episode of the first season, titled "Dulcinea", that had premiered in 2015.

The cover of the "Highway Star", originally by Deep Purple, was performed by Cory Todd. Additionally, as the song was adjusted to the setting of the universe, the references to the car from the original song were replaced with the spaceship. The cover of "All by Myself", originally by Eric Carmen, was renamed to "I'm All Alone", and performed by Ghian Wright. Both songs were used in the episode of the third season, titled "Delta-V", that had premiered in 2018.

In January 2022, Twitter accounts of space agencies NASA and ESA posted in Belter Creole.

== Sample text ==
Article 1 of the Universal Declaration of Human Rights in Belter Creole:

Kowl mang fong beref im im ferí unte eka [...]. Imalowda pensa unte sensa we gut unte we mal. Unte im mogut fo manting du wit sif asilik beratna unte sésata.

Article 1 of the Universal Declaration of Human Rights in English:

All human beings are born free and equal [...]. They are endowed with reason and conscience and should act towards one another in a spirit of brotherhood.
