= Ɐ =

Letter of the Latin Alphabet and an IPA sample

Turned A (capital: Ɐ, lowercase: ɐ, math symbol ∀) is a Latin script letter and symbol based upon the letter A.

== Modern usage ==
- Lowercase ⟨ɐ⟩ (in Roman or "two-storey" form) is used in the International Phonetic Alphabet to identify the near-open central vowel. This is not to be confused with the turned alpha or turned script a ⟨ɒ⟩, which is used in the IPA for the open back rounded vowel.
- The logical symbol ⟨∀⟩ has the same shape as a sans-serif capital turned A. It is used to represent universal quantification in predicate logic, where it is typically read as "for all". It was first used in this way by Gerhard Gentzen in 1935, by analogy with Giuseppe Peano's turned E notation for existential quantification and the later use of Peano's notation by Bertrand Russell.

== Historical usage ==
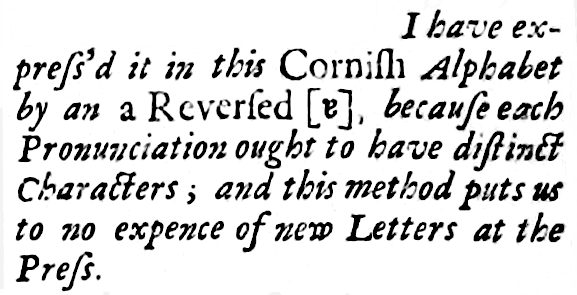
Turned a presented in Edward Lhuyd's Archaeologia Britannica, 1707.oAo

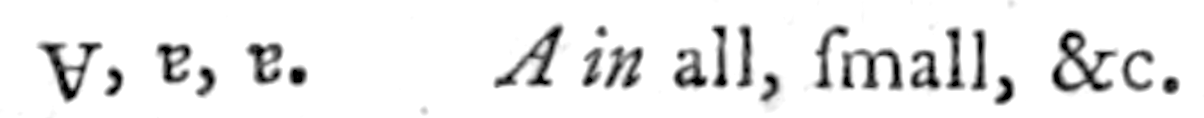
Turned a in William Pryce's Archaeologia Cornu-Britannica, 1790.

Because of the relative ease of creating this letterform using traditional printing methods, it had frequent and varied historical uses. According to the principle of acrophony, the letter A originated from the Proto-Sinaitic alphabet as a symbol representing the head of an ox or cow (aleph), its orientation and original meaning having been lost over time. The turned A symbol restores the letter to a more easily recognizable logographic representation of an ox's head.

A denarius coin from the Roman Republic has been found, struck with a (capital) turned A, in the collection of a Madrid-based numismatist; it is unclear whether this was intentional, or a printer's error for a V.

It was used in the 18th century by Edward Lhuyd and William Pryce as a phonetic character for the Cornish language. In their books, both Ɐ and ɐ have been used. It was used in the 19th century by Charles Sanders Peirce as a logical symbol for un-American.

U+1D44 ᵄ MODIFIER LETTER SMALL TURNED A is used in the Uralic Phonetic Alphabet, a system developed in the early 20th century for transcribing Uralic languages. However, as this system was not standardized across (nor within) languages, it has been supplanted in this use by the International Phonetic Alphabet.

== Encodings ==
Character information
Preview	Ɐ		ɐ		∀	
Unicode name	LATIN CAPITAL LETTER TURNED A		LATIN SMALL LETTER TURNED A		FOR ALL	
Encodings	decimal	hex	dec	hex	dec	hex
Unicode	11375	U+2C6F	592	U+0250	8704	U+2200
UTF-8	226 177 175	E2 B1 AF	201 144	C9 90	226 136 128	E2 88 80
Numeric character reference	&#11375;	&#x2C6F;	&#592;	&#x250;	&#8704;	&#x2200;
Named character reference					&ForAll;, &forall;	
Symbol font					34	22
TeX					\forall	

== See also ==
- List of logic symbols
- List of mathematical symbols
- Transformation of text
- Rotated letter
- Turn A Gundam
