= Open-mid back unrounded vowel =

Vowel sound represented by ⟨ʌ⟩ in IPA

ʌ
- IPA number: 314

Audio sample
- source · help

Encoding
- Entity (decimal): &#652;
- Unicode (hex): U+028C
- X-SAMPA: V
- Braille: ⠬ (braille pattern dots-346)
Image

IPA: Vowels

| | Front | Central | Back |
|---|---|---|---|
| Close | i y | ɨ ʉ | ɯ u |
| Near-close | ɪ ʏ | | ʊ |
| Close-mid | e ø | ɘ ɵ | ɤ o |
| Mid | e̞ ø̞ | ə | ɤ̞ o̞ |
| Open-mid | ɛ œ | ɜ ɞ | ʌ ɔ |
| Near-open | æ | ɐ |
| Open | a ɶ | ä | ɑ ɒ |

- IPA help
- audio
- full chart
- template

Legend: unrounded • rounded

The open-mid back unrounded vowel or low-mid back unrounded vowel is a type of vowel sound, used in some spoken languages. The symbol in the International Phonetic Alphabet that represents this sound is ⟨ʌ⟩, graphically a rotated lowercase "v" (called a turned V but created as a small-capital ⟨ᴀ⟩ without the crossbar, even though some vendors display it as a real turned v). Both the symbol and the sound are commonly referred to as a "wedge", "caret" or "hat". In transcriptions for English, this symbol is commonly used for the near-open central unrounded vowel and in transcriptions for Danish, it is used for the open back rounded vowel.

== Features ==
- Its vowel height is open-mid, also known as low-mid, which means the tongue is positioned halfway between an open vowel (a low vowel) and a mid vowel.
- Its vowel backness is back, which means the tongue is positioned back in the mouth without creating a constriction that would be classified as a consonant. Unrounded back vowels tend to be centralized, which means that often they are in fact near-back.
- Its place of articulation is pharyngeal, which means it is articulated with the tongue root against the back of the throat (the pharynx).
- It is unrounded, which means that the lips are not rounded.

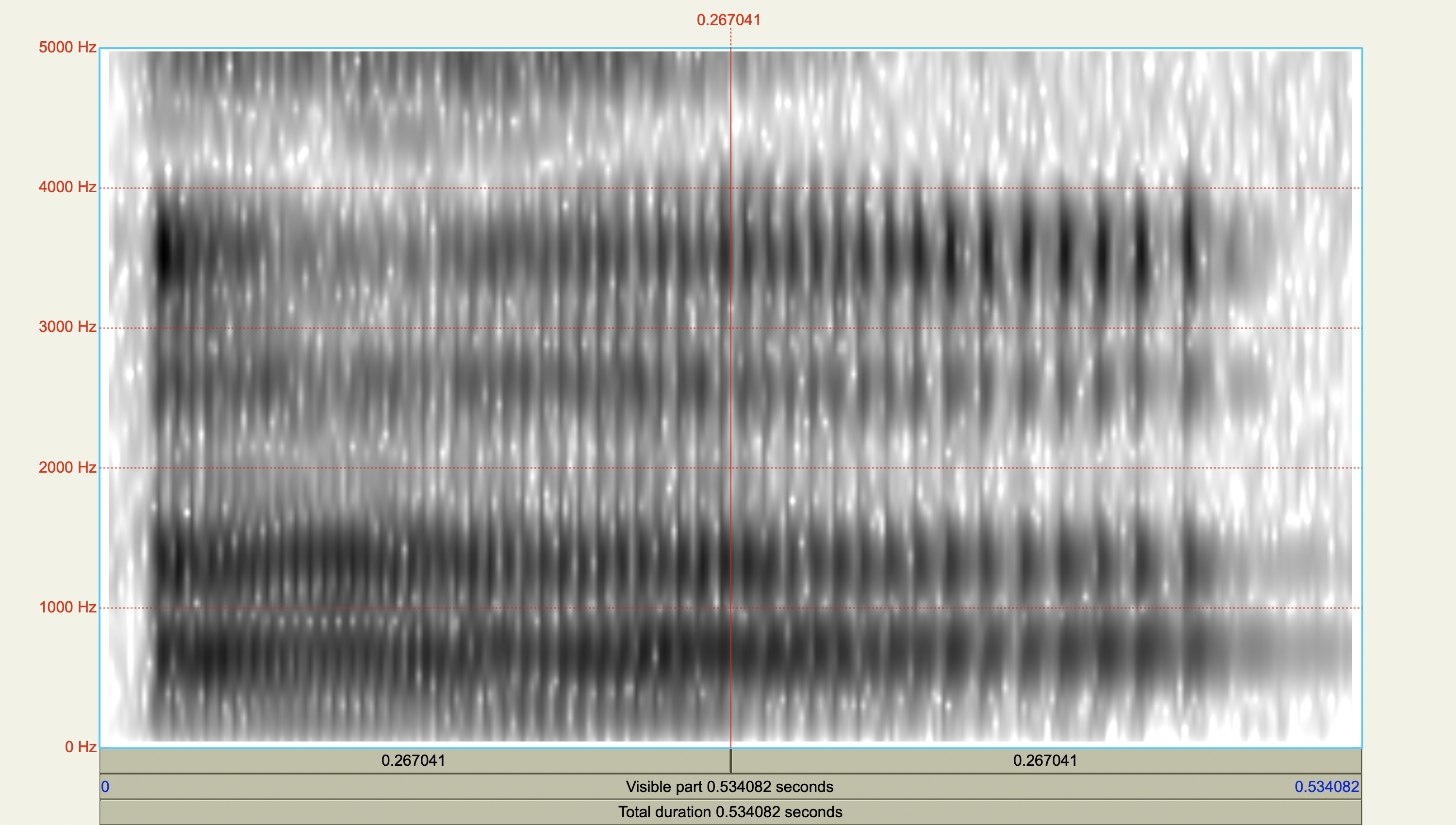
Spectrogram of [ʌ]

== Occurrence ==
| Language | | Word | IPA | Meaning | Notes |
|---|---|---|---|---|---|
| Ajië | | kë | [kʌˀ] | 'pot' | Distinct from /ə/ |
| Catalan | Solsonès | tarda | [ˈt̪ɑrð̞ʌːˠ] | 'afternoon' | Velarized and long realization of final unstressed /ə/, also represented as [ʌ̃ː] |
| Danish | | slot | [ˈslʌt] | 'castle' | Usually transcribed as /ɒ/ but more mid-centralized [ɒ̽]. |
| Emilian | most Emilian dialects | Bulåggna | [buˈlʌɲːɐ] | 'Bologna' | It corresponds to a sound between /ɔ/ to /ä/; written ò in some spellings |
| English | Cape Town | lot | [lʌt] | 'lot' | It corresponds to a weakly rounded [ɒ̈] in all other South African dialects. See South African English phonology |
| English | Natal | lot | [lʌt] | 'lot' | It corresponds to a weakly rounded [ɒ̈] in all other South African dialects. See South African English phonology |
| English | Cardiff | thought | [θʌːt] | 'thought' | For some speakers it may be rounded and closer. See English phonology |
| English | General South African | no | [nʌː] | 'no' | May be a diphthong [ʌʊ̯] instead. See South African English phonology |
| English | General American | gut | [ɡʌt] | 'gut' | In some dialects, fronted to [ɜ], or fronted and lowered to [ɐ]. In Standard Southern British English, [ʌ] is increasingly heard in place of [ɐ] to avoid the trap–strut merger. See English phonology and Northern Cities Vowel Shift |
| English | Inland Northern American | gut | [ɡʌt] | 'gut' | In some dialects, fronted to [ɜ], or fronted and lowered to [ɐ]. In Standard Southern British English, [ʌ] is increasingly heard in place of [ɐ] to avoid the trap–strut merger. See English phonology and Northern Cities Vowel Shift |
| English | Multicultural London | gut | [ɡʌt] | 'gut' | In some dialects, fronted to [ɜ], or fronted and lowered to [ɐ]. In Standard Southern British English, [ʌ] is increasingly heard in place of [ɐ] to avoid the trap–strut merger. See English phonology and Northern Cities Vowel Shift |
| English | Newfoundland | gut | [ɡʌt] | 'gut' | In some dialects, fronted to [ɜ], or fronted and lowered to [ɐ]. In Standard Southern British English, [ʌ] is increasingly heard in place of [ɐ] to avoid the trap–strut merger. See English phonology and Northern Cities Vowel Shift |
| English | Northern East Anglian | gut | [ɡʌt] | 'gut' | In some dialects, fronted to [ɜ], or fronted and lowered to [ɐ]. In Standard Southern British English, [ʌ] is increasingly heard in place of [ɐ] to avoid the trap–strut merger. See English phonology and Northern Cities Vowel Shift |
| English | Philadelphia | gut | [ɡʌt] | 'gut' | In some dialects, fronted to [ɜ], or fronted and lowered to [ɐ]. In Standard Southern British English, [ʌ] is increasingly heard in place of [ɐ] to avoid the trap–strut merger. See English phonology and Northern Cities Vowel Shift |
| English | Scottish | gut | [ɡʌt] | 'gut' | In some dialects, fronted to [ɜ], or fronted and lowered to [ɐ]. In Standard Southern British English, [ʌ] is increasingly heard in place of [ɐ] to avoid the trap–strut merger. See English phonology and Northern Cities Vowel Shift |
| English | Some Estuary English speakers | gut | [ɡʌt] | 'gut' | In some dialects, fronted to [ɜ], or fronted and lowered to [ɐ]. In Standard Southern British English, [ʌ] is increasingly heard in place of [ɐ] to avoid the trap–strut merger. See English phonology and Northern Cities Vowel Shift |
| English | Some Standard Southern British speakers | gut | [ɡʌt] | 'gut' | In some dialects, fronted to [ɜ], or fronted and lowered to [ɐ]. In Standard Southern British English, [ʌ] is increasingly heard in place of [ɐ] to avoid the trap–strut merger. See English phonology and Northern Cities Vowel Shift |
| French | Picardy | alors | [aˈlʌʀ̥] | 'so' | Corresponding to /ɔ/ in standard French. |
| German | Chemnitz dialect | machen | [ˈmʌχɴ̩] | 'to do' | Allophone of /ʌ, ʌː/ (which phonetically are central [ɜ, ɜː]) before and after /ŋ, kʰ, k, χ, ʁ/. Exact backness varies; it is most posterior before /χ, ʁ/. |
| Haida | | ḵwaáay | [qʷʰʌʔáːj] | 'the rock' | Allophone of /a/ (sometimes also /aː/) after uvular and epiglottal consonants. |
| Irish | Ulster dialect | ola | [ʌl̪ˠə] | 'oil' | See Irish phonology |
| Kaingang | | [ˈɾʌ] | | 'mark' | Varies between back [ʌ] and central [ɜ]. |
| Kashmiri | | از | [ʌz] | 'today' | Allophone of [ɐ]. Used only in monosyllables. Typical of the Srinagar variety. |
| Kensiu | | [hʌʎ] | | 'stream' | |
| Korean | | 너 / neo | [nʌ̹] | 'you' | See Korean phonology |
| Lillooet | | | | | Retracted counterpart of /ə/. |
| Mah Meri | | | | | Allophone of /ə/; can be mid central [ə] or close-mid back [ɤ] instead. |
| Nepali | | असल/asal | [ʌsʌl] | 'good' | See Nepali phonology |
| Norwegian | Solør | fäss | [fʌs] | 'waterfall' | In traditional dialect transcriptions, this vowel is written consequently as ⟨ä⟩, and has existed as a separate vowel in addition to ⟨æ⟩, [æ]. This is because ⟨ä⟩ has evolved from an unrounding of short ⟨o⟩. ⟨ä⟩ has morphed to [æ] with younger speakers. |
| Ossetian | Digor | майрӕнбон / majrænbon | [majrʌnbon] | 'Friday' | Common sound in the Digor dialect. In the Iron dialect, this sound is replaced by a near-open central vowel. |
| Portuguese | Greater Lisbon area | leite | [ˈɫ̪ʌjt̪ɨ̞] | 'milk' | Allophone of /ɐ/ before /i/ (forming a phonetic diphthong [ʌj]). Corresponds to [e] in other accents. See Portuguese phonology |
| Russian | Standard Saint Petersburg | голова/golová | [ɡəɫ̪ʌˈvä] | 'head' | Corresponds to [ɐ] in standard Moscow pronunciation; occurs mostly immediately before stressed syllables. See Russian phonology |
| Scottish Gaelic | Barra | duine | [ˈt̪ɯɲʌ] | 'person' | Dialectal allophone of [ə] in word-final position. |
| Tamil | | | | | Nasalized. Phonetic realization of the sequence /am/, may be [õ] or [ã] instead. See Tamil phonology |
| Xavante | | | [jʌm] | 'seed' | The nasal version [ʌ̃] also occurs. |

Before World War II, the /ʌ/ of Received Pronunciation was phonetically close to a back vowel [ʌ], which has since shifted forward towards [ɐ] (a near-open central unrounded vowel). Daniel Jones reported his speech (southern British) as having an advanced back vowel [ʌ̟] between his central /ə/ and back /ɔ/; however, he also reported that other southern speakers had a lower and even more advanced vowel that approached cardinal [a]. In American English varieties, such as in the West, the Midwest, and the urban South, the typical phonetic realization of the phoneme /ʌ/ is an open-mid central [ɜ]. Truly backed variants of /ʌ/ that are phonetically [ʌ] can occur in Inland Northern American English, Newfoundland English, Philadelphia English, some of African-American English, and (old-fashioned) white Southern American English in coastal plain and Piedmont areas. However, the letter ⟨ʌ⟩ is still commonly used to indicate this phoneme, even in the more common varieties with central variants [ɐ] or [ɜ]. That may be because of both tradition and some other dialects retaining the older pronunciation.

== Notes ==
| Place → | Labial | | | | | Coronal | | | | | | | | | | Dorsal | | | | | Laryngeal | | | |
| Manner ↓ | Bilabial | | Labiodental | | Linguolabial | | Dental | | Alveolar | | Postalveolar | | Retroflex | | (Alveolo-)palatal | | Velar | | Uvular | | Pharyngeal/epiglottal | | Glottal | |
|---|---|---|---|---|---|---|---|---|---|---|---|---|---|---|---|---|---|---|---|---|---|---|---|---|
| Nasal | m̥ | m | ɱ̊ | ɱ | | n̼ | n̪̊ | n̪ | n̥ | n | n̠̊ | n̠ | ɳ̊ | ɳ | ɲ̊ | ɲ | ŋ̊ | ŋ | ɴ̥ | ɴ | | | | |
| Plosive | p | b | p̪ | b̪ | t̼ | d̼ | t̪ | d̪ | t | d | | | ʈ | ɖ | c | ɟ | k | ɡ | q | ɢ | ʡ | | ʔ | |
| Sibilant affricate | | | | | | | t̪s̪ | d̪z̪ | ts | dz | t̠ʃ | d̠ʒ | tʂ | dʐ | tɕ | dʑ | | | | | | | | |
| Non-sibilant affricate | pɸ | bβ | p̪f | b̪v | | | t̪θ | d̪ð | tɹ̝̊ | dɹ̝ | t̠ɹ̠̊˔ | d̠ɹ̠˔ | | | cç | ɟʝ | kx | ɡɣ | qχ | ɢʁ | ʡʜ | ʡʢ | ʔh | |
| Sibilant fricative | | | | | | | s̪ | z̪ | s | z | ʃ | ʒ | ʂ | ʐ | ɕ | ʑ | | | | | | | | |
| Non-sibilant fricative | ɸ | β | f | v | θ̼ | ð̼ | θ | ð | θ̠ | ð̠ | ɹ̠̊˔ | ɹ̠˔ | ɻ̊˔ | ɻ˔ | ç | ʝ | x | ɣ | χ | ʁ | ħ | ʕ | h | ɦ |
| Approximant | | β̞ | | ʋ | | | | ð̞ | | ɹ | | ɹ̠ | | ɻ | | j | | ɰ | | | | | | ˷ |
| Tap/flap | | ⱱ̟ | | ⱱ | | | | | ɾ̥ | ɾ | | | ɽ̊ | ɽ | | | | | | ɢ̆ | | ʡ̆ | | |
| Trill | ʙ̥ | ʙ | | | | | | | r̥ | r | | r̠ | ɽ̊r̥ | ɽr | | | | | ʀ̥ | ʀ | ʜ | ʢ | | |
| Lateral affricate | | | | | | | | | tɬ | dɮ | | | tꞎ | d𝼅 | c𝼆 | ɟʎ̝ | k𝼄 | ɡʟ̝ | | | | | | |
| Lateral fricative | | | | | | | ɬ̪ | | ɬ | ɮ | | | ꞎ | 𝼅 | 𝼆 | ʎ̝ | 𝼄 | ʟ̝ | | | | | | |
| Lateral approximant | | | | | | | | l̪ | l̥ | l | | l̠ | ɭ̊ | ɭ | ʎ̥ | ʎ | ʟ̥ | ʟ | | ʟ̠ | | | | |
| Lateral tap/flap | | | | | | | | | ɺ̥ | ɺ | | | 𝼈̊ | 𝼈 | | ʎ̆ | | ʟ̆ | | | | | | |

| | | BL | LD | D | A | PA | RF | P | V | U |
|---|---|---|---|---|---|---|---|---|---|---|
| Implosive | Voiced | ɓ | | | ɗ | | ᶑ | ʄ | ɠ | ʛ |
| Implosive | Voiceless | ɓ̥ | | | ɗ̥ | | ᶑ̊ | ʄ̊ | ɠ̊ | ʛ̥ |
| Ejective | Stop | pʼ | | | tʼ | | ʈʼ | cʼ | kʼ | qʼ |
| Ejective | Affricate | | p̪fʼ | tθʼ | tsʼ | tʃʼ | tʂʼ | tɕʼ | kxʼ | qχʼ |
| Ejective | Fricative | ɸʼ | fʼ | θʼ | sʼ | ʃʼ | ʂʼ | ɕʼ | xʼ | χʼ |
| Ejective | Lateral affricate | | | | tɬʼ | | | c𝼆ʼ | k𝼄ʼ | q𝼄ʼ |
| Ejective | Lateral fricative | | | | ɬʼ | | | | | |
| Click (top: velar; bottom: uvular) | Tenuis | kʘ qʘ | | kǀ qǀ | kǃ qǃ | | k𝼊 q𝼊 | kǂ qǂ | | |
| Click (top: velar; bottom: uvular) | Voiced | ɡʘ ɢʘ | | ɡǀ ɢǀ | ɡǃ ɢǃ | | ɡ𝼊 ɢ𝼊 | ɡǂ ɢǂ | | |
| Click (top: velar; bottom: uvular) | Nasal | ŋʘ ɴʘ | | ŋǀ ɴǀ | ŋǃ ɴǃ | | ŋ𝼊 ɴ𝼊 | ŋǂ ɴǂ | ʞ | |
| Click (top: velar; bottom: uvular) | Tenuis lateral | | | | kǁ qǁ | | | | | |
| Click (top: velar; bottom: uvular) | Voiced lateral | | | | ɡǁ ɢǁ | | | | | |
| Click (top: velar; bottom: uvular) | Nasal lateral | | | | ŋǁ ɴǁ | | | | | |
