= Latin alpha =

Latin letter similar to Alpha

Latin Alpha
- Ɑ ɑ

Usage
- Writing system: Latin script
- Type: alphabetic
- Language of origin: International Phonetic Alphabet, General Alphabet of Cameroon Languages
- Sound values: [ɑ]
- In Unicode: U+2C6D, U+0251

History
Development
F1
        - Α α
          - Ɑ ɑ
- Time period: 1890s to present
- Sisters: A, Ɒ

Other
- Writing direction: Left-to-Right

The letter Latin alpha with a lowercase Greek alpha shape, as in the African reference alphabet or the General Alphabet of Cameroon Languages

Latin alpha (majuscule: Ɑ, minuscule: ɑ), script a, or single-story a is a letter of the Latin alphabet based on a handwritten form of lowercase a, and which is commonly typeset with the Greek lowercase alpha (α).

== Usage ==
Although ⟨ɑ⟩ is normally just an allograph of ⟨a⟩, there are instances in which the two letters are distinguished:

- In the International Phonetic Alphabet, ⟨ɑ⟩ represents an open back unrounded vowel, while ⟨a⟩ represents an open front unrounded vowel. It has the shape of a script-a.
- Also in the General Alphabet of Cameroon Languages, ⟨Ɑ ɑ⟩ usually represents an open back unrounded vowel, while ⟨A a⟩ represents an open front unrounded vowel. The former is used in the orthographies of several languages of Cameroon, including:
  - Feʼfeʼ
  - Mbembe
  - Mbo (?): but not Akoose, though it does have phonemes /aa/ and /ɑɑ/; nor Bakaka.
  - in some languages, the script-a form (also called banana for short) of the letter ⟨A a⟩, with the lowercase much like the IPA ⟨ɑ⟩, is used and should not be confused with the Latin alpha ⟨Ɑ ɑ⟩ of the GACL; for example, in Muyang, the literacy ⟨A a⟩ represents an open-mid central unrounded vowel but it is not ⟨Ɑ ɑ⟩; the Latin alpha is not used.
- In typography, it is sometimes referred to as the single-story a, to distinguish it from double-story a.

In Cameroon languages, lowercase ⟨ɑ⟩ is typeset as a lowercase Greek alpha to better differentiate it from the letter a in script or italic form. The capital is typically typeset as a large Latin script a.

U+1D45 ᵅ MODIFIER LETTER SMALL ALPHA is used in the Uralic Phonetic Alphabet.

U+AB30 ꬰ LATIN SMALL LETTER BARRED ALPHA is used in the Teuthonista phonetic transcription system.

Latin turned alpha is used in IPA

U+AB64 ꭤ LATIN SMALL LETTER INVERTED ALPHA is used in Americanist phonetic notation.

== Typography ==
Latin a, Latin alpha, and Greek alpha, using the fonts: Arial, Times New Roman, Gentium, Doulos SIL, Cambria, Linux Libertine, Andron Mega Corpus, Courier New, and Consolas. Second row: italics, using the same fonts.

== Encoding and forms ==
In Unicode, "Latin alpha" and "Latin script a" are considered to be the same character, which has an uppercase and a lowercase form and is referred to as "Latin letter alpha".

Character information
Preview	Ɑ		ɑ	
Unicode name	LATIN CAPITAL LETTER ALPHA		LATIN SMALL LETTER ALPHA	
Encodings	decimal	hex	dec	hex
Unicode	11373	U+2C6D	593	U+0251
UTF-8	226 177 173	E2 B1 AD	201 145	C9 91
Numeric character reference	&#11373;	&#x2C6D;	&#593;	&#x251;

== See also ==
- Latin turned alpha
- G, which also has two distinct minuscule forms
