= Nick Farmer =

Linguist, writer and constructed language creator

- Occupations: Linguist, writer
- Known for: Creating Belter Creole

Academic background
- Education: Rutgers University; University of California, Berkeley

Nick Farmer is an American science fiction writer and linguist based in Oakland, California, United States. He is a polyglot able to speak in 14 languages. He has created 3 constructed languages for science fiction television series: Belter Creole for The Expanse, and Trill and Barzan for Star Trek: Discovery.

== Youth and education ==
Nick Farmer was inspired to become a linguist by his godfather, Kenneth L. Hale, and his mother, respectively a linguistics teacher at Massachusetts Institute of Technology and his student. As a child, he moved a couple of times, getting to grow up with a few different languages and dialects in his surroundings, eventually making him interested in linguistics. He studied linguistics at the Rutgers University and University of California, Berkeley. He also became a polyglot able to speak in 14 languages.

== Constructed languages ==
Around 2010, while in a bar, he met George R. R. Martin, the author of the A Song of Ice and Fire novel series, who then introduced him to Ty Franck, co-author of The Expanse novel series. Around 2014 and 2015, during the production of the first season of The Expanse television series, Farmer was commissioned to develop Belter Creole, the constructed language of one of the factions in the series. Franck was the one who suggested hiring Farmer.

Inside the universe of the television series set around 200 years in the future, the language is used by Belters, the inhabitants of the asteroid belt and outer planets of the Solar System. The language had developed during the colonization of the Asteroid Belt, firstly starting as the pidgin spoken by people who came to the colonies from Earth speaking various languages from all around the world. Over the following generations, the language developed into the creole.

Developing the language, Farmer modeled it as a creole based on English, with influences from other languages of different language families, including Romance languages such as Spanish, French, Portuguese and Italian, Germanic languages such as German and Swedish, Slavic languages such as Polish, Russian and Ukrainian, as well as Japanese, Chinese, Persian, Arabic, Hebrew, Zulu and others. As the result of his work, Farmer created over 1000 words for his language, adding more to the list if requested by the show's producers and fans.

In 2020, Farmer was commissioned to develop two constructed languages, Trill and Barzan, for the Star Trek: Discovery television series. The languages appeared in 2 episodes of the third season of the show.

== Works ==
- The Survivors: A Novella (2017; novel)
- The Venusian (2018; short story)
