= Open back unrounded vowel =

Vowel sound represented by ⟨ɑ⟩ in IPA

ɑ
- IPA number: 305

Audio sample
- source · help

Encoding
- Entity (decimal): &#593;
- Unicode (hex): U+0251
- X-SAMPA: A
- Braille: ⠡ (braille pattern dots-16)
Image

IPA: Vowels

	Front	Central	Back
Close	i y	ɨ ʉ	ɯ u
Near-close	ɪ ʏ		ʊ
Close-mid	e ø	ɘ ɵ	ɤ o
Mid	e̞ ø̞	ə	ɤ̞ o̞
Open-mid	ɛ œ	ɜ ɞ	ʌ ɔ
Near-open	æ	ɐ
Open	a ɶ	ä	ɑ ɒ

- IPA help
- audio
- full chart
- template

Legend: unrounded • rounded

The open back unrounded vowel, or low back unrounded vowel, is a type of vowel sound, used in some spoken languages. The symbol in the International Phonetic Alphabet that represents this sound is ⟨ɑ⟩. The letter ⟨ɑ⟩ is called script a or handwritten a because it lacks the extra hook on top of a printed letter a, which corresponds to a different vowel, the open front unrounded vowel. Script a, which has a full length linear stroke on its right, should not be confused with turned script a, ⟨ɒ⟩, which has the linear stroke on its left and corresponds to a rounded version of this vowel, the open back rounded vowel.

The open back unrounded vowel is the vocalic equivalent of the pharyngeal approximant [ʕ̞].

== Features ==
- Its vowel height is open, also known as low, which means the tongue is positioned far from the roof of the mouth – that is, low in the mouth.
- Its vowel backness is back, which means the tongue is positioned back in the mouth without creating a constriction that would be classified as a consonant. Unrounded back vowels tend to be centralized, which means that often they are in fact near-back.
- Its place of articulation is pharyngeal, which means it is articulated with the tongue root against the back of the throat (the pharynx).
- It is unrounded, which means that the lips are not rounded.

== Occurrence ==
Language		Word	IPA	Meaning	Notes
Afrikaans	Standard	daar	[dɑːr]	'there'	The quality varies between open near-back unrounded [ɑ̟ː], open back unrounded [ɑː] and even open back rounded [ɒː]. See Afrikaans phonology
Äiwoo		kânongä	[kɑnoŋæ]	'I want'	Roundedness varies between [ɑ] and [ɒ]. Contrasts with [æ] and [a].
Arabic	Standard	طويل (ṭawīl)	[tˤɑˈwiːl]	'tall'	Allophone of long and short /a/ near emphatic consonants, depending on the speaker's accent. See Arabic phonology
Arabic	Essaouira	قال (qāl)	[qɑːl]	'he said'	One of the possible realisations of /ā/.
Armenian	Eastern	հաց (hacʿ)	[hɑt͡sʰ]	'bread'	
Bashkir		ҡаҙ (qađ)	[qɑð]	'goose'	
Catalan	Most dialects	pal	[ˈpɑɫ]	'stick'	Allophone of /a/ in contact with velar consonants. See Catalan phonology
Catalan	Some dialects	mà	[ˈmɑ]	'hand'	More central ([ä] and/or [ɐ]) in other dialects; fully front [a] (or even [æ]) in Majorcan Catalan. See Catalan phonology
Chinese	Mandarin	棒 (bàng)	[pɑŋ˥˩]	'stick'	Allophone of /a/ before /ŋ/. See Standard Chinese phonology
Dutch	Standard	bad	[bɑt]	'bath'	Backness varies among dialects; in the Standard Northern accent it is fully back. In the Standard Belgian accent it is raised and fronted to [ɑ̝̈]. See Dutch phonology
Dutch	Amsterdam	aap	[ɑːp]	'monkey'	Corresponds to [aː ~ äː] in standard Dutch.
Dutch	Antwerp	aap	[ɑːp]	'monkey'	Corresponds to [aː ~ äː] in standard Dutch.
Dutch	Utrecht	aap	[ɑːp]	'monkey'	Corresponds to [aː ~ äː] in standard Dutch.
Dutch	The Hague	nauw	[nɑː]	'narrow'	Corresponds to [ʌu] in standard Dutch.
English	General American	on	[ɑn]	'on'	May be more front [ɑ̟ ~ ä], especially in accents without the cot–caught merger. See English phonology
English	Cockney	palm	[pɑːm]	'palm'	Fully back. It can be more front [ɑ̟ː] instead.
English	General South African	palm	[pɑːm]	'palm'	Fully back. Broad varieties usually produce a rounded vowel [ɒː ~ ɔː] instead, while Cultivated SAE prefers a more front vowel [ɑ̟ː ~ äː]. See South African English phonology
English	Cultivated; South African	palm	[pɑ̟ːm]	'palm'	Typically more front than cardinal [ɑ]. It may be as front as [äː] in some Cultivated South African and southern English speakers. See English phonology and South African English phonology
English	Received Pronunciation	palm	[pɑ̟ːm]	'palm'	Typically more front than cardinal [ɑ]. It may be as front as [äː] in some Cultivated South African and southern English speakers. See English phonology and South African English phonology
English	Non-local Dublin	back	[bɑq]	'back'	Allophone of /a/ before velars for some speakers.
Faroese	Some dialects	vátur	[ˈvɑːtʊɹ]	'wet'	Corresponds to /ɔɑ/ in standard language. See Faroese phonology
French	Conservative Parisian	pas	[pɑ]	'not'	Contrasts with /a/, but many speakers have only one open vowel [ä]. See French phonology
French	Quebec	pâte	[pɑːt]	'paste'	Contrasts with /a/. See Quebec French phonology
Galician		irmán	[iɾˈmɑŋ]	'brother'	Allophone of /a/ in contact with velar consonants. See Galician phonology
Georgian		გუდა (guda)	[k̬ud̪ɑ]	'leather bag'	Usually not fully back [ɑ], typically [ɑ̟] to [ä]. Sometimes transcribed as /a/.
German	Standard	Gourmand	[ɡ̊ʊʁˈmɑ̃ː]	'gourmand'	Nasalized; often realized as rounded [ɒ̃ː]. See Standard German phonology
German	Many speakers	nah	[nɑː]	'near'	Used by speakers in Northern Germany, East Central Germany, Franconia and Switzerland. Also a part of the Standard Austrian accent. More front in other accents. See Standard German phonology
Greek	Sfakian	μπύρα (býra)	[ˈbirɑ]	"beer"	Corresponds to central [ä ~ ɐ] in Modern Standard Greek. See Modern Greek phonology
Hindustani	Hindi	ख़ास/khas	[xɑːs]	'special'	Allophone of [aː ~ ä]. More likely to be heard in serious speech or poetry. See Hindustani phonology.
Hindustani	Urdu	خاص/khas	[xɑːs]	'special'	Allophone of [aː ~ ä]. More likely to be heard in serious speech or poetry. See Hindustani phonology.
Hungarian	Some dialects	magyar	[ˈmɑɟɑr]	'Hungarian'	Weakly rounded [ɒ] in standard Hungarian. See Hungarian phonology
Inuit	West Greenlandic	oqarpoq	[ɔˈqɑpːɔq̚]	'he says'	Allophone of /a/ before and especially between uvulars. See Inuit phonology
Italian	Some Piedmont dialects	casa	[ˈkɑːzɑ]	'house'	Allophone of /a/ which in Italian is largely realised as central [ä].
Irish	Munster Dialect	áit	[ɑːtʲ]	'place'	See Irish phonology
Kaingang		ga	[ᵑɡɑ]	'land, soil'	Varies between back [ɑ] and central [ɐ].
Khmer		ស្ករ (skâr)	[skɑː]	'sugar'	See Khmer phonology
Low German		al / aal	[ɑːl]	'all'	Backness may vary among dialects.
Malay	Kedah	mata	[ma.tɑ]	'eye'	See Malay phonology
Malay	Kelantan-Pattani	mata	[ma.tɑ]	'eye'	Allophone of syllable-final /a/ in open-ended words and before /k/ and /h/ codas. See Kelantan-Pattani Malay
Malay	Standard	qari	[qɑ.ri]	'qari'	Found only in certain Arabic loanwords and used by speakers who know Arabic. Normally replaced by [ä]. See Malay phonology
Norwegian		hat	[hɑːt]	'hate'	The example word is from Urban East Norwegian. Central [äː] in some other dialects. See Norwegian phonology
Portuguese	Some Azorean dialects	nada	[ˈnɑðɐ]	'nothing'	See Portuguese phonology
Portuguese	Paulista	vegetal	[veʒeˈtɑw]	'vegetable'	Only immediately before [w].
Russian		палка (palka)	[ˈpɑɫkə]	'stick'	Occurs only before the hard /l/, but not when a palatalized consonant precedes. See Russian phonology
Scottish Gaelic	Lewis	balach	[ˈpɑl̪ˠəx]	'boy'	Allophone of [a] in proximity to broad sonorants.
Sema		amqa	[à̠mqɑ̀]	'lower back'	Possible realization of /a/ after uvular stops.
Swedish	Some dialects	jag	[jɑːɡ]	'I'	Weakly rounded [ɒ̜ː] in Central Standard Swedish. See Swedish phonology
Turkish		at	[ɑt̪]	'horse'	Also described as central [ä]. See Turkish phonology
Ukrainian		мати (maty)	[ˈmɑtɪ]	'mother'	See Ukrainian phonology
Vietnamese	Some dialects in North Central and Central	gà	[ɣɑ˨˩]	'chicken'	See Vietnamese phonology
West Frisian	Standard	lang	[ɫɑŋ]	'long'	Also described as central [ä]. See West Frisian phonology
West Frisian	Aastersk	maat	[mɑːt]	'mate'	Contrasts with a front /aː/. See West Frisian phonology

== Near-open back unrounded vowel ==
Near-open back unrounded vowel

ɑ̝

ʌ̞

In some languages (such as Azerbaijani, Estonian, Luxembourgish and Toda) there is the near-open back unrounded vowel (a sound between cardinal ⟨ɑ⟩ and ⟨ʌ⟩), which can be transcribed in IPA with [ɑ̝] or [ʌ̞].

=== Features ===
- Its vowel height is near-open, also known as near-low, which means the tongue is positioned similarly to an open vowel, but is slightly more constricted – that is, the tongue is positioned similarly to a low vowel, but slightly higher.
- Its vowel backness is back, which means the tongue is positioned back in the mouth without creating a constriction that would be classified as a consonant. Unrounded back vowels tend to be centralized, which means that often they are in fact near-back.
- Its place of articulation is pharyngeal, which means it is articulated with the tongue root against the back of the throat (the pharynx).
- It is unrounded, which means that the lips are not rounded.

=== Occurrence ===
Language		Word	IPA	Meaning	Notes
Azerbaijani		qardaş	[ɡɑ̝ɾˈd̪ɑ̝ʃ]	'brother'	Near-open.
Catalan	Mallorcan (some accents)	lloc	[ˈʎ̟ɑ̝k]	'place'	Unrounded allophone of /ɔ/ ([ɒ̝]) in some accents. It can be centralized. See Catalan phonology
Catalan	Valencian (some accents)	lloc	[ˈʎ̟ɑ̝k]	'place'	Unrounded allophone of /ɔ/ ([ɒ̝]) in some accents. It can be centralized. See Catalan phonology
Catalan	Southern Valencian (Alacantí)	bou	[ˈbɑ̝w]	'bull'	Pronunciation of the vowel /ɔ/ ([ɒ̝]) before [w]. It can be centralized. See Catalan phonology
Dutch	Leiden	bad	[bɑ̝t]	'bath'	Near-open fully back; can be rounded [ɒ̝] instead. See Dutch phonology
Dutch	Rotterdam	bad	[bɑ̝t]	'bath'	Near-open fully back; can be rounded [ɒ̝] instead. See Dutch phonology
English	Cardiff	hot	[hɑ̽t]	'hot'	Somewhat raised and fronted.
English	Norfolk	hot	[hɑ̽t]	'hot'	Somewhat raised and fronted.
Estonian		vale	[ˈvɑ̝le̞ˑ]	'lie'	Near-open. See Estonian phonology
Finnish		kana	[ˈkɑ̝nɑ̝]	'hen'	Near-open, also described as open central [ä]. See Finnish phonology
Kazakh		алма (alma)	[ɑ̝ɫ̪ˈmɑ̝]	'apple'	Can be realised as near-open.
Limburgish	Maastrichtian	bats	[bɑ̽ts]	'buttock'	The quality varies between open back [ɑ], open near-back [ɑ̟], and near-open near-back [ɑ̽], depending on the dialect.
Luxembourgish		Kapp	[kʰɑ̝p]	'head'	Near-open fully back. See Luxembourgish phonology
Toda		[ɑ̝ːn]		'elephant'	Near-open.

== See also ==
- Index of phonetics articles
- Latin alpha

== Notes ==
Place →	Labial					Coronal										Dorsal					Laryngeal			
Manner ↓	Bilabial		Labiodental		Linguolabial		Dental		Alveolar		Postalveolar		Retroflex		(Alveolo-)palatal		Velar		Uvular		Pharyngeal/epiglottal		Glottal	
Nasal	m̥	m	ɱ̊	ɱ		n̼	n̪̊	n̪	n̥	n	n̠̊	n̠	ɳ̊	ɳ	ɲ̊	ɲ	ŋ̊	ŋ	ɴ̥	ɴ				
Plosive	p	b	p̪	b̪	t̼	d̼	t̪	d̪	t	d			ʈ	ɖ	c	ɟ	k	ɡ	q	ɢ	ʡ		ʔ	
Sibilant affricate							t̪s̪	d̪z̪	ts	dz	t̠ʃ	d̠ʒ	tʂ	dʐ	tɕ	dʑ								
Non-sibilant affricate	pɸ	bβ	p̪f	b̪v			t̪θ	d̪ð	tɹ̝̊	dɹ̝	t̠ɹ̠̊˔	d̠ɹ̠˔			cç	ɟʝ	kx	ɡɣ	qχ	ɢʁ	ʡʜ	ʡʢ	ʔh	
Sibilant fricative							s̪	z̪	s	z	ʃ	ʒ	ʂ	ʐ	ɕ	ʑ								
Non-sibilant fricative	ɸ	β	f	v	θ̼	ð̼	θ	ð	θ̠	ð̠	ɹ̠̊˔	ɹ̠˔	ɻ̊˔	ɻ˔	ç	ʝ	x	ɣ	χ	ʁ	ħ	ʕ	h	ɦ
Approximant		β̞		ʋ				ð̞		ɹ		ɹ̠		ɻ		j		ɰ						˷
Tap/flap		ⱱ̟		ⱱ					ɾ̥	ɾ			ɽ̊	ɽ						ɢ̆		ʡ̆		
Trill	ʙ̥	ʙ							r̥	r		r̠	ɽ̊r̥	ɽr					ʀ̥	ʀ	ʜ	ʢ		
Lateral affricate									tɬ	dɮ			tꞎ	d𝼅	c𝼆	ɟʎ̝	k𝼄	ɡʟ̝						
Lateral fricative							ɬ̪		ɬ	ɮ			ꞎ	𝼅	𝼆	ʎ̝	𝼄	ʟ̝						
Lateral approximant								l̪	l̥	l		l̠	ɭ̊	ɭ	ʎ̥	ʎ	ʟ̥	ʟ		ʟ̠				
Lateral tap/flap									ɺ̥	ɺ			𝼈̊	𝼈		ʎ̆		ʟ̆						

		BL	LD	D	A	PA	RF	P	V	U
Implosive	Voiced	ɓ			ɗ		ᶑ	ʄ	ɠ	ʛ
Implosive	Voiceless	ɓ̥			ɗ̥		ᶑ̊	ʄ̊	ɠ̊	ʛ̥
Ejective	Stop	pʼ			tʼ		ʈʼ	cʼ	kʼ	qʼ
Ejective	Affricate		p̪fʼ	tθʼ	tsʼ	tʃʼ	tʂʼ	tɕʼ	kxʼ	qχʼ
Ejective	Fricative	ɸʼ	fʼ	θʼ	sʼ	ʃʼ	ʂʼ	ɕʼ	xʼ	χʼ
Ejective	Lateral affricate				tɬʼ			c𝼆ʼ	k𝼄ʼ	q𝼄ʼ
Ejective	Lateral fricative				ɬʼ					
Click (top: velar; bottom: uvular)	Tenuis	kʘ qʘ		kǀ qǀ	kǃ qǃ		k𝼊 q𝼊	kǂ qǂ		
Click (top: velar; bottom: uvular)	Voiced	ɡʘ ɢʘ		ɡǀ ɢǀ	ɡǃ ɢǃ		ɡ𝼊 ɢ𝼊	ɡǂ ɢǂ		
Click (top: velar; bottom: uvular)	Nasal	ŋʘ ɴʘ		ŋǀ ɴǀ	ŋǃ ɴǃ		ŋ𝼊 ɴ𝼊	ŋǂ ɴǂ	ʞ	
Click (top: velar; bottom: uvular)	Tenuis lateral				kǁ qǁ					
Click (top: velar; bottom: uvular)	Voiced lateral				ɡǁ ɢǁ					
Click (top: velar; bottom: uvular)	Nasal lateral				ŋǁ ɴǁ					
