= Open back rounded vowel =

Vowel sound represented by ⟨ɒ⟩ in IPA

ɒ
- IPA number: 313

Audio sample
- source · help

Encoding
- Entity (decimal): &#594;
- Unicode (hex): U+0252
- X-SAMPA: Q
- Braille: ⠲ (braille pattern dots-256) ⠡ (braille pattern dots-16)
Image

IPA: Vowels

	Front	Central	Back
Close	i y	ɨ ʉ	ɯ u
Near-close	ɪ ʏ		ʊ
Close-mid	e ø	ɘ ɵ	ɤ o
Mid	e̞ ø̞	ə	ɤ̞ o̞
Open-mid	ɛ œ	ɜ ɞ	ʌ ɔ
Near-open	æ	ɐ
Open	a ɶ	ä	ɑ ɒ

- IPA help
- audio
- full chart
- template

Legend: unrounded • rounded

The open back rounded vowel, or low back rounded vowel, is a type of vowel sound, used in some spoken languages. The symbol in the International Phonetic Alphabet that represents this sound is ⟨ɒ⟩. Latin turned alpha a ⟨ɒ⟩ has its linear stroke on the left, whereas Latin alpha a ⟨ɑ⟩ (for its unrounded counterpart) has its linear stroke on the right.

== Features ==
- Its vowel height is open, also known as low, which means the tongue is positioned far from the roof of the mouth – that is, low in the mouth.
- Its vowel backness is back, which means the tongue is positioned back in the mouth without creating a constriction that would be classified as a consonant.
- Its place of articulation is pharyngeal, which means it is articulated with the tongue root against the back of the throat (the pharynx).
- It is rounded, which means that the lips are rounded rather than spread or relaxed.

== Occurrence ==
Language		Word	IPA	Meaning	Notes
Afrikaans	Standard	daar	[dɒːr]	'there'	Fully back. Used by some speakers, particularly young female speakers of northern accents. Other speakers use an unrounded vowel [ɑː ~ ɑ̟ː]. See Afrikaans phonology
Assamese		কৰ (kor)	[kɒ̹ɹ]	'to do'	An "over-rounded" [ɒ̹], with rounding as strong as that for [u]. May also be transcribed [ɔ].
Bulgarian	Some Rhodopean dialects	мъж (măž)	[ˈmɒʃʲ]	'man'	Found as the unification of the Proto-Slavic *ǫ, *ę, *ъ and *ь. Standard Bulgarian has /ɤ̞/ for *ǫ and *ъ and /ɛ/ for *ę and *ь.
Dutch	Some dialects	bot	[bɒt]	'bone'	Some non-Randstad dialects, for example those of Den Bosch and Groningen. It is open-mid [ɔ] in standard Dutch.
English	South African	not	[nɒ̜̈t]	'not'	Near-back and weakly rounded. Some younger speakers of the General variety may actually have a higher and fully unrounded vowel [ʌ̈]. See South African English phonology
English	Conservative Received Pronunciation	not	[nɒt]	'not'	Somewhat raised. Standard Southern British speakers pronounce a closer vowel [ɔ]. It is proposed that the /ɒ/ vowel of Conservative RP, which is normally described as a rounded vowel, is pronounced by some speakers without rounded lips for whom the characteristic quality is rather one of sulcality. See English phonology
English	Northern English	not	[nɒt]	'not'	May be somewhat raised and fronted.
English	Canadian	not	[nɒt]	'not'	Lot and thought have the same vowel in Canadian English; see cot–caught merger.
English	Canadian	thought	[θɒt]	'thought'	Lot and thought have the same vowel in Canadian English; see cot–caught merger.
English	General American	thought	[θɒt]	'thought'	Vowel /ɔ(:)/ is lowered (phonetic realization of /ɔ(:)/ is much lower in GA than in RP). However, "short o" before r before a vowel (a short o sound followed by r and then another vowel, as in orange, forest, moral, and warrant) is realized as [oɹ~ɔɹ].
English	Inland Northern American	thought	[θɒt]	'thought'	See Northern Cities Vowel Shift
English	Indian	thought	[t̪ʰɒʈ]	'thought'	/ɒ/ and /ɔː/ differ entirely by length in Indian English.
English	Welsh	thought	[θɒːt]	'thought'	Open-mid in Cardiff; may merge with /oː/ in northern dialects.
German	Many speakers	Gourmand	[ɡ̊ʊʁˈmɒ̃ː]	'gourmand'	Nasalized; common phonetic realization of /ɑ̃ː/. See Standard German phonology
German	Many Swiss dialects	maane	[ˈmɒːnə]	'remind'	The example word is from the Zurich dialect, in which [ɒː] is in free variation with the unrounded [ɑː].
Istro-Romanian		cåp	[kɒp]	'head'	See Istro-Romanian pronunciation (in Romanian).
Jeju		ᄒᆞ나 (haona)	[hɒna]	'one'	See Jeju phonology
Malay	Kedah	tua	[tu.ɒ]	'old'	Northern Kedah subdialect/dialect. Allophone of /a/ in word-final position in open-ended words and close-ended words that end with a glottal stop /ʔ/ or a glottal fricative /h/.
Mansi	Central/Northern	ам	[ɒm]	'me'	The pronunciation of 'a' sometimes varies between /ɒ/ and /o/.
Neapolitan	Vastese	uâʃtə	[uˈwɒʃtə]	'Vasto'	
Norwegian	Dialects along the Swedish border	hat	[hɒ̜ːt]	'hate'	Weakly rounded and fully back. See Norwegian phonology
Persian		ف‍‍ارسی (fârsi)	[fɒːɾˈsiː]	'Persian'	
Brazilian Portuguese	Carioca	ova	[ˈɒːva]	'fish roe'	Allophone of /ɔ/. See Portuguese phonology
Slovak	Some speakers	a	[ɒ]	'and'	Under Hungarian influence, some speakers realize the short /a/ as rounded. See Slovak phonology
Swedish	Gothenburg	jag	[jɒːɡ]	'I'	More rounded than in Central Standard Swedish.
Uzbek	Standard	choy	[t͡ʃɒj]	'tea'	

== Near-open back rounded vowel ==
Near-open back rounded vowel

ɒ̝

ɔ̞

In some languages there is the near-open back rounded vowel (a sound between cardinal ⟨ɒ⟩ and ⟨ɔ⟩), which can be transcribed in IPA with [ɒ̝] or [ɔ̞].

=== Features ===
- Its vowel height is near-open, also known as near-low, which means the tongue is positioned similarly to an open vowel, but is slightly more constricted – that is, the tongue is positioned similarly to a low vowel, but slightly higher.
- Its vowel backness is back, which means the tongue is positioned back in the mouth without creating a constriction that would be classified as a consonant.
- Its place of articulation is pharyngeal, which means it is articulated with the tongue root against the back of the throat (the pharynx).
- It is rounded, which means that the lips are rounded rather than spread or relaxed.

=== Occurrence ===
Language		Word	IPA	Meaning	Notes
Catalan	Many Balearic speakers	soc	[ˈs̺ɒ̝k]	'clog'	Main realization of /ɔ/ (also represented as /ɒ/). May be unrounded [ɑ̝] in Mallorcan and some Southern Valencian dialects. See Catalan phonology
Catalan	Valencian	soc	[ˈs̺ɒ̝k]	'clog'	Main realization of /ɔ/ (also represented as /ɒ/). May be unrounded [ɑ̝] in Mallorcan and some Southern Valencian dialects. See Catalan phonology
Catalan	Valencian	corda	[ˈkɒ̝ɾðɒ̝̈]	'rope'	Final unstressed /a/ (usually involving vowel harmony). Can be realized as either unrounded and/or fronted. See Catalan phonology
Dutch	Leiden	bad	[bɒ̝t]	'bath'	Near-open fully back; may be unrounded [ɑ̝] instead. It corresponds to [ɑ] in standard Dutch.
Dutch	Rotterdam	bad	[bɒ̝t]	'bath'	Near-open fully back; may be unrounded [ɑ̝] instead. It corresponds to [ɑ] in standard Dutch.
Hungarian	Standard	magyar	[ˈmɒ̜̽ɟɒ̜̽r]	'Hungarian'	Somewhat fronted and raised, with only slight rounding; sometimes transcribed in IPA with ⟨ɔ⟩. Unrounded [ɑ] in some dialects. See Hungarian phonology
Ibibio		dọ	[dɒ̝́]	'marry'	Near-open; typically transcribed in IPA with ⟨ɔ⟩.
Irish	Ulster	ólann	[ɒ̝ːɫ̪ən̪ˠ]	'(he) drinks'	Near-open; may be transcribed in IPA with ⟨ɔː⟩.
Lehali		dön̄	[ⁿdɒ̝ŋ]	'yam'	Raised vowel, being the back rounded counterpart of /æ/ in a symmetrical vowel inventory.
Lemerig		‘ān̄sār	[ʔɒ̝ŋsɒ̝r]	'person'	Raised vowel, being the back rounded counterpart of /æ/ in a symmetrical vowel inventory.
Limburgish	Maastrichtian	plaots	[plɒ̝ːts]	'place'	Near-open fully back; typically transcribed in IPA with ⟨ɔː⟩. Corresponds to [ɔː] in other dialects.
Norwegian	Urban East	topp	[tʰɒ̝pː]	'top'	Near-open, also described as close-mid back [o]. Typically transcribed in IPA with ⟨ɔ⟩. See Norwegian phonology
Swedish	Central Standard	ska	[s̪kɒ̝͑ː]	'be going to'	Near-open fully back weakly rounded vowel. Typically transcribed in IPA with ⟨ɑː⟩. See Swedish phonology
Yoruba		itọju	[itɒ̝ju]	'care'	Near-open; most often transcribed in IPA with ⟨ɔ⟩.

== See also ==
- Turned a
- Index of phonetics articles

== Notes ==
Place →	Labial					Coronal										Dorsal					Laryngeal			
Manner ↓	Bilabial		Labiodental		Linguolabial		Dental		Alveolar		Postalveolar		Retroflex		(Alveolo-)palatal		Velar		Uvular		Pharyngeal/epiglottal		Glottal	
Nasal	m̥	m	ɱ̊	ɱ		n̼	n̪̊	n̪	n̥	n	n̠̊	n̠	ɳ̊	ɳ	ɲ̊	ɲ	ŋ̊	ŋ	ɴ̥	ɴ				
Plosive	p	b	p̪	b̪	t̼	d̼	t̪	d̪	t	d			ʈ	ɖ	c	ɟ	k	ɡ	q	ɢ	ʡ		ʔ	
Sibilant affricate							t̪s̪	d̪z̪	ts	dz	t̠ʃ	d̠ʒ	tʂ	dʐ	tɕ	dʑ								
Non-sibilant affricate	pɸ	bβ	p̪f	b̪v			t̪θ	d̪ð	tɹ̝̊	dɹ̝	t̠ɹ̠̊˔	d̠ɹ̠˔			cç	ɟʝ	kx	ɡɣ	qχ	ɢʁ	ʡʜ	ʡʢ	ʔh	
Sibilant fricative							s̪	z̪	s	z	ʃ	ʒ	ʂ	ʐ	ɕ	ʑ								
Non-sibilant fricative	ɸ	β	f	v	θ̼	ð̼	θ	ð	θ̠	ð̠	ɹ̠̊˔	ɹ̠˔	ɻ̊˔	ɻ˔	ç	ʝ	x	ɣ	χ	ʁ	ħ	ʕ	h	ɦ
Approximant		β̞		ʋ				ð̞		ɹ		ɹ̠		ɻ		j		ɰ						˷
Tap/flap		ⱱ̟		ⱱ					ɾ̥	ɾ			ɽ̊	ɽ						ɢ̆		ʡ̆		
Trill	ʙ̥	ʙ							r̥	r		r̠	ɽ̊r̥	ɽr					ʀ̥	ʀ	ʜ	ʢ		
Lateral affricate									tɬ	dɮ			tꞎ	d𝼅	c𝼆	ɟʎ̝	k𝼄	ɡʟ̝						
Lateral fricative							ɬ̪		ɬ	ɮ			ꞎ	𝼅	𝼆	ʎ̝	𝼄	ʟ̝						
Lateral approximant								l̪	l̥	l		l̠	ɭ̊	ɭ	ʎ̥	ʎ	ʟ̥	ʟ		ʟ̠				
Lateral tap/flap									ɺ̥	ɺ			𝼈̊	𝼈		ʎ̆		ʟ̆						

		BL	LD	D	A	PA	RF	P	V	U
Implosive	Voiced	ɓ			ɗ		ᶑ	ʄ	ɠ	ʛ
Implosive	Voiceless	ɓ̥			ɗ̥		ᶑ̊	ʄ̊	ɠ̊	ʛ̥
Ejective	Stop	pʼ			tʼ		ʈʼ	cʼ	kʼ	qʼ
Ejective	Affricate		p̪fʼ	tθʼ	tsʼ	tʃʼ	tʂʼ	tɕʼ	kxʼ	qχʼ
Ejective	Fricative	ɸʼ	fʼ	θʼ	sʼ	ʃʼ	ʂʼ	ɕʼ	xʼ	χʼ
Ejective	Lateral affricate				tɬʼ			c𝼆ʼ	k𝼄ʼ	q𝼄ʼ
Ejective	Lateral fricative				ɬʼ					
Click (top: velar; bottom: uvular)	Tenuis	kʘ qʘ		kǀ qǀ	kǃ qǃ		k𝼊 q𝼊	kǂ qǂ		
Click (top: velar; bottom: uvular)	Voiced	ɡʘ ɢʘ		ɡǀ ɢǀ	ɡǃ ɢǃ		ɡ𝼊 ɢ𝼊	ɡǂ ɢǂ		
Click (top: velar; bottom: uvular)	Nasal	ŋʘ ɴʘ		ŋǀ ɴǀ	ŋǃ ɴǃ		ŋ𝼊 ɴ𝼊	ŋǂ ɴǂ	ʞ	
Click (top: velar; bottom: uvular)	Tenuis lateral				kǁ qǁ					
Click (top: velar; bottom: uvular)	Voiced lateral				ɡǁ ɢǁ					
Click (top: velar; bottom: uvular)	Nasal lateral				ŋǁ ɴǁ					
