= Near-open central vowel =

Vowel sound represented by ⟨ɐ⟩ in IPA

ɐ
- IPA number: 324

Audio sample
- source · help

Encoding
- Entity (decimal): &#592;
- Unicode (hex): U+0250
- X-SAMPA: 6
- Braille: ⠲ (braille pattern dots-256) ⠁ (braille pattern dots-1)
Image

IPA: Vowels

| | Front | Central | Back |
|---|---|---|---|
| Close | i y | ɨ ʉ | ɯ u |
| Near-close | ɪ ʏ | | ʊ |
| Close-mid | e ø | ɘ ɵ | ɤ o |
| Mid | e̞ ø̞ | ə | ɤ̞ o̞ |
| Open-mid | ɛ œ | ɜ ɞ | ʌ ɔ |
| Near-open | æ | ɐ |
| Open | a ɶ | ä | ɑ ɒ |

- IPA help
- audio
- full chart
- template

Legend: unrounded • rounded

The near-open central vowel, or near-low central vowel, is a type of vowel sound, used in some spoken languages. The symbol in the International Phonetic Alphabet that represents this sound is ⟨ɐ⟩, a rotated lowercase double-story a. Both the symbol and the sound are sometimes referred to as a-schwa.

In English this vowel is most typically transcribed with the symbol ⟨ʌ⟩, i.e. as if it were open-mid back. That pronunciation is still found in some dialects, but many speakers use a central vowel like [ɐ] or [ɜ]. To avoid the trap–strut merger, Standard Southern British English is moving away from the [ɐ] quality towards [ʌ] found in RP spoken in the first half of the 20th century (e.g. in Daniel Jones's speech).

Much like ⟨ə⟩, ⟨ɐ⟩ is a versatile symbol that is not defined for roundedness and that can be used for vowels that are near-open central, near-open near-front, near-open near-back, open-mid central, open central or an (often unstressed) vowel with variable height, backness and/or roundedness that is produced in that general area. For open central unrounded vowels transcribed with ⟨ɐ⟩, see open central unrounded vowel.

When the usual transcription of the near-open near-front and the near-open near-back variants is different from ⟨ɐ⟩, they are listed in near-open front unrounded vowel and open back unrounded vowel or open back rounded vowel, respectively.

The near-open central unrounded vowel is sometimes the only open vowel in a language and then is typically transcribed with ⟨a⟩.

== Features ==
- Its vowel height is near-open, also known as near-low, which means the tongue is positioned similarly to an open vowel, but is slightly more constricted – that is, the tongue is positioned similarly to a low vowel, but slightly higher.
- Its vowel backness is central, which means the tongue is positioned halfway between a front vowel and a back vowel.
- It is undefined for roundedness, which means that it can be either rounded or unrounded. In practice however, the unrounded variant is more common.

== Occurrence ==
Near-open central unrounded vowel

ɜ̞

Audio sample
- source · help

Near-open central rounded vowel

ɞ̞

Audio sample
- source · help

In the following list, ⟨ɐ⟩ is assumed to be unrounded, though this can also be transcribed as ⟨ɜ̞⟩ or ⟨ɐ̜⟩. The rounded variant is transcribed as ⟨ɞ̞⟩ or ⟨ɐ̹⟩. Both latter cases may be somewhat misleading, as like [ə], roundedness is not specified for [ɐ]. Some instances of the rounded vowel may actually be fully open.

| Language | | Word | IPA | Meaning | Notes |
|---|---|---|---|---|---|
| Adyghe | | сэ (să) | [sɐ] | 'I' | Varies between near-open and open-mid [ɜ]. See Adyghe phonology |
| Bengali | | দেওয়া (dewa) | [d̪ewɐ] | 'give' | Typically transcribed in IPA with ⟨a⟩. See Bengali phonology |
| Bulgarian | | пара (para) | [pɐˈra] | 'coin' | Unstressed allophone of /ɤ/ and /a/. May be transcribed in IPA with ⟨ə⟩. See Bulgarian phonology |
| Arakanese | | မက် (mak) | [mɐʔ] | 'vertical' | Allophone of /a/ in syllables closed by a glottal stop and when nasalized; realized as fully open [ä] in open oral syllables. |
| Catalan | Barcelonan | ara | [ˈäɾɐ] | 'now' | Reduced vowel. Corresponds to [ə] in other Eastern dialects (except Algherese). See Catalan phonology |
| Catalan | Valencian | ara | [ˈäɾɐ] | 'now' | General pronunciation of unstressed /a/ (also found in Ribagorçan). It may be lower ([ä]), especially in stressed syllables. See Catalan phonology |
| Chinese | Cantonese | 心 (sam1) | [sɐ̝m˥] | 'heart' | Open-mid. See Cantonese phonology |
| Chinese | Shanghainese | 砍 | [kɐʔ˦] | 'to cut' | Appears only in closed syllables; the exact height and backness is somewhat variable. |
| Danish | | fatter | [ˈfætɐ] | 'understands' | Typically realized the same as /ɔ/, i.e. [ɒ̽]. Other possible realizations are [ɐ] and [ə̠]. See Danish phonology |
| Dinka | Luanyjang | laŋ | [lɐ́ŋ] | 'berry' | Short allophone of /a/; varies between near-open [ɐ] and open-mid [ɐ̝]. |
| Emilian | | Bulåggna | [buˈlʌɲːɐ] | 'Bologna' | Centralized /a/. |
| English | California | nut | [nɐt] | 'nut' | See English phonology |
| English | Cockney | nut | [nɐ̟ʔ] | 'nut' | Near-front. |
| English | East Anglian | nut | [nɐʔ] | 'nut' | Used in some places (e.g. Colchester) instead of the traditional [ʌ]. |
| English | New Zealand | nut | [nɐʔt] | 'nut' | One realization of /a/ and /aː/ (corresponding to /ʌ/ and /ɑː/ respectively in other dialects). Varies between near-open near-front [ɐ̟], near-open central [ɐ], open near-front [a̠] and open central [ɐ̞]. See New Zealand English phonology |
| English | Received Pronunciation | nut | [nɐʔt] | 'nut' | Increasingly retracted to [ʌ] to avoid the trap-strut merger. See English phonology |
| English | Inland Northern American | bet | [bɐt] | 'bet' | Variation of /ɛ/ used in some places whose accents have undergone the Northern Cities Vowel Shift. |
| English | Middle Class London | lot | [lɐ̹ʔt] | 'lot' | Rounded; can be back [ɒ] instead. See English phonology |
| English | Australian | comma | [ˈkɔmɐ] | 'comma' | Alternatively lowered from word-final [ə]. See Australian English phonology |
| Galician | | feita | [ˈfejt̪ɐ] | 'done' | Realization of final unstressed /a/. See Galician phonology |
| German | Standard | Oper | [ˈoːpɐ] | 'opera' | The exact height, backness and roundedness is somewhere between [ä] and [ɔ], depending on the environment. Sometimes, an opening diphthong of the [əɐ̯]-type is used instead. In Northern Standard German, the short [ä] is raised to [ɐ] when unstressed, rendering Opa 'grandpa' homophonous with Oper. See Standard German phonology |
| German | Regional northern accents | kommen | [ˈkʰɐmən] | 'to come' | Varies between central [ɐ] and back [ɑ]; corresponds to an open-mid rounded [ɔ] in Standard German. See Standard German phonology |
| Greek | Modern Standard | ακακία (akakía) | [ɐkɐˈc̠i.ɐ] | 'acacia' | Most often transcribed in IPA with ⟨a⟩. See Modern Greek phonology |
| Hausa | | | | | Possible allophone of /a/, which can be as close as [ə] and as open as [ä]. |
| Hindustani | | दस / دَس (das) | [ˈd̪ɐs] | 'ten' | Common realization of /ə/. See Hindustani phonology |
| Korean | | 하나 (hana) | [hɐnɐ] | 'one' | Typically transcribed in IPA with ⟨a⟩. See Korean phonology |
| Kumzari | | گپ (gap) | [ɡɐ̟p] | 'large' | Near-front. |
| Limburgish | Maastrichtian | väöl | [vɐ̹ːl] | 'much' | Rounded; contrasts with the open-mid [ɞː] in words with Accent 2 ([ɐ̹ː] itself is always toneless). It may be transcribed in IPA with ⟨ɶː⟩, as it is a phonological front vowel. |
| Limburgish | Venlo dialect | aan | [ˈɐːn] | 'on' | Corresponds to [aː] in other dialects. |
| Lithuanian | | kas | [kɐs̪] | 'what' | See Lithuanian phonology |
| Luxembourgish | | Kanner | [ˈkʰɑnɐ̠] | 'children' | Near-back. See Luxembourgish phonology |
| Malayalam | | പത്ത് | [pɐt̪ːɨ̆] | 'ten' | See Malayalam phonology |
| Mapudungun | | karü | [ˈkɐ̝ʐɘ̝] | 'green' | Open-mid; often transcribed in IPA with ⟨a⟩. |
| Norwegian | Østfold dialect | bada | [ˈbɐ̹̂ːdɐ] | 'to bathe' | Occurs with both rounded [ɐ̹] and unrounded [ɐ] variants, as shown in the example word. |
| Ossetian | Iron | ӕвзаг / ævzag | [ɐvˈz̠äk] | 'language' | Common sound in the Iron dialect. In the Digor dialect, this sound is replaced by an open-mid back unrounded vowel. |
| Piedmontese | Eastern Piedmont | pauta | [ˈpɑwtɐ] | 'mud' | Common realization of final unstressed /a/. |
| Portuguese | | aja | [ˈäʒɐ] | 'act' (subj.) | Closer [ɐ̝] in European Portuguese than in Brazilian Portuguese ([ɐ]). See Portuguese phonology |
| Punjabi | | ਖੰਡ / کھنڈ | [ˈkʰɐ̌ɳɖᵊ] | 'sugar' | Common realization of /ə/, the inherent vowel of Punjabi. See Punjabi phonology |
| Punjabi | | ਪਊਆ / پوّا | [pɐwːä] | 'metric half pint' | Can occur as realization of tense /i/ or /u/ in some contexts followed by a geminate semi-vowel. |
| Romanian | Moldavian dialects | bărbat | [bɐrˈbat] | 'man' | Corresponds to [ə] in standard Romanian. See Romanian phonology |
| Russian | Standard Moscow | голова (golova) | [ɡəɫ̪ɐˈvä] | 'head' | Corresponds to [ʌ] in standard Saint Petersburg pronunciation; occurs mostly immediately before stressed syllables and allophone of [ɑ]. See Russian phonology |
| Sabiny | | | | | Contrasts overshort unrounded and overshort rounded near-open central vowels. |
| Sanskrit | | दिवसः (divasaḥ) | [d̪iʋɐsɐh] | 'day' | See Sanskrit phonology |
| Spanish | Some Latin American accents | rata | [ˈrät̪ɐ] | 'rat' | Found in Mexican and Andean Spanish, especially Colombian (from Bogotá). Unstresssed /a/ varies between [ə] and [ɐ]. See Spanish phonology |
| Ukrainian | | слива (slyva) | [ˈslɪwɐ] | 'plum' | See Ukrainian phonology |
| Vietnamese | | chếch | [cɐ̆jk̚] | 'slanted, oblique' | Typically transcribed in IPA with ⟨ə̆⟩. See Vietnamese phonology |
| Xumi | | [tsʰɐ˦] | | 'salt' | Near-open [ɐ] in Lower Xumi, open-mid [ɐ̝] in Upper Xumi. The latter phone may be transcribed with ⟨ɜ⟩. The example word is from Lower Xumi. |

== See also ==
- Turned a
- Index of phonetics articles

== Notes ==
| Place → | Labial | | | | | Coronal | | | | | | | | | | Dorsal | | | | | Laryngeal | | | |
| Manner ↓ | Bilabial | | Labiodental | | Linguolabial | | Dental | | Alveolar | | Postalveolar | | Retroflex | | (Alveolo-)palatal | | Velar | | Uvular | | Pharyngeal/epiglottal | | Glottal | |
|---|---|---|---|---|---|---|---|---|---|---|---|---|---|---|---|---|---|---|---|---|---|---|---|---|
| Nasal | m̥ | m | ɱ̊ | ɱ | | n̼ | n̪̊ | n̪ | n̥ | n | n̠̊ | n̠ | ɳ̊ | ɳ | ɲ̊ | ɲ | ŋ̊ | ŋ | ɴ̥ | ɴ | | | | |
| Plosive | p | b | p̪ | b̪ | t̼ | d̼ | t̪ | d̪ | t | d | | | ʈ | ɖ | c | ɟ | k | ɡ | q | ɢ | ʡ | | ʔ | |
| Sibilant affricate | | | | | | | t̪s̪ | d̪z̪ | ts | dz | t̠ʃ | d̠ʒ | tʂ | dʐ | tɕ | dʑ | | | | | | | | |
| Non-sibilant affricate | pɸ | bβ | p̪f | b̪v | | | t̪θ | d̪ð | tɹ̝̊ | dɹ̝ | t̠ɹ̠̊˔ | d̠ɹ̠˔ | | | cç | ɟʝ | kx | ɡɣ | qχ | ɢʁ | ʡʜ | ʡʢ | ʔh | |
| Sibilant fricative | | | | | | | s̪ | z̪ | s | z | ʃ | ʒ | ʂ | ʐ | ɕ | ʑ | | | | | | | | |
| Non-sibilant fricative | ɸ | β | f | v | θ̼ | ð̼ | θ | ð | θ̠ | ð̠ | ɹ̠̊˔ | ɹ̠˔ | ɻ̊˔ | ɻ˔ | ç | ʝ | x | ɣ | χ | ʁ | ħ | ʕ | h | ɦ |
| Approximant | | β̞ | | ʋ | | | | ð̞ | | ɹ | | ɹ̠ | | ɻ | | j | | ɰ | | | | | | ˷ |
| Tap/flap | | ⱱ̟ | | ⱱ | | | | | ɾ̥ | ɾ | | | ɽ̊ | ɽ | | | | | | ɢ̆ | | ʡ̆ | | |
| Trill | ʙ̥ | ʙ | | | | | | | r̥ | r | | r̠ | ɽ̊r̥ | ɽr | | | | | ʀ̥ | ʀ | ʜ | ʢ | | |
| Lateral affricate | | | | | | | | | tɬ | dɮ | | | tꞎ | d𝼅 | c𝼆 | ɟʎ̝ | k𝼄 | ɡʟ̝ | | | | | | |
| Lateral fricative | | | | | | | ɬ̪ | | ɬ | ɮ | | | ꞎ | 𝼅 | 𝼆 | ʎ̝ | 𝼄 | ʟ̝ | | | | | | |
| Lateral approximant | | | | | | | | l̪ | l̥ | l | | l̠ | ɭ̊ | ɭ | ʎ̥ | ʎ | ʟ̥ | ʟ | | ʟ̠ | | | | |
| Lateral tap/flap | | | | | | | | | ɺ̥ | ɺ | | | 𝼈̊ | 𝼈 | | ʎ̆ | | ʟ̆ | | | | | | |

| | | BL | LD | D | A | PA | RF | P | V | U |
|---|---|---|---|---|---|---|---|---|---|---|
| Implosive | Voiced | ɓ | | | ɗ | | ᶑ | ʄ | ɠ | ʛ |
| Implosive | Voiceless | ɓ̥ | | | ɗ̥ | | ᶑ̊ | ʄ̊ | ɠ̊ | ʛ̥ |
| Ejective | Stop | pʼ | | | tʼ | | ʈʼ | cʼ | kʼ | qʼ |
| Ejective | Affricate | | p̪fʼ | tθʼ | tsʼ | tʃʼ | tʂʼ | tɕʼ | kxʼ | qχʼ |
| Ejective | Fricative | ɸʼ | fʼ | θʼ | sʼ | ʃʼ | ʂʼ | ɕʼ | xʼ | χʼ |
| Ejective | Lateral affricate | | | | tɬʼ | | | c𝼆ʼ | k𝼄ʼ | q𝼄ʼ |
| Ejective | Lateral fricative | | | | ɬʼ | | | | | |
| Click (top: velar; bottom: uvular) | Tenuis | kʘ qʘ | | kǀ qǀ | kǃ qǃ | | k𝼊 q𝼊 | kǂ qǂ | | |
| Click (top: velar; bottom: uvular) | Voiced | ɡʘ ɢʘ | | ɡǀ ɢǀ | ɡǃ ɢǃ | | ɡ𝼊 ɢ𝼊 | ɡǂ ɢǂ | | |
| Click (top: velar; bottom: uvular) | Nasal | ŋʘ ɴʘ | | ŋǀ ɴǀ | ŋǃ ɴǃ | | ŋ𝼊 ɴ𝼊 | ŋǂ ɴǂ | ʞ | |
| Click (top: velar; bottom: uvular) | Tenuis lateral | | | | kǁ qǁ | | | | | |
| Click (top: velar; bottom: uvular) | Voiced lateral | | | | ɡǁ ɢǁ | | | | | |
| Click (top: velar; bottom: uvular) | Nasal lateral | | | | ŋǁ ɴǁ | | | | | |
