= Voiced palatal plosive =

Consonantal sound represented by ⟨ɟ⟩ in IPA

ɟ
- IPA number: 108

Audio sample
- source · help

Encoding
- Entity (decimal): &#607;
- Unicode (hex): U+025F
- X-SAMPA: J\
- Braille: ⠔ (braille pattern dots-35) ⠚ (braille pattern dots-245)
Image

Voiced alveolo-palatal plosive

d̠ʲ

ɟ᫈

Audio sample
- source · help

A voiced palatal plosive or stop is a type of consonantal sound in some spoken languages. The symbol in the International Phonetic Alphabet that represents this sound is ⟨ɟ⟩, a barred dotless ⟨j⟩ that was initially created by turning the type for a lowercase letter ⟨f⟩ (i.e. ⟨f⟩).

If a distinction is necessary, a voiced alveolo-palatal plosive may be transcribed ⟨d̠ʲ⟩ (retracted and palatalized [d]) or ⟨ɟ᫈⟩ (advanced [ɟ]), depending on the linguistic analysis of that sound. There is also a para-IPA letter ⟨ȡ⟩ that is used primarily in Sinological phonetic notation.

[ɟ] is a less common sound worldwide than the voiced postalveolar affricate [d͡ʒ] because it is difficult to get the tongue to touch just the hard palate without also touching the back part of the alveolar ridge.

It is common for the symbol ⟨ɟ⟩ to be used to transcribe a palatalized voiced velar plosive [ɡʲ] or, as often in the Indo-Aryan languages, a postalveolar affricate [dʒ] – especially in phonemic notation. The latter may be appropriate when the place of articulation needs to be specified but the distinction between plosive and affricate is not contrastive, or simply for a cleaner transcription.

== Features ==
Sagittal section of a voiced palatal plosive

Features of a voiced palatal stop:

- Its manner of articulation is occlusive, which means it is produced by obstructing airflow in the vocal tract. Since the consonant is also oral, with no nasal outlet, it is a plosive.
- Its place of articulation is palatal, which means it is articulated with the middle or back part of the tongue raised to the hard palate.
  - Alveolo-palatal variant is articulated also with the blade of the tongue at or behind the alveolar ridge.
- Its phonation is voiced, which means the vocal cords vibrate during the articulation.
- It is an oral consonant, which means that air is not allowed to escape through the nose.
- It is a median consonant, which means it is produced by directing the airstream down the midline of the tongue, rather than to the sides.
- Its airstream mechanism is pulmonic, which means it is articulated by pushing air only with the intercostal muscles and abdominal muscles, as in most speech sounds.

== Occurrence ==
=== Palatal or alveolo-palatal ===
Language		Word	IPA	Meaning	Notes
Albanian		gjuha	[ˈɟuha]	'tongue'	Merged with [d͡ʒ] in Gheg Albanian and some speakers of Tosk Albanian.
Arabic	Some Northern Yemeni dialects	جمل	[ˈɟamal]	'camel'	Corresponds to [d͡ʒ ~ ʒ ~ ɡ ~ j] in other varieties. See Arabic phonology
Arabic	Rural and some urban Sudanese speakers	جمل	[ˈɟamal]	'camel'	Corresponds to [d͡ʒ ~ ʒ ~ ɡ ~ j] in other varieties. See Arabic phonology
Arabic	Upper Egypt	جمل	[ˈɟamal]	'camel'	Corresponds to [d͡ʒ ~ ʒ ~ ɡ ~ j] in other varieties. See Arabic phonology
Aramaic	some Urmian & Koine speakers	ܓܒ̣ܪܐ/gavrɑ	[ɟoːrɑ]	'husband' or 'man' lit. (male) person	Corresponds to /ɡ/ or /d͡ʒ/ in other dialects.
Aramaic	some Northern speakers	ܓܒ̣ܪܐ/gavrɑ	[ɟaʊrɑ]	'husband' or 'man' lit. (male) person	Corresponds to /ɡ/ or /d͡ʒ/ in other dialects.
Azerbaijani		گۆنش/günəş	[ɟyˈnæʃ]	'sun'	
Basque		anddere	[äɲɟe̞ɾe̞]	'doll'	
Breton	Gwenedeg	gwenn	[ɟɥɛ̃n]	'white'	Realization of /ɡ/ before front vowels.
Bulgarian		гьол	[ɟoɫ]	'swamp'	Palatalized [g] in Standard Bulgarian, may also be realized as [ɡj] by some speakers. See Bulgarian phonology
Catalan	Mallorcan	guix	[ˈɟiɕ]	'chalk'	Corresponds to /ɡ/ in other varieties. See Catalan phonology
Corsican		fighjulà	[viɟɟuˈla]	'to watch'	
Czech		dělit	[ˈɟ̟ɛlɪt]	'to divide'	Alveolo-palatal. See Czech phonology
Dinka		jir	[ɟir]	'blunt'	
Ega		[ɟé]		'become numerous'	
Friulian		gjat	[ɟat]	'cat'	
Ganda		jjajja	[ɟːaɟːa]	'grandfather'	
Hausa		gyara	[ɟːarːa]	'repair'	
Hungarian		gyám	[ɟäːm]	'guardian'	See Hungarian phonology
Irish		Gaeilge	[ˈɡeːlʲɟə]	'Irish language'	See Irish phonology
Latvian		ģimene	[ˈɟime̞ne̞]	'family'	See Latvian phonology
Livonian		kīņḑõl	[ˈkiːɲɟəl]	'candle'	
Macedonian		раѓање	[ˈraɟaɲɛ]	'birth'	See Macedonian phonology
Malay	Kelantan-Pattani	تراجڠ/terajang	[tə.ɣa.ɟɛ̃ː]	'kick'	See Kelantan-Pattani Malay
Munji		ڱب	[ɟɪb]	'lost'	
Norwegian	Central	fadder	[fɑɟːeɾ]	'godparent'	See Norwegian phonology
Norwegian	Northern	fadder	[fɑɟːeɾ]	'godparent'	See Norwegian phonology
Occitan	Auvergnat	diguèt	[ɟiˈɡɛ]	'said' (3rd pers. sing.)	See Occitan phonology
Occitan	Limousin	dissèt	[ɟiˈʃɛ]	'said' (3rd pers. sing.)	See Occitan phonology
Pannonian Rusyn		Дюрдьов	[ˈɟurɟɔw]	'Đurđevo'	Only occurs in loanwords; Old Slovak ď becomes дз in native inherits.
Pitjantjatjara		Pitjantjatjara	[ˈpɪɟanɟaɟaɾa]		See Pitjantjatjara dialect
Sicilian		travagghju	[ʈɽɑ̝ˈväɟ.ɟʊ̠] or [ʈ͡ʂɑ̝ˈväɟ.ɟʊ̠]	'job, task'	
Slovak		ďaleký	[ˈɟ̟äɫe̞kiː]	'far'	Alveolo-palatal. See Slovak phonology
Spanish		ya	[ɟa]	'already'	Realization of /ʝ/, may also be realized as [ɟʝ] in onset or after nasal consonant. See Spanish phonology
Spanish		malla	[ˈmaɟ̆a]	'net'	Intervocalic allophonic realization of the above.
Turkish		güneş	[ɟyˈne̞ʃ]	'sun'	See Turkish phonology
Vietnamese	North-central dialect	da	[ɟa˧]	'skin'	See Vietnamese phonology
Wu	Taizhou dialect	共/gion^{6}	[ɟyoŋ]	'together'	

=== Post-palatal ===
Voiced post-palatal or pre-velar plosive

ɟ᫢

ɡ᫈

There is also a voiced post-palatal or pre-velar plosive in some languages, which is articulated slightly more back than the place of articulation of the prototypical palatal consonant but not as back as the prototypical velar consonant. The IPA does not have a separate symbol for that sound, which can be transcribed as ⟨ɟ̠⟩, ⟨ɟ᫢⟩ (both symbols denote a retracted ⟨ɟ⟩), ⟨ɡ̟⟩, ⟨ɡ᫈⟩ (both symbols denote an advanced ⟨ɡ⟩), or ⟨ɡʲ⟩ (palatalized ⟨ɡ⟩, though this is more ambiguous than the others; see below).

Language		Word	IPA	Meaning	Notes
Catalan		guix	[ˈɡ̟iɕ]	'chalk'	Allophone of /ɡ/ before front vowels when not preceded by a vowel. See Catalan phonology
English		geese	[ɡ̟iːs]	'geese'	Allophone of /ɡ/ before front vowels and /j/. See English phonology
Greek		μετάγγιση/metággisi	[me̞ˈtɐŋ̟ɟ̠is̠i]	'transfusion'	Post-palatal. See Modern Greek phonology
Italian	Standard	ghianda	[ˈɡ̟jän̪ːd̪ä]	'acorn'	Post-palatal; allophone of /ɡ/ before /i, e, ɛ, j/. See Italian phonology
Japanese		銀/gin	[ɡʲiɴ]	'silver'	
Portuguese		amiguinho	[ɐmiˈɡ̟ĩɲu]	'little buddy'	Allophone of /ɡ/ before front vowels. See Portuguese phonology
Romanian		ghimpe	[ˈɡ̟impe̞]	'thorn'	Both an allophone of /ɡ/ before /i, e, j/ and the phonetic realization of /ɡʲ/. See Romanian phonology
Russian	Standard	герб/gerb	[ɡ̟e̞rp]	'coat of arms'	Typically transcribed in IPA with ⟨ɡʲ⟩. See Russian phonology
Spanish		guía	[ˈɡ̟i.ä]	'guidebook'	Allophone of /ɡ/ before front vowels when not preceded by a vowel. See Spanish phonology
Yanyuwa		[ɡ̠uɡ̟uɭu]		'sacred'	Contrasts plain and prenasalized versions.

== See also ==
- Index of phonetics articles

== Notes ==
Place →	Labial					Coronal										Dorsal					Laryngeal			
Manner ↓	Bilabial		Labiodental		Linguolabial		Dental		Alveolar		Postalveolar		Retroflex		(Alveolo-)palatal		Velar		Uvular		Pharyngeal/epiglottal		Glottal	
Nasal	m̥	m	ɱ̊	ɱ		n̼	n̪̊	n̪	n̥	n	n̠̊	n̠	ɳ̊	ɳ	ɲ̊	ɲ	ŋ̊	ŋ	ɴ̥	ɴ				
Plosive	p	b	p̪	b̪	t̼	d̼	t̪	d̪	t	d			ʈ	ɖ	c	ɟ	k	ɡ	q	ɢ	ʡ		ʔ	
Sibilant affricate							t̪s̪	d̪z̪	ts	dz	t̠ʃ	d̠ʒ	tʂ	dʐ	tɕ	dʑ								
Non-sibilant affricate	pɸ	bβ	p̪f	b̪v			t̪θ	d̪ð	tɹ̝̊	dɹ̝	t̠ɹ̠̊˔	d̠ɹ̠˔			cç	ɟʝ	kx	ɡɣ	qχ	ɢʁ	ʡʜ	ʡʢ	ʔh	
Sibilant fricative							s̪	z̪	s	z	ʃ	ʒ	ʂ	ʐ	ɕ	ʑ								
Non-sibilant fricative	ɸ	β	f	v	θ̼	ð̼	θ	ð	θ̠	ð̠	ɹ̠̊˔	ɹ̠˔	ɻ̊˔	ɻ˔	ç	ʝ	x	ɣ	χ	ʁ	ħ	ʕ	h	ɦ
Approximant		β̞		ʋ				ð̞		ɹ		ɹ̠		ɻ		j		ɰ						˷
Tap/flap		ⱱ̟		ⱱ					ɾ̥	ɾ			ɽ̊	ɽ						ɢ̆		ʡ̆		
Trill	ʙ̥	ʙ							r̥	r		r̠	ɽ̊r̥	ɽr					ʀ̥	ʀ	ʜ	ʢ		
Lateral affricate									tɬ	dɮ			tꞎ	d𝼅	c𝼆	ɟʎ̝	k𝼄	ɡʟ̝						
Lateral fricative							ɬ̪		ɬ	ɮ			ꞎ	𝼅	𝼆	ʎ̝	𝼄	ʟ̝						
Lateral approximant								l̪	l̥	l		l̠	ɭ̊	ɭ	ʎ̥	ʎ	ʟ̥	ʟ		ʟ̠				
Lateral tap/flap									ɺ̥	ɺ			𝼈̊	𝼈		ʎ̆		ʟ̆						

		BL	LD	D	A	PA	RF	P	V	U
Implosive	Voiced	ɓ			ɗ		ᶑ	ʄ	ɠ	ʛ
Implosive	Voiceless	ɓ̥			ɗ̥		ᶑ̊	ʄ̊	ɠ̊	ʛ̥
Ejective	Stop	pʼ			tʼ		ʈʼ	cʼ	kʼ	qʼ
Ejective	Affricate		p̪fʼ	tθʼ	tsʼ	tʃʼ	tʂʼ	tɕʼ	kxʼ	qχʼ
Ejective	Fricative	ɸʼ	fʼ	θʼ	sʼ	ʃʼ	ʂʼ	ɕʼ	xʼ	χʼ
Ejective	Lateral affricate				tɬʼ			c𝼆ʼ	k𝼄ʼ	q𝼄ʼ
Ejective	Lateral fricative				ɬʼ					
Click (top: velar; bottom: uvular)	Tenuis	kʘ qʘ		kǀ qǀ	kǃ qǃ		k𝼊 q𝼊	kǂ qǂ		
Click (top: velar; bottom: uvular)	Voiced	ɡʘ ɢʘ		ɡǀ ɢǀ	ɡǃ ɢǃ		ɡ𝼊 ɢ𝼊	ɡǂ ɢǂ		
Click (top: velar; bottom: uvular)	Nasal	ŋʘ ɴʘ		ŋǀ ɴǀ	ŋǃ ɴǃ		ŋ𝼊 ɴ𝼊	ŋǂ ɴǂ	ʞ	
Click (top: velar; bottom: uvular)	Tenuis lateral				kǁ qǁ					
Click (top: velar; bottom: uvular)	Voiced lateral				ɡǁ ɢǁ					
Click (top: velar; bottom: uvular)	Nasal lateral				ŋǁ ɴǁ					
