= Voiceless palatal plosive =

Consonantal sound represented by ⟨c⟩ in IPA

c
- IPA number: 107

Audio sample
- source · help

Encoding
- Entity (decimal): &#99;
- Unicode (hex): U+0063
- X-SAMPA: c
- Braille: ⠉ (braille pattern dots-14)
Image

Voiceless alveolo-palatal plosive

t̠ʲ

c̟

Audio sample
- source · help

A voiceless palatal plosive or stop is a type of consonantal sound used in some spoken languages. The symbol in the International Phonetic Alphabet that represents this sound is ⟨c⟩.

If distinction is necessary, a voiceless alveolo-palatal plosive may be transcribed ⟨t̠ʲ⟩ (retracted and palatalized [t]) or ⟨c̟⟩ (advanced [c]), depending on the linguistic analysis of that sound. There is also a para-IPA letter ⟨ȶ⟩ that is used primarily in Sinological phonetic notation.

It is common for the symbol ⟨c⟩ to be used to transcribe a palatalized voiceless velar plosive [kʲ] or, as often in the Indo-Aryan languages, a postalveolar affricate [tʃ] – especially in phonemic notation. The latter may be appropriate when the place of articulation needs to be specified but the distinction between plosive and affricate is not contrastive, or simply for a cleaner transcription.

== Features ==
Sagittal section of a voiceless palatal plosive

Features of a voiceless palatal stop:

- Its manner of articulation is occlusive, which means it is produced by obstructing airflow in the vocal tract. Since the consonant is also oral, with no nasal outlet, it is a plosive.
- Its place of articulation is palatal, which means it is articulated with the middle or back part of the tongue raised to the hard palate.
  - The otherwise identical post-palatal variant is articulated slightly behind the hard palate, making it sound closer to the velar [k].
  - Alveolo-palatal variant is articulated also with the blade of the tongue at or behind the alveolar ridge.
- Its phonation is voiceless, which means it is produced without vibrations of the vocal cords. In some languages the vocal cords are actively separated, so it is always voiceless; in others the cords are lax, so that it may take on the voicing of adjacent sounds.
- It is an oral consonant, which means that air is not allowed to escape through the nose.
- It is a median consonant, which means it is produced by directing the airstream down the midline of the tongue, rather than to the sides.
- Its airstream mechanism is pulmonic, which means it is articulated by pushing air only with the intercostal muscles and abdominal muscles, as in most speech sounds.

== Occurrence ==
=== Palatal or alveolo-palatal ===
Language		Word	IPA	Meaning	Notes
Albanian		shqip	[ʃcip]	'Albanian'	Merged with [t͡ʃ] in Gheg Albanian and some speakers of Tosk Albanian.
Asturian	Western dialects	muyyer	[muˈceɾ]	'woman'	Alternate evolution of -lj-, -c'l-, pl-, cl- and fl- in the Brañas Vaqueiras area of Western Asturias. May be also realized as [c͡ç] or [ɟ͡ʝ]
Amuzgo	Xochistlahuaca variety	tyaáⁿ	[cã́]	'clumsy; a clumsy person'	
Assyrian	Urmi dialect	ܟܘܿܡܵܐ	[cuma]	'black'	
Azerbaijani		کئچی / keçi	[ceˈt͡ʃi]	'goat'	Can realize as [t͡ʃ̟] in Tabriz accent
Basque		ttantta	[cäɲcä]	'droplet'	
Blackfoot		ᖿᑉᔭ / kʸāyo	[ˈcaːjo]	'bear'	Mostly it is pronounced as /kʲ/.
Breton	Gwenedeg	kenn	[cɛ̃n]	'dandruff'	Realization of /k/ before front vowels.
Bulgarian	Banat dialect	kaćétu (каќету or какьету)	[kacetu]	'as'	See Bulgarian phonology
Catalan	Mallorcan	qui	[ˈci]	'who'	Alveolo-palatal or palatal. Corresponds to /k/ in other varieties. See Catalan phonology
Corsican		chjodu	[ˈcoːdu]	'nail'	Also present in the Gallurese dialect
Croatian	Littoral dialect	već	[vec]	'already'	
Czech		čeština	[ˈt͡ʃɛʃc̟ɪna]	'Czech' (language)	Alveolo-palatal or alveolar. See Czech phonology
Damin		dunji-kan	[t̺un̺t̠ʲi kan̺]	'go'	
Dawsahak		[cɛːˈnɐ]		'small'	
Dinka		car	[car]	'black'	
Ega		[cá]		'understand'	
French		sac	[s̪ac]	'bag'	Ranges from alveolar to palatal. See French phonology
Friulian		cjase	[caze]	'house'	
Ganda		caayi	[caːji]	'tea'	
Gweno		[ca]		'to come'	
Hakka	Meixian	飛機 / fi^{1} gi^{1}	[fi˦ ci˦]	'plane'	Allophone of /k/ before /i/.
Hausa		kyauta	[caːuta]	'gift'	
Hokkien	Taiwanese	機車 / ki-tshia	[ciː˧ t͡ɕʰia˥]	'motorcycle'	
Hungarian		kutya	[ˈkuc̟ᶝɒ]	'dog'	Alveolo-palatal. See Hungarian phonology
Icelandic		Eldgjá	[ˈɛlˑt̪c̟ɑu̯]	'Eldgjá'	Alveolo-palatal. See Icelandic phonology
Irish		ceist	[cɛʃtʲ]	'question'	Alveolo-palatal or palatal. See Irish phonology
Khasi		boit	[bɔc]	'dwarf'	
Khmer		ចាប / chab	[caːp]	'bird'	Contrasts aspirated and unaspirated forms.
Kinyarwanda		ikintu	[iciːnɦuʰ]	'thing'	
Kurdish	Northern	kîso	[cʰiːsoː]	'tortoise'	Allophone of /kʰ/ before /ɨ/, /ɛ/, /iː/, and /eː/. See Kurdish phonology
Kurdish	Central	کیسەڵ	[cʰiːsæɫ]	'tortoise'	Allophone of /kʰ/ before /ɨ/, /ɛ/, /iː/, and /eː/. See Kurdish phonology
Kurdish	Southern	کیسەڵ	[cʰiːsaɫ]	'tortoise'	Allophone of /kʰ/ before /ɨ/, /ɛ/, /iː/, and /eː/. See Kurdish phonology
Latvian		ķirbis	[ˈcirbis]	'pumpkin'	See Latvian phonology
Livonian	Courland	kuoț	[ˈkuoc]	'bag'	
Livonian	Salaca	ķez	[cez]	'hand'	
Low German	Plautdietsch	kjoakj	[coac]	'church'	Corresponds to [kʲ] in all other dialects.
Macedonian		шеќер	[ˈʃɛc^{ç}ɛr]	'sugar'	Prescribed realisation of the /c/ phoneme, varies greatly across dialects. See Macedonian phonology
Malay	Kelantan-Pattani	cita	[ci.tɔʔ]	'feeling'	Palatal, allophone of /tʃ/. See Malay phonology
Malay	Indonesian	cari	[cari]	'to find'	Palatal, allophone of /tʃ/. See Malay phonology
Marathi		चिंच / ciṁca	[c̟ɪ̃nt͡sʌ̝]	'tamarind'	Allophone of /t͡s/, /t͡ʃ/ or /t͡ɕ/
Norwegian	Central dialects	fett	[fɛcː]	'fat'	See Norwegian phonology
Norwegian	Northern dialects	fett	[fɛcː]	'fat'	See Norwegian phonology
Occitan	Limousin	tireta	[ciˈʀetɒ]	'drawer'	
Occitan	Auvergnat	tirador	[ciʀaˈdu]	'drawer'	
Occitan	Western Gascon	chifra	[ˈcifrə]	'digit'	Corresponds to [tʃ] and sometimes [dʒ] in eastern dialects
Romanian		Chișinău	[cᶜ̧iʃiˈnɜu̯]	'Chișinău'	Allophone of /k/ before /i/ and /e/. See Romanian phonology. Also in some northern dialects
Romansh	Sursilvan	notg	[nɔc]	'night'	
Romansh	Sutsilvan	tgàn	[caŋ]	'dog'	
Romansh	Surmiran	vatgas	[ˈvɑcɐs]	'cows'	
Romansh	Puter	zücher	[ˈtsycər]	'sugar'	
Romansh	Vallader	müs-chel	[ˈmyʃcəl]	'moss'	
Scottish Gaelic		maide	[ˈmãtʲə]	'stick'	Alveolo-palatal or alveolar. Affricated in some positions, with affrication stronger in certain dialects.
Slovak		ťava	[ˈcava]	'camel'	Laminal alveolo-palatal. Often africated. See Slovak phonology
Turkish		köy	[cʰø̞j̊ʷ]	'village'	See Turkish phonology
Vietnamese	Central and Southern	Ba Chẽ	[bɐː˧ c̟ɛˑ˧ˀ˥]	'Ba Chẽ'	May be slightly affricated [tᶝ]. See Vietnamese phonology
West Frisian		tjems	[cɛms]	'strainer'	See West Frisian phonology
Western Desert		kutju	[kucu]	'one'	

=== Post-palatal ===
Voiceless post-palatal or pre-velar plosive

c̠

k̟

There is also a voiceless post-palatal or pre-velar plosive in some languages, which is articulated slightly more back compared with the place of articulation of the prototypical palatal consonant, though not as back as the prototypical velar consonant. The International Phonetic Alphabet does not have a separate symbol for that sound, though it can be transcribed as ⟨c̠⟩ (retracted ⟨c⟩), ⟨k̟⟩ (advanced ⟨k⟩), or ⟨kʲ⟩ (palatalized ⟨k⟩, though this is more ambiguous than the others; see below).

Language		Word	IPA	Meaning	Notes
Belarusian		кіслы	[ˈk̟is̪ɫ̪ɨ]	'acidic'	Typically transcribed in IPA with ⟨kʲ⟩. See Belarusian phonology
Catalan		qui	[ˈk̟i]	'who'	Allophone of /k/ before front vowels. See Catalan phonology
Danish	Standard	gidsel	[ˈk̟isəl]	'hostage'	Allophone of /ɡ/ before front vowels. See Danish phonology
English		keen	[k̟ʰiːn]	'keen'	Allophone of /k/ before front vowels and /j/. See English phonology
English		back	[bæc̠]	back	Mainstream Irish English realisation of /k/ after front vowels.
German	Standard	Kind	[k̟ʰɪnt]	'child'	Allophone of /k/ before and after front vowels. See Standard German phonology
Greek		Μακεδνός	[mɐc̠e̞ˈðno̞s̠]	'Makedon'	See Modern Greek phonology
Italian	Standard	chi	[k̟i]	'who'	Allophone of /k/ before /i, e, ɛ, j/. See Italian phonology
Japanese		九 / kyū	[k̟ÿː]	'nine'	Typically transcribed in IPA with ⟨kʲ⟩, allophone of /kj/. See Japanese phonology
Polish		kiedy	[ˈk̟ɛdɨ]	'when'	See Polish phonology
Portuguese		qui	[k̟i]	'Chi'	Allophone of /k/ before front vowels. See Portuguese phonology
Romanian		ochi	[o̞k̟]	'eye'	Typically transcribed in IPA with ⟨kʲ⟩. See Romanian phonology
Russian	Standard	кит / kit	[k̟it̪]	'whale'	Typically transcribed in IPA with ⟨kʲ⟩. See Russian phonology
Scottish Gaelic		còig	[kʰoːʲk̟]	'five (5)'	Typically transcribed in IPA with ⟨kʲ⟩. Contrasts aspirated and unaspirated forms.
Spanish		kilo	[ˈk̟ilo̞]	'kilo(gram)'	Allophone of /k/ before front vowels. See Spanish phonology
Tidore		yaci	[jaci]	'to rip'	
Ukrainian		кінчик/kinchyk	[ˈk̟inʲt͡ʃɪk]	'tip'	Can also be transcribed in IPA with ⟨kʲ⟩, but is an allophone of /k/ before front vowels. See Ukrainian phonology
Vietnamese		cách	[kak̟]	'to cut, to harvest'	Final allophone of /c/. See Vietnamese phonology

== See also ==
- Index of phonetics articles

== Notes ==
Place →	Labial					Coronal										Dorsal					Laryngeal			
Manner ↓	Bilabial		Labiodental		Linguolabial		Dental		Alveolar		Postalveolar		Retroflex		(Alveolo-)palatal		Velar		Uvular		Pharyngeal/epiglottal		Glottal	
Nasal	m̥	m	ɱ̊	ɱ		n̼	n̪̊	n̪	n̥	n	n̠̊	n̠	ɳ̊	ɳ	ɲ̊	ɲ	ŋ̊	ŋ	ɴ̥	ɴ				
Plosive	p	b	p̪	b̪	t̼	d̼	t̪	d̪	t	d			ʈ	ɖ	c	ɟ	k	ɡ	q	ɢ	ʡ		ʔ	
Sibilant affricate							t̪s̪	d̪z̪	ts	dz	t̠ʃ	d̠ʒ	tʂ	dʐ	tɕ	dʑ								
Non-sibilant affricate	pɸ	bβ	p̪f	b̪v			t̪θ	d̪ð	tɹ̝̊	dɹ̝	t̠ɹ̠̊˔	d̠ɹ̠˔			cç	ɟʝ	kx	ɡɣ	qχ	ɢʁ	ʡʜ	ʡʢ	ʔh	
Sibilant fricative							s̪	z̪	s	z	ʃ	ʒ	ʂ	ʐ	ɕ	ʑ								
Non-sibilant fricative	ɸ	β	f	v	θ̼	ð̼	θ	ð	θ̠	ð̠	ɹ̠̊˔	ɹ̠˔	ɻ̊˔	ɻ˔	ç	ʝ	x	ɣ	χ	ʁ	ħ	ʕ	h	ɦ
Approximant		β̞		ʋ				ð̞		ɹ		ɹ̠		ɻ		j		ɰ						˷
Tap/flap		ⱱ̟		ⱱ					ɾ̥	ɾ			ɽ̊	ɽ						ɢ̆		ʡ̆		
Trill	ʙ̥	ʙ							r̥	r		r̠	ɽ̊r̥	ɽr					ʀ̥	ʀ	ʜ	ʢ		
Lateral affricate									tɬ	dɮ			tꞎ	d𝼅	c𝼆	ɟʎ̝	k𝼄	ɡʟ̝						
Lateral fricative							ɬ̪		ɬ	ɮ			ꞎ	𝼅	𝼆	ʎ̝	𝼄	ʟ̝						
Lateral approximant								l̪	l̥	l		l̠	ɭ̊	ɭ	ʎ̥	ʎ	ʟ̥	ʟ		ʟ̠				
Lateral tap/flap									ɺ̥	ɺ			𝼈̊	𝼈		ʎ̆		ʟ̆						

		BL	LD	D	A	PA	RF	P	V	U
Implosive	Voiced	ɓ			ɗ		ᶑ	ʄ	ɠ	ʛ
Implosive	Voiceless	ɓ̥			ɗ̥		ᶑ̊	ʄ̊	ɠ̊	ʛ̥
Ejective	Stop	pʼ			tʼ		ʈʼ	cʼ	kʼ	qʼ
Ejective	Affricate		p̪fʼ	tθʼ	tsʼ	tʃʼ	tʂʼ	tɕʼ	kxʼ	qχʼ
Ejective	Fricative	ɸʼ	fʼ	θʼ	sʼ	ʃʼ	ʂʼ	ɕʼ	xʼ	χʼ
Ejective	Lateral affricate				tɬʼ			c𝼆ʼ	k𝼄ʼ	q𝼄ʼ
Ejective	Lateral fricative				ɬʼ					
Click (top: velar; bottom: uvular)	Tenuis	kʘ qʘ		kǀ qǀ	kǃ qǃ		k𝼊 q𝼊	kǂ qǂ		
Click (top: velar; bottom: uvular)	Voiced	ɡʘ ɢʘ		ɡǀ ɢǀ	ɡǃ ɢǃ		ɡ𝼊 ɢ𝼊	ɡǂ ɢǂ		
Click (top: velar; bottom: uvular)	Nasal	ŋʘ ɴʘ		ŋǀ ɴǀ	ŋǃ ɴǃ		ŋ𝼊 ɴ𝼊	ŋǂ ɴǂ	ʞ	
Click (top: velar; bottom: uvular)	Tenuis lateral				kǁ qǁ					
Click (top: velar; bottom: uvular)	Voiced lateral				ɡǁ ɢǁ					
Click (top: velar; bottom: uvular)	Nasal lateral				ŋǁ ɴǁ					
