= Voiced alveolar affricate =

Consonantal sound

Voiced alveolar sibilant affricate

dz

ʣ
- IPA number: 104 133

Audio sample
- source · help

Encoding
- Entity (decimal): &#675;
- Unicode (hex): U+02A3
- X-SAMPA: dz
Image

A voiced alveolar affricate is a type of affricate consonant pronounced with the tip or blade of the tongue against the alveolar ridge (gum line) just behind the teeth. There are several types of median affricates with significant perceptual differences:

- A voiced alveolar sibilant affricate [d͡z] is the most common type, similar to the ds in English lads.
- A voiced alveolar non-sibilant affricate [dð̠] – or [dð͇], using the alveolar diacritic from the Extended IPA, – is found, for example, in some dialects of English and Italian.
- A voiced retracted alveolar sibilant affricate [d͡z̺] or [d̠͡z̠].

== Voiced alveolar sibilant affricate ==
A voiced alveolar sibilant affricate is a type of consonantal sound used in some spoken languages. The sound is transcribed in the International Phonetic Alphabet with ⟨d͡z⟩ or ⟨d͜z⟩. The tie bar may be omitted, yielding ⟨dz⟩. There is also a ligature ⟨ʣ⟩, which has been retired by the International Phonetic Association but is still used.

=== Features ===
Features of a voiced alveolar sibilant affricate:

- Its manner of articulation is sibilant affricate, which means it is produced by first stopping the air flow entirely, then directing it with the tongue to the sharp edge of the teeth, causing high-frequency turbulence.
- The stop component of this affricate is laminal alveolar, which means it is articulated with the blade of the tongue at the alveolar ridge. For simplicity, this affricate is usually called after the sibilant fricative component.
- There are at least three specific variants of the fricative component:
  - Dentalized laminal alveolar (commonly called "dental"), which means it is articulated with the tongue blade very close to the upper front teeth, with the tongue tip resting behind lower front teeth. The hissing effect in this variety of [z] is very strong.
  - Non-retracted alveolar, which means it is articulated with either the tip or the blade of the tongue at the alveolar ridge, termed respectively apical and laminal.
  - Retracted alveolar, which means it is articulated with either the tip or the blade of the tongue slightly behind the alveolar ridge, termed respectively apical and laminal. Acoustically, it is close to [ʒ] or laminal [ʐ].
- Its phonation is voiced, which means the vocal cords vibrate during the articulation.
- It is a median consonant, which means it is produced by directing the airstream down the midline of the tongue, rather than to the sides.
- Its airstream mechanism is pulmonic, which means it is articulated by pushing air only with the intercostal muscles and abdominal muscles, as in most speech sounds.

=== Occurrence ===
The following sections are named after the fricative component.

==== Dentalized laminal alveolar ====
Voiced dental sibilant affricate

d̪z̪

d̻z̪

Audio sample
- source · help

Language		Word	IPA	Meaning	Notes
Armenian	Eastern	ձուկ/dzuk	[d̻͡z̪uk]	'fish'	
Belarusian		пэндзаль/pendzal	[ˈpɛn̪d̻͡z̪alʲ]	'paintbrush'	Contrasts with palatalized form. See Belarusian phonology
Bulgarian		скръндза	[skrɤnd̻͡z̪а]	'skinflint', 'miser'	See Bulgarian phonology
Hungarian		bodza	[ˈbod̻͡z̪ːɒ]	'elderberry'	See Hungarian phonology
Japanese		雀/suzume	[s̪ɯd̻͡z̪ɯme̞]	'sparrow'	See Japanese phonology
Kashubian		dze	[d͡ze]	'where'	
Latvian		drudzis	[ˈd̪rud̻͡z̪is̪]	'fever'	See Latvian phonology
Macedonian		ѕвезда/dzvezda	[ˈd̻͡z̪ve̞z̪d̪ä]	'star'	See Macedonian phonology
Montenegrin		dzindzula	[ˈd̻͡z̪inˈd̻͡z̪ulä]	'jujube'	See Montenegrin phonology
Pashto		ځوان	[d͡zwɑn]	'youth' 'young'	See Pashto phonology
Polish		dzwon	[d̻͡z̪vɔn̪]	'bell'	See Polish phonology
Russian		плацдарм/placdarm	[pɫ̪ɐd̻͡z̪ˈd̪är̠m]	'bridgehead'	Allophone of /t͡s/ before voiced consonants. See Russian phonology
Serbo-Croatian		otac bi	[ǒ̞t̪äd̻͡z̪ bi]	'father would'	Allophone of /t͡s/ before voiced consonants. See Serbo-Croatian phonology
Slovak		medzi	[med͡zi]	'between'	See Slovak phonology
Slovene		brivec brije	[ˈbɾíːʋə̀d̻͡z̪ bɾíjɛ̀]	'barber shaves'	Allophone of /t͡s/ before voiced consonants in native words. As a phoneme present only in loanwords. See Slovene phonology
Tyap		zat	[d͡zad]	'buffalo'	
Ukrainian		дзвін dzvin	[d̻͡z̪ʋin̪]	'bell'	Contrasts with palatalized form. See Ukrainian phonology
Upper Sorbian					Allophone of /t͡s/ before voiced consonants.

==== Alveolar ====
Language		Word	IPA	Meaning	Notes
Arabic	Najdi	قـليب/dzilīb	[d͡zəliːb]	'well'	Corresponds to /q/, /ɡ/, or /dʒ/ in other dialects.
Czech		Afgánec byl	[ˈavɡaːnɛd͡z bɪl]	'an Afghan was'	Allophone of /t͡s/ before voiced consonants. See Czech phonology
English	Broad Cockney	day	[ˈd͡zæˑɪ̯]	'day'	Possible word-initial, intervocalic and word-final allophone of /d/. See English phonology
English	Received Pronunciation	day	[ˈd͡zeˑɪ̯]	'day'	Possible word-initial, intervocalic and word-final allophone of /d/. See English phonology
English	New York	day	[ˈd͡zeˑɪ̯]	'day'	Possible syllable-initial and sometimes also utterance-final allophone of /d/. See English phonology
English	Scouse	day	[ˈd͡zeˑɪ̯]	'day'	Possible syllable-initial and word-final allophone of /d/. See English phonology
French	Quebec	du	[d͡zy]	'of the'	Allophone of /d/ before /i, y, j/.
Georgian		ძვალი/dzvali	[d͡zvɑli]	'bone'	
Hebrew	Some speakers	מצוה/mitzvah	[mid͡zˈvä]	'commandment'	Allophone of /t͡s/ before voiced consonant. See Modern Hebrew phonology
Luxembourgish		spadséieren	[ʃpɑˈd͡zɜ̝ɪ̯əʀən]	'to go for a walk'	Marginal phoneme that occurs only in a few words. See Luxembourgish phonology
Marathi		जोर/dzor	[d͡zor]	'force'	Contrasts aspirated and unaspirated versions. The unaspirated is represented by ज, which also represents [d͡ʒ]. The aspirated sound is represented by झ, which also represents [d͡ʒʱ]. There is no marked difference for either one.
Ollari		jōnel	[d͡zoːnel]	'maize'	
Nepali		आज/ādza	[äd͡zʌ]	'today'	Contrasts aspirated and unaspirated versions. The unaspirated is represented by /ज/. The aspirated sound is represented by /झ/. See Nepali phonology
Naiki		jūrol	[d͡zuːɾol]	'cricket'	
Portuguese	European	desafio	[d͡zɐˈfi.u]	'challenge'	Allophone of /d/ before /i, ĩ/, or assimilation due to the deletion of /i ~ ɨ ~ e/. Increasingly used in Brazil.
Portuguese	Brazilian	aprendizado	[apɾẽ̞ˈd͡zadu]	'learning'	Allophone of /d/ before /i, ĩ/, or assimilation due to the deletion of /i ~ ɨ ~ e/. Increasingly used in Brazil.
Portuguese	Many speakers	mezzosoprano	[me̞d͡zo̞so̞ˈpɾɐ̃nu]	'mezzo-soprano'	Marginal sound. Some might instead use spelling pronunciations. See Portuguese phonology
Romanian	Moldavian dialects	zic	[d͡zɨk]	'say'	Corresponds to [z] in standard Romanian. See Romanian phonology
Telugu		ౙత/dzata	[d͡zɐt̪ɐ]	'pair, set'	
Teochew	Swatow	日本/jitpun	[d͡zit̚˨˩.pʊn˥˧]	'Japan'	
Toda		[yd͡z]		'five'	

==== Retracted alveolar ====
Voiced retracted alveolar sibilant affricate

d̻͡z̺

Language		Word	IPA	Meaning	Notes
Catalan	Most dialects	dotze	[ˈd̪o(d)d̻͡z̺ə]	'twelve'	The fricative component is apical. It merges with /d͡ʒ/ [d͡ʑ] (or [d͡ːʑ]) in some dialects. See Catalan phonology
Occitan	Gascon	messatge	[məˈs̠ːa̠d̠͡z̠ə]	'message'	Laminal in other dialects. Varies with [dʒ] in some words.
Occitan	Languedocien	messatge	[məˈs̠ːa̠d̠͡z̠ə]	'message'	Laminal in other dialects. Varies with [dʒ] in some words.
Piedmontese		arvëdse	[ɑrˈvəd̠͡z̠e]	'goodbye'	
Sardinian	Central dialects	pranzu	[ˈpränd̠͡z̠u]	'lunch'	

==== Variable ====
Language	Word	IPA	Meaning	Notes
Greek	τζάκι	[ˈd͡zɐc̠i]	'fireplace'	Varies between retracted and non-retracted, depending on the environment. Phonemically, it is a stop–fricative sequence. See Modern Greek phonology
Italian	zero	[ˈd͡zɛːro]	'zero'	The fricative component varies between dentalized laminal and non-retracted apical. In the latter case, the stop component is laminal denti-alveolar. See Italian phonology
Montenegrin	dzavala	[ˈd̻͡z̪avalä]	'haystack'	Varies between dentalized laminal and sibilant affricate. See Montenegrin phonology
West Frisian	skodzje	[ˈs̠kɔd͡zjə]	'shake'	Laminal; varies between retracted and non-retracted. Phonemically, it is a stop–fricative sequence. The example word also illustrates [s̠]. See West Frisian phonology

== Voiced alveolar non-sibilant affricate ==
Voiced alveolar non-sibilant affricate

dɹ̝

=== Features ===
- Its manner of articulation is affricate, which means it is produced by first stopping the airflow entirely, then allowing air flow through a constricted channel at the place of articulation, causing turbulence.
- Its place of articulation is alveolar, which means it is articulated with either the tip or the blade of the tongue at the alveolar ridge, termed respectively apical and laminal.
- Its phonation is voiced, which means the vocal cords vibrate during the articulation.
- It is an oral consonant, which means that air is not allowed to escape through the nose.
- It is a median consonant, which means it is produced by directing the airstream down the midline of the tongue, rather than to the sides.
- Its airstream mechanism is pulmonic, which means it is articulated by pushing air only with the intercostal muscles and abdominal muscles, as in most speech sounds.

=== Occurrence ===
Language		Word	IPA	Meaning	Notes
Dutch	Orsmaal-Gussenhoven dialect	schapdeur	[sxabˈdœɪdɹ̝]	'cabinet door'	Apical; a possible realization of word-final, non-pre-pausal /r/.
English	General American	dream	[d͡ɹ̝ʷɪi̯m]	'dream'	Phonetic realization of the stressed, syllable-initial sequence /dr/; more commonly postalveolar [d̠͡ɹ̠˔]. See English phonology
English	Received Pronunciation	dream	[d͡ɹ̝ʷɪi̯m]	'dream'	Phonetic realization of the stressed, syllable-initial sequence /dr/; more commonly postalveolar [d̠͡ɹ̠˔]. See English phonology
Italian	Sicily	Adriatico	[äd͡ɹ̝iˈäːt̪iko]	'the Adriatic Sea'	Apical; regional realization of the sequence /dr/, and can be realized as the sequence [dɹ̝] instead. See Italian phonology

== See also ==
- Voiced dental affricate
- List of phonetics topics

== Notes ==
Place →	Labial					Coronal										Dorsal					Laryngeal			
Manner ↓	Bilabial		Labiodental		Linguolabial		Dental		Alveolar		Postalveolar		Retroflex		(Alveolo-)palatal		Velar		Uvular		Pharyngeal/epiglottal		Glottal	
Nasal	m̥	m	ɱ̊	ɱ		n̼	n̪̊	n̪	n̥	n	n̠̊	n̠	ɳ̊	ɳ	ɲ̊	ɲ	ŋ̊	ŋ	ɴ̥	ɴ				
Plosive	p	b	p̪	b̪	t̼	d̼	t̪	d̪	t	d			ʈ	ɖ	c	ɟ	k	ɡ	q	ɢ	ʡ		ʔ	
Sibilant affricate							t̪s̪	d̪z̪	ts	dz	t̠ʃ	d̠ʒ	tʂ	dʐ	tɕ	dʑ								
Non-sibilant affricate	pɸ	bβ	p̪f	b̪v			t̪θ	d̪ð	tɹ̝̊	dɹ̝	t̠ɹ̠̊˔	d̠ɹ̠˔			cç	ɟʝ	kx	ɡɣ	qχ	ɢʁ	ʡʜ	ʡʢ	ʔh	
Sibilant fricative							s̪	z̪	s	z	ʃ	ʒ	ʂ	ʐ	ɕ	ʑ								
Non-sibilant fricative	ɸ	β	f	v	θ̼	ð̼	θ	ð	θ̠	ð̠	ɹ̠̊˔	ɹ̠˔	ɻ̊˔	ɻ˔	ç	ʝ	x	ɣ	χ	ʁ	ħ	ʕ	h	ɦ
Approximant		β̞		ʋ				ð̞		ɹ		ɹ̠		ɻ		j		ɰ						˷
Tap/flap		ⱱ̟		ⱱ					ɾ̥	ɾ			ɽ̊	ɽ						ɢ̆		ʡ̆		
Trill	ʙ̥	ʙ							r̥	r		r̠	ɽ̊r̥	ɽr					ʀ̥	ʀ	ʜ	ʢ		
Lateral affricate									tɬ	dɮ			tꞎ	d𝼅	c𝼆	ɟʎ̝	k𝼄	ɡʟ̝						
Lateral fricative							ɬ̪		ɬ	ɮ			ꞎ	𝼅	𝼆	ʎ̝	𝼄	ʟ̝						
Lateral approximant								l̪	l̥	l		l̠	ɭ̊	ɭ	ʎ̥	ʎ	ʟ̥	ʟ		ʟ̠				
Lateral tap/flap									ɺ̥	ɺ			𝼈̊	𝼈		ʎ̆		ʟ̆						

		BL	LD	D	A	PA	RF	P	V	U
Implosive	Voiced	ɓ			ɗ		ᶑ	ʄ	ɠ	ʛ
Implosive	Voiceless	ɓ̥			ɗ̥		ᶑ̊	ʄ̊	ɠ̊	ʛ̥
Ejective	Stop	pʼ			tʼ		ʈʼ	cʼ	kʼ	qʼ
Ejective	Affricate		p̪fʼ	tθʼ	tsʼ	tʃʼ	tʂʼ	tɕʼ	kxʼ	qχʼ
Ejective	Fricative	ɸʼ	fʼ	θʼ	sʼ	ʃʼ	ʂʼ	ɕʼ	xʼ	χʼ
Ejective	Lateral affricate				tɬʼ			c𝼆ʼ	k𝼄ʼ	q𝼄ʼ
Ejective	Lateral fricative				ɬʼ					
Click (top: velar; bottom: uvular)	Tenuis	kʘ qʘ		kǀ qǀ	kǃ qǃ		k𝼊 q𝼊	kǂ qǂ		
Click (top: velar; bottom: uvular)	Voiced	ɡʘ ɢʘ		ɡǀ ɢǀ	ɡǃ ɢǃ		ɡ𝼊 ɢ𝼊	ɡǂ ɢǂ		
Click (top: velar; bottom: uvular)	Nasal	ŋʘ ɴʘ		ŋǀ ɴǀ	ŋǃ ɴǃ		ŋ𝼊 ɴ𝼊	ŋǂ ɴǂ	ʞ	
Click (top: velar; bottom: uvular)	Tenuis lateral				kǁ qǁ					
Click (top: velar; bottom: uvular)	Voiced lateral				ɡǁ ɢǁ					
Click (top: velar; bottom: uvular)	Nasal lateral				ŋǁ ɴǁ					
