= Voiced dental and alveolar nasals =

Consonantal sounds represented by ⟨n⟩ in IPA

Voiced alveolar nasal

n
- IPA number: 116

Audio sample
- source · help

Encoding
- Entity (decimal): &#110;
- Unicode (hex): U+006E
- X-SAMPA: n
- Braille: ⠝ (braille pattern dots-1345)
Image

Voiced dental nasal

n̪
- IPA number: 116 408

Audio sample
- source · help

Encoding
- Entity (decimal): &#110;&#810;
- Unicode (hex): U+006E U+032A
- X-SAMPA: n_d
- Braille: ⠝ (braille pattern dots-1345) ⠠ (braille pattern dots-6) ⠹ (braille pattern dots-1456)
Image

Voiced postalveolar nasal

n̠

Audio sample
- source · help

A voiced alveolar nasal is a type of consonantal sound used in numerous spoken languages. It is familiar to English-speakers as the ⟨n⟩ sound in nice. The symbol in the International Phonetic Alphabet that represents dental, alveolar, and postalveolar nasals is ⟨n⟩.

The vast majority of languages have either an alveolar or dental nasal. There are a few languages that lack either sound but have [m], such as Yoruba, Palauan, and colloquial Samoan (however, these languages all have [ŋ]. An example of a language without [n] and [ŋ] is Edo). There are some languages (e.g. Rotokas) that lack both [m] and [n].

True dental consonants are relatively uncommon. In the Romance, Dravidian, and Australian languages, n is often called "dental" in the literature. However, the rearmost contact, which gives a consonant its distinctive sound, is actually alveolar or denti-alveolar. The difference between the Romance languages and English is not so much where the tongue contacts the roof of the mouth but the part of the tongue that makes contact. In English, it is the tip of the tongue (such sounds are termed apical), but in the Romance languages, it is the flat of the tongue just above the tip (such sounds are called laminal).

However, there are languages with true apical dental n. It is found in the Mapuche language of South America, where it is actually interdental. A true dental generally occurs allophonically before /θ/ in the languages that have it, as in English tenth. Similarly, a denti-alveolar allophone occurs in languages that have denti-alveolar stops, as in Spanish cinta.

Some languages contrast laminal denti-alveolar and apical alveolar nasals. For example, in the Malayalam pronunciation of Nārāyanan, the first n is dental, the second is retroflex, and the third alveolar.

A voiced postalveolar nasal occurs in a number of Australian Aboriginal languages, including Djeebbana and Jingulu.

== Features ==
Sagittal sections of voiced dental and alveolar nasals

Features of a voiced alveolar nasal:

- Its manner of articulation is occlusive, which means it is produced by obstructing airflow in the vocal tract. Because the consonant is also nasal, the blocked airflow is redirected through the nose.
- There are four specific variants of [n]:
  - Dental, which means it is articulated with either the tip or the blade of the tongue at the upper teeth, termed respectively apical and laminal.
  - Denti-alveolar, which means it is articulated with the blade of the tongue at the alveolar ridge, and the tip of the tongue behind upper teeth.
  - Alveolar, which means it is articulated with either the tip or the blade of the tongue at the alveolar ridge, termed respectively apical and laminal.
  - Postalveolar, which means it is articulated with either the tip or the blade of the tongue behind the alveolar ridge, termed respectively apical and laminal.
- Its phonation is voiced, which means the vocal cords vibrate during the articulation.
- It is a nasal consonant, which means air is exclusively allowed to escape through the nose for nasal stops; otherwise, in addition to through the mouth.
- It is a median consonant, which means it is produced by directing the airstream down the midline of the tongue, rather than to the sides.
- Its airstream mechanism is pulmonic, which means it is articulated by pushing air only with the intercostal muscles and abdominal muscles, as in most speech sounds.

== Occurrence ==
=== Dental or denti-alveolar ===
Language		Word	IPA	Meaning	Notes
Belarusian		новы/novy	[ˈn̪ovɨ]	'new'	Laminal denti-alveolar. Contrasts with palatalized form. See Belarusian phonology
Bulgarian		жена/žena	[ʒɛˈn̪a]	'woman'	Laminal denti-alveolar.
Bengali		বন্ধ	[bɔn̪d̪ʱo]	ˈclose'	Allophone of /n̪/ after and before denti-alveolar /t̪, t̪ʰ, d̪, d̪ʱ/. See Bengali phonology
Catalan	Most dialects	cantar	[kən̪ˈt̪ä]	'to sing'	Laminal denti-alveolar. Allophone of /n/ before /t, d/. See Catalan phonology
Catalan	Some dialects	punt	[ˈpun̪]	'point'	Laminal denti-alveolar. Word-final realisation of /nt/, found mainly in Catalonia. Many Valencian dialects retain [nt].
Chuvash		шăна/šăna	[ʃɒn̪a]	'a fly'	
Dutch	Belgian	nicht	[n̻ɪxt̻]	'niece'	Laminal denti-alveolar, sometimes simply alveolar. See Dutch phonology
English		month	[mʌn̪θ]	'month'	Interdental. Allophone of /n/ before /θ, ð/.
Esperanto		Esperanto	[espeˈran̪t̪o]	'one who hopes'	See Esperanto phonology
Finnish		ranta	[ˈran̪t̪a]	'beach'	Allophone of /n/ before /t̪/.
French		connexion	[kɔn̻ɛksjɔ̃]	'connection'	Laminal denti-alveolar, sometimes simply alveolar. See French phonology
Greek		άνθος/ánthos	[ˈɐn̪θo̞s]	'flower'	Interdental. Allophone of /n/. See Modern Greek phonology
Hindustani	Hindi	नया/najā	[n̪əjaː]	'new'	See Hindi–Urdu phonology
Hindustani	Urdu	نیا/najā	[n̪əjaː]	'new'	See Hindi–Urdu phonology
Hmong	White Hmong	𖬒𖬲𖬬/noj	[no˥˨]	'eat'	
Hungarian		nagyi	[ˈn̪ɒɟi]	'grandma'	Laminal denti-alveolar. See Hungarian phonology
Italian		cantare	[kän̪ˈt̪äːre]	'to sing'	Laminal denti-alveolar. Allophone of /n/ before /t, d, s, z, t͡s, d͡z/. See Italian phonology
Irish		naoi	[n̪ˠɰiː]	'nine'	Velarized.
Japanese		涙/namida	[n̪ämʲid̪ä]	'tear'	Laminal denti-alveolar. See Japanese phonology
Kashubian		naprësk	[n̪aprəsk]	'shower'	Laminal denti-alveolar.
Kazakh		көрінді/körindi/ٴكورىندى	[kœɾɪn̪d̪ɪ]	'it seemed'	Laminal denti-alveolar. Allophone of /n/ before /t, d/.
Kyrgyz		беделинде/bedelinde	[be̞d̪e̞lin̪d̪e̞]	'in the authority'	Laminal denti-alveolar. Allophone of /n/ before /t, d/.
Latvian		nakts	[n̪äkt̪s̪]	'night'	Laminal denti-alveolar. See Latvian phonology
Macedonian		нос/nos	[n̪o̞s̪]	'nose'	Laminal denti-alveolar. See Macedonian phonology
Malayalam		നായ/nāya	[n̪aːjɐ]	'dog'	Interdental for some speakers. See Malayalam phonology
Mapudungun		müṉa	[mɘ̝ˈn̪ɐ̝]	'male cousin on father's side'	Interdental.
Marathi		नख/nakh	[n̪əkʰ]	'fingernail'	See Marathi phonology
Nepali		सुगन्ध	[suˈɡʌn̪d̪ʱʌ]	'fraɡrance'	Allophone of /n/ in neighbourhood of /t̪, t̪ʰ, d̪, d̪ʱ/.
Polish		nos	[n̪ɔs̪]	'nose'	Laminal denti-alveolar. Alveolar before /t͡ʂ, d͡ʐ/. See Polish phonology
Portuguese	General	narina	[n̻ɐˈɾin̻ɐ]	'nostril'	Laminal denti-alveolar. May nasalize preceding vowel (especially if stressed). Has [ɲ̟] as allophone, forming from clusters with [j], and before /i/.
Portuguese	Vernacular Paulista	percebendo	[pe̞ʁse̞ˈbẽn̻u]	'perceiving'	Laminal denti-alveolar. Allophone of /d/ after a stressed nasal vowel in more stigmatized varieties. See Portuguese phonology
Romanian		alună	[äˈl̪un̪ə]	'hazelnut'	Laminal denti-alveolar. See Romanian phonology
Russian		наш/naš	[n̪aʂ]	'our'	Laminal denti-alveolar, contrasts with palatalized form. See Russian phonology
Scottish Gaelic		nàdar	[ˈn̪ˠaːt̪aɾ]	'nature'	Velarized. Contrasts with alveolar /n/ and palatal /ɲ/.
Serbo-Croatian		студент/student	[s̪t̪ǔd̪e̞n̪t̪]	'student'	Laminal denti-alveolar. Allophone of /n/ before /t, d, s, z, t͡s/. See Serbo-Croatian phonology
Slovene		prevarant	[pɾeʋaˈɾǎːn̪t̪]	'con artist'	Laminal denti-alveolar. Allophone of /n/ before /t, d, s, z, t͡s/. See Slovene phonology
Spanish	Most dialects	cantar	[kän̪ˈt̪är]	'to sing'	Laminal denti-alveolar. Allophone of /n/ before /t, d/. See Spanish phonology
Swahili	Bajuni dialect	paṉa/pan̪a/pan’a	[pan̪a]	'rat'	Dental. Orthography is variable.
Tamil		நாடு/nāḍu	[n̪ɑːɖɯ]	'country'	See Tamil phonology
Telugu		నములుట/namuluṭa	[n̪amuluʈa]	'To chew'	Occurs as an allophone of anuswara when followed by dental stops.
Ukrainian		наш/nash	[n̪ɑʃ]	'our'	Laminal denti-alveolar, contrasts with palatalized form. See Ukrainian phonology
Uzbek		нимa/nima/نىمه	[n̪imæ]	'what'	Laminal denti-alveolar.

=== Alveolar ===
Language		Word	IPA	Meaning	Notes
Adyghe		нэфнэ/nėfnė	[nafna]	'light'	
Arabic	Standard	نور/nūr	[nuːr]	'light'	See Arabic phonology
Assyrian		ܢܘܪܐ/nōra	[noːɾaː]	'mirror'	
Basque		ni	[ni]	'I'	
Bengali		নাক/naak/nāk	[nɐk]	'nose'	See Bengali phonology
Breton		nedeleg	['nedeːlek]	'christmas'	
Cantonese		年/nìhn	[ni:n˨˩]	'year'	See Cantonese phonology
Catalan		neu	[ˈn̺ew]	'snow'	Apical. See Catalan phonology
Czech		na	[na]	'on'	See Czech phonology
Dutch		nacht	[nɑxt]	'night'	See Dutch phonology
English		nice	[naɪs]	'nice'	See English phonology
Finnish		annan	[ˈɑnːɑn]	'I give'	See Finnish phonology
German		fünf	[fʏnf]	'five'	See German phonology
Georgian		კანი/k'ani	[ˈkʼɑni]	'skin'	
Greek		νάμα/náma	[ˈnama]	'communion wine'	See Modern Greek phonology
Gujarati		નહી/nahi	[nəhi]	'no'	See Gujarati phonology
Hawaiian		naka	[naka]	'to shake'	See Hawaiian phonology
Hebrew		נבון/navon	[navon]	'wise'	See Modern Hebrew phonology
Italian		nano	[ˈnäːno]	'dwarf'	See Italian phonology
Irish		binn	[bʲiːnʲ]	'peak'	Palatalized.
Khmer		នគរ nôkôr	[nɔkɔː]	'kingdom'	See Khmer phonology
Korean		나라/nara	[nɐɾɐ]	'country'	See Korean phonology
Kurdish	Northern	giyanewer	[ˈgʲɪjä:ˈnɛwɛˈɾ]	'animal'	See Kurdish phonology
Kurdish	Central	گیانلەبەر/gîyânlabar	[ˈgʲiːäːnˈlæbæˈɾ]	'animal'	See Kurdish phonology
Kurdish	Southern	گیانلەبەر/gîyânlabar	[ˈgʲiːäːnˈlabaˈɾ]	'animal'	See Kurdish phonology
Kyrgyz		банан/banan	[baˈnan]	'banana'	
Malay		nasi	[näsi]	'cooked rice'	
Malayalam		ആന	[äːnə]	'elephant'	See Malayalam phonology
Maltese		lenbuba	[lenbuˈba]	'truncheon'	
Mandarin		難/难/nán	[nan˧˥]	'difficult'	See Mandarin phonology
Mapudungun		müna	[mɘ̝ˈnɐ̝]	'enough'	
Ngwe	Mmockngie dialect	[nøɣə̀]		'sun'	
Nepali		नक्कल/nakkal	[nʌkːʌl]	'imitation'	See Nepali phonology
Odia		ନାକ/nāka	[näkɔ]	'nose'	
Okinawan		ʻnmu	[ʔn̩mu]	'potato'	Can occur as onset, nucleus, or coda. Allophone of [m], [ŋ], and [ɴ] in coda, but phonemic elsewhere.
Persian		نون/nun	[nun]	'bread'	
Pirahã		gíxai	[níˈʔàì̯]	'you'	
Polish		poncz	[ˈpɔn̥t͡ʂ]	'punch'	Allophone of /n/ (which is normally laminal denti-alveolar [n̪]) before /t͡ʂ, d͡ʐ/. See Polish phonology
Punjabi		ਨੱਕ/nakk	[nəkː]	'nose'	
Scottish Gaelic		anail	[ˈãnal]	'breath'	Contrasts with velarised dental /n̪ˠ/ and palatal /ɲ/.
Slovak		na	[nä]	'on'	
Slovene	Common	novice	[noˈʋìːt̪͡s̪ɛ́]	'news'	
Slovene	Some speakers	konj	[ˈkɔ̂nː]	'horse'	See Slovene phonology
Spanish		nada	[ˈnäð̞ä]	'nothing'	See Spanish phonology
Swahili		ndizi	[n̩dizi]	'banana'	
Tagalog		nipis	[nipis]	'thin'	Tagalog phonology
Thai		นอน/non	[nɔːn]	'sleep'	See Thai phonology
Toki Pona		noka	[noka]	'foot'	
Turkish		neden	[ne̞d̪æn]	'reason'	See Turkish phonology
Tamil		மனசு/manasu	[mʌnʌsɯ]	'mind', 'heart'	See Tamil phonology
Vietnamese		bạn đi	[ɓanˀ˧˨ʔ ɗi]	'you're going'	Occurs only before alveolar consonants. See Vietnamese phonology
Welsh		nain	[nain]	'grandmother'	See Welsh phonology
Western Apache		non	[nòn]	'cache'	
West Frisian		nekke	[ˈnɛkə]	'neck'	
Yi		ꆅ/na	[na˧ ]	'hurt'	
Zapotec	Tilquiapan	nanɨɨ	[nanɨˀɨ]	'lady'	Contrasts with a fortis alveolar nasal that is not represented in the orthography.

=== Postalveolar ===
Language		Word	IPA	Meaning	Notes
Bengali		কণ্ঠ	[kɔṉt̠ʰo]	'voice'	Allophone of /ṉ/ after and before postalveolar /t̠, t̠ʰ, d̠, d̠ʱ/. See Bengali phonology
Catalan		panxa	[ˈpãn̠(t͡)ɕə]	'belly'	Allophone of /n/ before /ʃ, ʒ, t͡ʃ, d͡ʒ/ ([ɕ, ʑ, t͡ɕ, d͡ʑ]), may be alveolo-palatal instead. See Catalan phonology
Djeebbana		barnmarramarlón̠a	[ban̠maramal̠ɔn̪a]	'they two swam'	Result of rhotic plus alveolar [n].
English	Australian	enrol	[əṉˈɹ̠ɔo̯ɫ]	'enrol'	Allophone of /n/ before /r/. See Australian English phonology
Italian		angelo	[ˈän̠ʲːd͡ʒelo]	'angel'	Palatalized laminal; allophone of /n/ before /ʃ, t͡ʃ, d͡ʒ/. See Italian phonology

=== Variable ===
Language		Word	IPA	Meaning	Notes
English	Scottish	nice	[nəis]	'nice'	Laminal denti-alveolar for some speakers, alveolar for other speakers.
English	Welsh	nice	[nəis]	'nice'	Laminal denti-alveolar for some speakers, alveolar for other speakers.
German	Standard	Lanze	[ˈlant͡sə]	'lance'	Varies between laminal denti-alveolar, laminal alveolar and apical alveolar. See Standard German phonology
Norwegian	Urban East	mann	[mɑn̻ː]	'man'	Varies between laminal denti-alveolar and laminal alveolar. See Norwegian phonology
Swedish	Central Standard	nu	[nʉ̟ː]	'now'	Varies between laminal denti-alveolar and alveolar, with the former being predominant. See Swedish phonology

== See also ==
- Index of phonetics articles

== Notes ==
Place →	Labial					Coronal										Dorsal					Laryngeal			
Manner ↓	Bilabial		Labiodental		Linguolabial		Dental		Alveolar		Postalveolar		Retroflex		(Alveolo-)palatal		Velar		Uvular		Pharyngeal/epiglottal		Glottal	
Nasal	m̥	m	ɱ̊	ɱ		n̼	n̪̊	n̪	n̥	n	n̠̊	n̠	ɳ̊	ɳ	ɲ̊	ɲ	ŋ̊	ŋ	ɴ̥	ɴ				
Plosive	p	b	p̪	b̪	t̼	d̼	t̪	d̪	t	d			ʈ	ɖ	c	ɟ	k	ɡ	q	ɢ	ʡ		ʔ	
Sibilant affricate							t̪s̪	d̪z̪	ts	dz	t̠ʃ	d̠ʒ	tʂ	dʐ	tɕ	dʑ								
Non-sibilant affricate	pɸ	bβ	p̪f	b̪v			t̪θ	d̪ð	tɹ̝̊	dɹ̝	t̠ɹ̠̊˔	d̠ɹ̠˔			cç	ɟʝ	kx	ɡɣ	qχ	ɢʁ	ʡʜ	ʡʢ	ʔh	
Sibilant fricative							s̪	z̪	s	z	ʃ	ʒ	ʂ	ʐ	ɕ	ʑ								
Non-sibilant fricative	ɸ	β	f	v	θ̼	ð̼	θ	ð	θ̠	ð̠	ɹ̠̊˔	ɹ̠˔	ɻ̊˔	ɻ˔	ç	ʝ	x	ɣ	χ	ʁ	ħ	ʕ	h	ɦ
Approximant		β̞		ʋ				ð̞		ɹ		ɹ̠		ɻ		j		ɰ						˷
Tap/flap		ⱱ̟		ⱱ					ɾ̥	ɾ			ɽ̊	ɽ						ɢ̆		ʡ̆		
Trill	ʙ̥	ʙ							r̥	r		r̠	ɽ̊r̥	ɽr					ʀ̥	ʀ	ʜ	ʢ		
Lateral affricate									tɬ	dɮ			tꞎ	d𝼅	c𝼆	ɟʎ̝	k𝼄	ɡʟ̝						
Lateral fricative							ɬ̪		ɬ	ɮ			ꞎ	𝼅	𝼆	ʎ̝	𝼄	ʟ̝						
Lateral approximant								l̪	l̥	l		l̠	ɭ̊	ɭ	ʎ̥	ʎ	ʟ̥	ʟ		ʟ̠				
Lateral tap/flap									ɺ̥	ɺ			𝼈̊	𝼈		ʎ̆		ʟ̆						

		BL	LD	D	A	PA	RF	P	V	U
Implosive	Voiced	ɓ			ɗ		ᶑ	ʄ	ɠ	ʛ
Implosive	Voiceless	ɓ̥			ɗ̥		ᶑ̊	ʄ̊	ɠ̊	ʛ̥
Ejective	Stop	pʼ			tʼ		ʈʼ	cʼ	kʼ	qʼ
Ejective	Affricate		p̪fʼ	tθʼ	tsʼ	tʃʼ	tʂʼ	tɕʼ	kxʼ	qχʼ
Ejective	Fricative	ɸʼ	fʼ	θʼ	sʼ	ʃʼ	ʂʼ	ɕʼ	xʼ	χʼ
Ejective	Lateral affricate				tɬʼ			c𝼆ʼ	k𝼄ʼ	q𝼄ʼ
Ejective	Lateral fricative				ɬʼ					
Click (top: velar; bottom: uvular)	Tenuis	kʘ qʘ		kǀ qǀ	kǃ qǃ		k𝼊 q𝼊	kǂ qǂ		
Click (top: velar; bottom: uvular)	Voiced	ɡʘ ɢʘ		ɡǀ ɢǀ	ɡǃ ɢǃ		ɡ𝼊 ɢ𝼊	ɡǂ ɢǂ		
Click (top: velar; bottom: uvular)	Nasal	ŋʘ ɴʘ		ŋǀ ɴǀ	ŋǃ ɴǃ		ŋ𝼊 ɴ𝼊	ŋǂ ɴǂ	ʞ	
Click (top: velar; bottom: uvular)	Tenuis lateral				kǁ qǁ					
Click (top: velar; bottom: uvular)	Voiced lateral				ɡǁ ɢǁ					
Click (top: velar; bottom: uvular)	Nasal lateral				ŋǁ ɴǁ					
