= Latvian phonology =

Phonology of the Latvian language

This article is about the phonology of Latvian. It deals with synchronic phonology as well as phonetics.

== Consonants ==
Table adopted from Nau (1998:6)

		Labial	Dental/ Alveolar	Postalv./ Palatal	Velar
Nasal		m	n̪	ɲ	
Plosive	voiceless	p	t̪	c	k
Plosive	voiced	b	d̪	ɟ	ɡ
Affricate	voiceless		t̪͡s̪	t͡ʃ	
Affricate	voiced		d̪͡z̪	d͡ʒ	
Fricative	voiceless	(f)	s̪	ʃ	(x)
Fricative	voiced	v	z̪	ʒ	
Approximant	median			j	
Approximant	lateral		l	ʎ	
Trill			r	(rʲ)	

- /n t d t͡s d͡z s z/ are denti-alveolar, while /l r/ are alveolar.
- The consonant sounds /f x/ are only found in loanwords.
- [ŋ] is only an allophone of nasals before velars /k/ and /ɡ/.
- Latvian plosives are not aspirated (unlike in English).
- Voiced and voiceless consonants assimilate to the subsequent consonant, e.g. apgabals [ˈabɡabals] or labs [ˈlaps].
- Consonants can be short or long; long consonants are represented with double letters in the orthography: mamma [ˈmamːa].
- Plosives and fricatives that occur between two short vowels are lengthened, as in upe [ˈupːe], and words spelt with ⟨zs⟩, pronounced as /sː/, or ⟨šs⟩ or ⟨žs⟩, both pronounced as [ʃː].
- A palatalized dental trill /rʲ/ is still used in some dialects (mainly outside Latvia) but quite rarely, and hence the letter ⟨Ŗ ŗ⟩ was removed from the alphabet.

== Vowels ==
Latvian has six vowels, with length as distinctive feature:

	Front		Central		Back	
	short	long	short	long	short	long
Close	i	iː			u	uː
Mid	e	eː			(ɔ)	(ɔː)
Open	æ	æː	a	aː		

- /e ɔ æ/ are more accurately described as close-mid, open-mid and near-open respectively.

/ɔ ɔː/, and the diphthongs involving it other than /uɔ/, are confined to loanwords.

The vowel length ratio is about 1:2.5. Vowel length is phonemic and plays an important role in the language. For example, koka [ˈkuɔka] means 'made of wood', kokā [ˈkuɔkaː] means 'on the tree'; pile [ˈpile] means 'a drop', and pīle [ˈpiːle] means 'a duck'.

Latvian also has 10 diphthongs (/ai ui ɛi au iɛ uɔ iu (ɔi) ɛu (ɔu)/), although some diphthongs are mostly limited to proper names and interjections.

== Pitch accent ==
Standard Latvian and, with a few minor exceptions, all of the Latvian dialects, have fixed initial stress. Long vowels and diphthongs have a tone, regardless of their position in the word. This includes the so-called "mixed diphthongs", composed of a short vowel followed by a sonorant. There are three types of tones:

level (also drawling, sustained) tone (stieptā intonācija)
denoted by a tilde [ ̃]
high throughout the syllable
e.g., loks [ˉluɔ̯ks] ('spring onion')
falling tone (krītošā intonācija)
denoted by a grave accent [ ̀]
brief rise followed by a long fall
e.g., loks [ˋluɔ̯ks] ('arch')
broken tone (lauztā intonācija)
denoted by a circumflex [ ̂]
rising tone followed by falling tone with interruption in the middle or some creakiness in the voice
e.g., logs [˜luɔ̯ks] ('window')

Besides the three-tone system of the standard variety, there are also Latvian dialects with only two tones: in western Latvia, the broken tone has merged into the falling tone. In eastern Latvia the level tone has merged into the falling tone. Hence, the Central Latvian traũks, dràugs, raûgs correspond to Western Latvian traũks, draùgs, raùgs, and to Eastern Latvian tràuks, dràugs, raûgs.

This system is phonetically more or less similar to the ones found in Lithuanian, Swedish, Norwegian and Serbo-Croatian. The broken tone has some similarity to the Danish stød.

== Alternations ==
Latvian roots may alternate between [v] and [u] depending on whether the following segment is a vowel or a consonant. For example, the root Daugav- ('Daugava River') in the nominative case is [dauɡava], but is pronounced [dauɡaupils] in the city name Daugavpils. In this example, the vocalic alternant [u] is realized as the off-glide of the diphthong /au/. However, when following a vowel that does not form an attested Latvian diphthong (for example, [iu]), [u] is pronounced as a monophthong, as in [zius] ('fish-NOM.SG.'; cf. [zivis] 'fish-NOM.PL.').
