= Macedonian phonology =

Sounds and pronunciation of the Macedonian language

This article discusses the phonological system of Standard Macedonian (unless otherwise noted) based on the Prilep-Bitola dialect. For discussion of other dialects, see Macedonian dialects. Macedonian possesses five vowels, one semivowel, three liquid consonants, three nasal stops, three pairs of fricatives, two pairs of affricates, a non-paired voiceless fricative, nine pairs of voiced and unvoiced consonants and four pairs of stops.

== Vowels ==
Vowels
	Front	Central	Back
Close	i		u
Mid	ɛ	(ə)	ɔ
Open		a	

=== Schwa ===
The schwa is phonemic in many dialects (varying in closeness to [ʌ] or [ɨ]) but its use in the standard language is marginal. It is written with an apostrophe: ’рж, за’ржи, В’чков, К’чев, К’шање, С’лп. It can also be used for dialectal effect, e.g., к’смет, с’нце. When spelling aloud, each consonant is followed by the schwa. The individual letters of acronyms are pronounced with the schwa in the same way: МПЦ ([mə.pə.t͡sə]). The lexicalized acronyms СССР ([ɛs.ɛs.ɛs.ɛr]) and МТ ([ɛm.tɛ]) (a brand of cigarettes), are among the few exceptions.

=== Vowel length ===
Vowel length is not phonemic. Vowels in stressed open syllables in disyllabic words with stress on the penult can be realized as long, e.g., Велес [ˈvɛːlɛs] 'Veles'. The sequence /aa/ is often realized phonetically as [aː]; e.g., саат /saat/ [saːt] 'hour'.

== Consonants ==
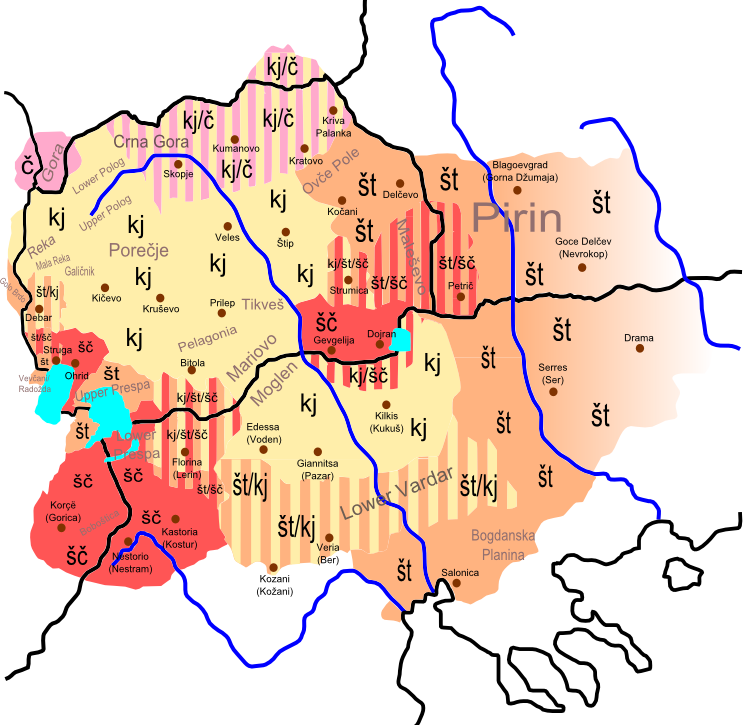
Map of the use of the intervocalic phoneme kj in Macedonian (1962)

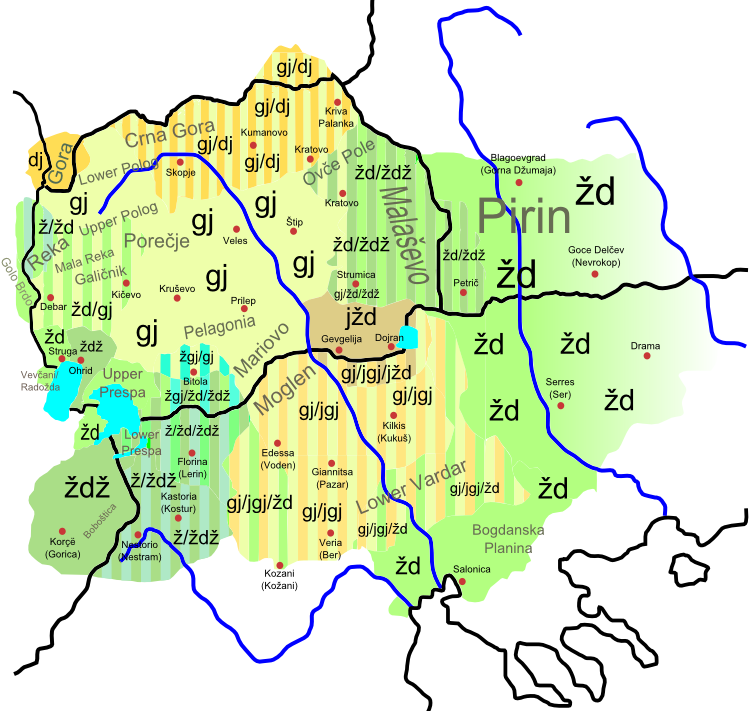
Map of the use of the intervocalic phoneme gj in Macedonian (1962)

Consonants
		Labial	Dental	Alveolar	Post- alveolar	Palatal	Velar
Nasal		m	n^{^{3}}			ɲ	
Plosive	voiceless	p	t			c^{^{1}}	k
Plosive	voiced	b	d			ɟ^{^{1}}	g
Affricate	voiceless		ts		tʃ		
Affricate	voiced		dz		dʒ		
Fricative	voiceless	f	s		ʃ		x^{^{4}}
Fricative	voiced	v	z		ʒ		
Approximant			ɫ^{^{2,}}^{^{3}}	l^{^{2}}		j	
Trill				r			

^1 /c/ and /ɟ/ are officially dorsal-palatal plosives, and some speakers pronounce them that way. They have various other pronunciations, depending on dialect. In some Northern Macedonian dialects they are alveolo-palatal affricates [t͡ɕ] and [d͡ʑ] (just like in Serbo-Croatian), while in the urban Prilep subdialect of the Prilep-Bitola dialect, they have merged into /t͡ʃ/ and /d͡ʒ/, respectively.

^2 The velarised dental lateral /ɫ/ (always written ⟨л⟩) and the non-velarised alveolar lateral /l/ contrast in minimal pairs such as бела /ˈbɛɫa/ 'white' and беља /ˈbɛla/ 'trouble'. Before /ɛ/, /i/, and /j/, only /l/ occurs and is then written ⟨л⟩ instead of ⟨љ⟩.

^3 The alveolar trill (/r/) is syllabic between two consonants, e.g., прст [ˈpr̩st] 'finger'. The dental nasal (/n/) and velarised lateral (/ɫ/) are also syllabic in certain foreign words, e.g., њутн [ˈɲutn̩] 'newton', Попокатепетл [pɔpɔkaˈtɛpɛtɫ̩] 'Popocatépetl'.

^4 The velar fricative /x/ does not occur natively in the language. It has been introduced or retained in Standard Macedonian under the following circumstances: (1) new foreign words: хотел /xɔˈtɛɫ/ 'hotel', (2) toponyms: Охрид /ˈɔxrit/ 'Ohrid', (3) Church Slavonicisms: дух /dux/ 'spirit', (4) new literary words: доход /ˈdɔxɔt/ 'income', and (5) to disambiguate between potential homophones: ⟨храна⟩ /ˈxrana/ 'food' vs. ⟨рана⟩ /ˈrana/ 'injury, wound'.

== Phonological processes ==
At morpheme boundaries (represented in spelling) and at the end of a word (not represented in spelling), voicing opposition is neutralized.

== Stress ==
The word stress in Macedonian is antepenultimate, meaning it falls on the third from last syllable in words with three or more syllables, and on the first or only syllable in other words. This is sometimes disregarded when the word has entered the language more recently or from a foreign source. The following rules apply:

- Disyllabic words are stressed on the second-to-last syllable, e.g., дете [ˈdɛtɛ] 'child', мајка [ˈmajka] 'mother', and ⟨татко⟩ [ˈtatkɔ] 'father'.
- Trisyllabic and polysyllabic words are stressed on the third-to-last syllable, e.g., планина [ˈpɫanina] 'mountain', планината [pɫaˈninata] 'the mountain', and планинарите [pɫaniˈnaritɛ] 'the mountaineers'.

Exceptions include:

- Verbal adverbs, which are suffixed with ⟨-jќи⟩: e.g., викајќи [viˈkajci] 'shouting', одејќи [ɔˈdɛjci] 'walking'.
- Foreign loanwords: e.g., клише [kliˈʃɛ] 'cliché', генеза [ɡɛˈnɛza] 'genesis', литература [litɛraˈtura] 'literature', Александар [alɛkˈsandar], 'Alexander'.

== Bibliography ==
- Friedman, Victor (2001a). "Macedonian". SEELRC. Duke University. Archived from the original on 15 August 2023.
- Lunt, Horace G. (1952). Grammar of the Macedonian Literary Language. Skopje. OCLC 5137976.
