= Voiced postalveolar fricative =

Consonantal sound often represented by ⟨ʒ⟩ in IPA

ʒ
- IPA number: 135

Audio sample
- source · help

Encoding
- Entity (decimal): &#658;
- Unicode (hex): U+0292
- X-SAMPA: Z
- Braille: ⠮ (braille pattern dots-2346)
Image

A voiced postalveolar or palato-alveolar fricative is a type of consonantal sound used in some spoken languages. It is familiar to many if not most English-speakers as the "s" sound in "fusion".

The sound is represented in the International Phonetic Alphabet with the letter ⟨ʒ⟩. The International Phonetic Association uses the phrase voiced postalveolar fricative for the sibilant sound [ʒ], though technically it also describes the voiced postalveolar non-sibilant fricative [ɹ̠˔], for which there are significant perceptual differences.

== Voiced palato-alveolar fricative ==
A voiced palato-alveolar fricative or voiced domed postalveolar fricative is a type of consonantal sound, used in some spoken languages.

Sagittal section of a voiced palato-alveolar fricative

=== Transcription ===
The symbol in the International Phonetic Alphabet that represents this sound is the lower case form of the letter Ezh ⟨Ʒ ʒ⟩ (/ɛʒ/). An alternative symbol used in some older and American linguistic literature is ⟨ž⟩, a z with a caron. In some transcriptions of alphabets such as the Cyrillic, the sound is represented by the digraph ⟨zh⟩.

Although present in English, the sound is not represented by a specific letter or digraph, but is formed by yod-coalescence of [z] and [j] in words such as measure. It also appears in some loanwords, mainly from French (thus written with ⟨g⟩ and ⟨j⟩).

[ʒ] occurs as a borrowed phoneme in a number of languages under the influence of French, Persian or Slavic languages, as in the Germanic languages (Dutch, English, German and Luxembourgish), the Romance languages (Italian and Romanian), the Turkic languages (Azerbaijani, Bashkir, Turkish, and Uyghur), and the Uralic languages (Estonian and Hungarian), Breton and Maltese. The phoneme has the lowest consonant frequency in both English and Persian.

In English and French, /ʒ/ may have simultaneous lip rounding ([ʒʷ]), although this is rarely indicated in transcription.

=== Features ===
Features of a voiced palato-alveolar fricative:

- Its manner of articulation is sibilant (a subclass of fricatives and affricates), which means it is generally produced with a higher-frequency turbulence. Sibilants may be articulated with various tongue shapes and degrees of palatalization, depending on their place of articulation.
- Its place of articulation is postalveolar, which means it is articulated with the tip or blade of the tongue behind the alveolar ridge.
- Its phonation is voiced, which means the vocal cords vibrate during the articulation.
- It is an oral consonant, which means that air is not allowed to escape through the nose.
- It is a median consonant, which means it is produced by directing the airstream down the midline of the tongue, rather than to the sides.
- Its airstream mechanism is pulmonic, which means it is articulated by pushing air only with the intercostal muscles and abdominal muscles, as in most speech sounds.

=== Occurrence ===
Language		Word	IPA	Meaning	Notes
Adyghe		жакӀэ/žač'a جاچئا	[ʒaːtʃʼa]	'beard'	
Albanian		zhurmë	[ʒuɾm]	'noise'	
Arabic	Levantine	مجنون / majnūn	[maʒˈnuːn]	'crazy'	
Arabic	Maghrebi	زوج / zūj	[zuːʒ]	'husband'	
Arabic	Hejazi	جاهِز / jāhiz	[ʒaːhɪz]	'ready'	An allophone of /d͡ʒ/ used by a number of speakers.
Armenian	Eastern	ժամ/žam	[ʒɑm]	'hour'	
Assyrian		ܐܘܪܡܓ̰ܢܝܐ Urmižnaiya	[urmɪʒnaɪja]	'Assyrian from Urmia'	
Avar		жакъа/žaq'a ژاقا	[ˈʒaqʼːa]	'today'	
Azerbaijani		jalüz ژالۆز	[ʒalyz]	'blinds'	Only occurs in loanwords.
Berta		[ŋɔ̀nʒɔ̀ʔ]		'honey'	
Breton		jod	[ʒod]	'play'	
Bulgarian		мъжът/myžyt	[mɐˈʒɤ̞t̪]	'the man'	See Bulgarian phonology
Catalan	Some speakers	ajut	[əˈʒut̪]	'help' (n.)	Its pronunciation varies between an alveolo-palatal [ʑ] and a postalveolar [ʒ] fricative. See Catalan phonology
Catalan	Some speakers	peix blau	[ˈpe(j)ʒ ˈβɫɑw]	'blue fish'	Its pronunciation varies between an alveolo-palatal [ʑ] and a postalveolar [ʒ] fricative. See Catalan phonology
Chechen		жий / žiy ژی	[ʒiː]	'sheep'	
Chinese	Quzhou dialect	床	[ʒɑ̃]	'bed'	
Chinese	Fuzhou dialect	只隻	[tsi˥˥ ʒieʔ˨˦]	'this one'	
Corsican		ghjesgia	[ˈɟeːʒa]	'church'	Also in Gallurese
Czech		muži	[ˈmuʒɪ]	'men'	See Czech phonology
Dutch		garage	[ɣäˈräːʒə]	'garage'	Only occurs in loanwords. See Dutch phonology.
Emilian	Bolognese	chèṡ	[ˈkɛːð̠]	'case'	Apical; not labialized; may be [z̺ʲ] or [ʐ] instead.
English		vision	[ˈvɪʒən]	'vision'	See English phonology
Esperanto		manĝaĵo	[mänˈd͡ʒäʒo̞]	'food'	See Esperanto phonology
French		jour	[ʒuʁ]	'day'	See French phonology
German	Standard	Garage	[ɡaˈʁaːʒʷə]	'garage'	Laminal or apico-laminal and strongly labialized. Some speakers may merge it with /ʃ/. Only occurs in loanwords. See Standard German phonology
Georgian		ჟურნალი/žurnali	[ʒuɾnali]	'magazine'	
Goemai		zhiem	[ʒiem]	'sickle'	
Greek	Cypriot	γαλάζ̌ο/galažo	[ɣ̞ɐˈlɐʒːo̞]	'sky blue'	
Gwich’in		zhòh	[ʒôh]	'wolf'	
Hän		zhùr	[ʒûr]	'wolf'	
Hebrew		ז׳אנר/žaner	[ʒaneʁ]	'genre'	Phoneme present in loanwords only. See Modern Hebrew phonology
Hindustani	Hindi	अझ़दहा/aždahá	[əʒd̪əhaː]	'dragon'	Only occurs in loanwords. See Hindustani phonology
Hindustani	Urdu	اژدہا/aždahá	[əʒd̪əhaː]	'dragon'	Only occurs in loanwords. See Hindustani phonology
Hungarian		rózsa	[ˈr̪oːʒɒ]	'rose'	See Hungarian phonology
Ingush		жий/žiy	[ʒiː]	'sheep'	
Italian	Tuscan	pigiare	[piˈʒäːre]	'press'	See Italian phonology
Judaeo-Spanish		mujer	[muˈʒɛr]	'woman'	
Juǀʼhoan		ju	[ʒu]	'person'	
Kabardian		жыг/žëğ	[ʒəɣʲ]	'tree'	
Kabyle		jeddi / جَدّي	[ʒəddi]	'my grandfather'	
Kashubian		kòżdi rôz	[kʷʒdi rɞz]	'constantly'	
Kazakh		жеті/jeti/ ژەتی	[ʒetɘ]	'seven'	
Latvian		žāvēt	[ˈʒäːveːt̪]	'to dry'	See Latvian phonology
Ligurian		lüxe	['ly:ʒe]	'light'	
Limburgish	Maastrichtian	zjuweleer	[ʒy̠β̞əˈleːʀ̝̊]	'jeweller'	Laminal post-alveolar with an unclear amount of palatalization.
Lithuanian		žmona	[ʒmoːˈn̪ɐ]	'wife'	See Lithuanian phonology
Livonian		kūž	[kuːʒ]	'six'	
Lombard	Western	resgiôra	[reˈʒu(ː)ra]	'matriarch'	
Macedonian		жaбa/žaba	[ˈʒaba]	'toad'	See Macedonian phonology
Megrelian		ჟირი/žiri	[ʒiɾi]	'two'	
Navajo		łizh	[ɬiʒ]	'urine'	
Neapolitan		sbattere	[ˈʒbɑttərə]	'to slam'	
Ngas		zhaam	[ʒaːm]	'chin'	
Ngwe	Mmockngie dialect	[ʒíá]		'to split'	
Occitan	Auvergnat	argent	[aʀʒẽ]	'money'	Southern dialects
Occitan	Gascon	argent	[arʒen]	'money'	
Pashto		ژوول/žowul	[ʒowul]	'chew'	
Persian		مژه/može	[moʒe]	'eyelash'	See Persian phonology
Polish	Gmina Istebna	zielony	[ʒɛˈlɔn̪ɘ]	'green'	/ʐ/ and /ʑ/ merge into [ʒ] in these dialects. In standard Polish, /ʒ/ is commonly used to transcribe what actually is a laminal voiced retroflex sibilant.
Polish	Lubawa dialect	zielony	[ʒɛˈlɔn̪ɘ]	'green'	/ʐ/ and /ʑ/ merge into [ʒ] in these dialects. In standard Polish, /ʒ/ is commonly used to transcribe what actually is a laminal voiced retroflex sibilant.
Polish	Malbork dialect	zielony	[ʒɛˈlɔn̪ɘ]	'green'	/ʐ/ and /ʑ/ merge into [ʒ] in these dialects. In standard Polish, /ʒ/ is commonly used to transcribe what actually is a laminal voiced retroflex sibilant.
Polish	Ostróda dialect	zielony	[ʒɛˈlɔn̪ɘ]	'green'	/ʐ/ and /ʑ/ merge into [ʒ] in these dialects. In standard Polish, /ʒ/ is commonly used to transcribe what actually is a laminal voiced retroflex sibilant.
Polish	Warmia dialect	zielony	[ʒɛˈlɔn̪ɘ]	'green'	/ʐ/ and /ʑ/ merge into [ʒ] in these dialects. In standard Polish, /ʒ/ is commonly used to transcribe what actually is a laminal voiced retroflex sibilant.
Portuguese		loja	[ˈlɔʒɐ]	'store'	Also described as alveolo-palatal [ʑ]. See Portuguese phonology
Romani		žanel	[ʒanel]	'to know'	
Romanian		jar	[ʒär]	'embers'	See Romanian phonology
Scottish Gaelic	Barra	uair	[uəʒ]	'hour'	Dialectal allophone of /ɾʲ/, now primarily heard among older speakers in the south of the island and Vatersay.
Serbo-Croatian		жут / žut	[ʒûːt̪]	'yellow'	May be laminal retroflex instead, depending on the dialect. See Serbo-Croatian phonology
Silesian	Gmina Istebna				These dialects merge /ʐ/ and /ʑ/ into [ʒ].
Silesian	Jablunkov				These dialects merge /ʐ/ and /ʑ/ into [ʒ].
Sioux	Lakota	waŋži	[wãˈʒi]	'one'	
Slovak		žena	[ʒena]	'woman'	See Slovak phonology
Slovene		žito	[ˈʒìːt̪ɔ́]	'cereal'	See Slovene phonology
Spanish	Rioplatense	yo	[ʒo̞]	'I'	Most dialects. See Spanish phonology and yeísmo
Spanish	Ecuadorian Andean	ellos	[eʒos]	'they'	See Spanish phonology and yeísmo
Tadaksahak		[ˈʒɐwɐb]		'to answer'	
Tagish		[ʒé]		'what'	
Turkish		jale	[ʒɑːˈʎ̟ɛ]	'dew'	Only occurs in loanwords. See Turkish phonology
Turkmen		žiraf / ژراف	[ʒiraf]	'giraffe'	Only occurs in loanwords.
Tutchone	Northern	zhi	[ʒi]	'what'	
Tutchone	Southern	zhǜr	[ʒɨ̂r]	'berry'	
Ukrainian		жaбa/žaba	[ˈʒɑbɐ]	'frog'	See Ukrainian phonology
Veps		vīž	[viːʒ]	'five'	
Welayta		[aʒa]		'bush'	
West Frisian		bagaazje	[bɑˈɡaʒə]	'luggage'	See West Frisian phonology
Yiddish		אָראַנזש/oranž	[ɔʀanʒ]	'orange'	See Yiddish phonology
Zapotec	Tilquiapan	llan	[ʒaŋ]	'anger'	

The sound in Russian denoted by ⟨ж⟩ is commonly transcribed as a palato-alveolar fricative but is actually a laminal retroflex fricative.

In English, the phoneme [ʒ] is often found as a hyperforeign substitute for [dʒ] in certain borrowings, Beijing (Mandarin Chinese [tɕ], a voiceless [dʒ]), raj, Taj Mahal, and sometimes even parmesan (French [paʁməzɑ̃]; Italian [parmiˈdʒaːno]).

== Voiced postalveolar non-sibilant fricative ==
Voiced postalveolar non-sibilant fricative

ɹ̠˔

ɹ̝᫢
- IPA number: 151 414 429

Audio sample
- source · help

Encoding
- X-SAMPA: r\_-_r

A voiced postalveolar non-sibilant fricative is a consonantal sound. As the International Phonetic Alphabet does not have separate symbols for the post-alveolar consonants (the same symbol is used for all coronal places of articulation that are not palatalized), this sound is usually transcribed ⟨ɹ̠˔⟩ (retracted constricted [ɹ]).

=== Features ===
- Its manner of articulation is fricative, which means it is produced by constricting air flow through a narrow channel at the place of articulation, causing turbulence. However, it does not have the grooved tongue and directed airflow, or the high frequencies, of a sibilant.
- Its place of articulation is postalveolar, which means it is articulated with either the tip or the blade of the tongue behind the alveolar ridge.
- Its phonation is voiced, which means the vocal cords vibrate during the articulation.
- It is an oral consonant, which means that air is not allowed to escape through the nose.
- It is a median consonant, which means it is produced by directing the airstream down the midline of the tongue, rather than to the sides.
- Its airstream mechanism is pulmonic, which means it is articulated by pushing air only with the intercostal muscles and abdominal muscles, as in most speech sounds.

=== Occurrence ===
Language	Word	IPA	Meaning	Notes
Dutch	meer	[meːɹ̠˔]	'lake'	A rare post-vocalic allophone of /r/. Realization of /r/ varies considerably among dialects. See Dutch phonology.
Manx	mooar	[muːɹ̠˔]	'big'	Pre-consonantal and word-final realization of /r/, in free variation with other allophones.

== See also ==
- Ezh
- Voiceless postalveolar fricative
- Index of phonetics articles
- Voiceless retroflex fricative

== Notes ==
Place →	Labial					Coronal										Dorsal					Laryngeal			
Manner ↓	Bilabial		Labiodental		Linguolabial		Dental		Alveolar		Postalveolar		Retroflex		(Alveolo-)palatal		Velar		Uvular		Pharyngeal/epiglottal		Glottal	
Nasal	m̥	m	ɱ̊	ɱ		n̼	n̪̊	n̪	n̥	n	n̠̊	n̠	ɳ̊	ɳ	ɲ̊	ɲ	ŋ̊	ŋ	ɴ̥	ɴ				
Plosive	p	b	p̪	b̪	t̼	d̼	t̪	d̪	t	d			ʈ	ɖ	c	ɟ	k	ɡ	q	ɢ	ʡ		ʔ	
Sibilant affricate							t̪s̪	d̪z̪	ts	dz	t̠ʃ	d̠ʒ	tʂ	dʐ	tɕ	dʑ								
Non-sibilant affricate	pɸ	bβ	p̪f	b̪v			t̪θ	d̪ð	tɹ̝̊	dɹ̝	t̠ɹ̠̊˔	d̠ɹ̠˔			cç	ɟʝ	kx	ɡɣ	qχ	ɢʁ	ʡʜ	ʡʢ	ʔh	
Sibilant fricative							s̪	z̪	s	z	ʃ	ʒ	ʂ	ʐ	ɕ	ʑ								
Non-sibilant fricative	ɸ	β	f	v	θ̼	ð̼	θ	ð	θ̠	ð̠	ɹ̠̊˔	ɹ̠˔	ɻ̊˔	ɻ˔	ç	ʝ	x	ɣ	χ	ʁ	ħ	ʕ	h	ɦ
Approximant		β̞		ʋ				ð̞		ɹ		ɹ̠		ɻ		j		ɰ						˷
Tap/flap		ⱱ̟		ⱱ					ɾ̥	ɾ			ɽ̊	ɽ						ɢ̆		ʡ̆		
Trill	ʙ̥	ʙ							r̥	r		r̠	ɽ̊r̥	ɽr					ʀ̥	ʀ	ʜ	ʢ		
Lateral affricate									tɬ	dɮ			tꞎ	d𝼅	c𝼆	ɟʎ̝	k𝼄	ɡʟ̝						
Lateral fricative							ɬ̪		ɬ	ɮ			ꞎ	𝼅	𝼆	ʎ̝	𝼄	ʟ̝						
Lateral approximant								l̪	l̥	l		l̠	ɭ̊	ɭ	ʎ̥	ʎ	ʟ̥	ʟ		ʟ̠				
Lateral tap/flap									ɺ̥	ɺ			𝼈̊	𝼈		ʎ̆		ʟ̆						

		BL	LD	D	A	PA	RF	P	V	U
Implosive	Voiced	ɓ			ɗ		ᶑ	ʄ	ɠ	ʛ
Implosive	Voiceless	ɓ̥			ɗ̥		ᶑ̊	ʄ̊	ɠ̊	ʛ̥
Ejective	Stop	pʼ			tʼ		ʈʼ	cʼ	kʼ	qʼ
Ejective	Affricate		p̪fʼ	tθʼ	tsʼ	tʃʼ	tʂʼ	tɕʼ	kxʼ	qχʼ
Ejective	Fricative	ɸʼ	fʼ	θʼ	sʼ	ʃʼ	ʂʼ	ɕʼ	xʼ	χʼ
Ejective	Lateral affricate				tɬʼ			c𝼆ʼ	k𝼄ʼ	q𝼄ʼ
Ejective	Lateral fricative				ɬʼ					
Click (top: velar; bottom: uvular)	Tenuis	kʘ qʘ		kǀ qǀ	kǃ qǃ		k𝼊 q𝼊	kǂ qǂ		
Click (top: velar; bottom: uvular)	Voiced	ɡʘ ɢʘ		ɡǀ ɢǀ	ɡǃ ɢǃ		ɡ𝼊 ɢ𝼊	ɡǂ ɢǂ		
Click (top: velar; bottom: uvular)	Nasal	ŋʘ ɴʘ		ŋǀ ɴǀ	ŋǃ ɴǃ		ŋ𝼊 ɴ𝼊	ŋǂ ɴǂ	ʞ	
Click (top: velar; bottom: uvular)	Tenuis lateral				kǁ qǁ					
Click (top: velar; bottom: uvular)	Voiced lateral				ɡǁ ɢǁ					
Click (top: velar; bottom: uvular)	Nasal lateral				ŋǁ ɴǁ					
