= Romanian phonology =

Sounds and pronunciation of the Romanian language

The Romanian language has a phoneme inventory of seven vowels, two or four semivowels (disputed), and twenty consonants. Other phonemes are found in interjections or recent borrowings.

Romanian includes the two unusual diphthongs /e̯a/ and /o̯a/ and the central vowel /ɨ/.

== Vowels ==
Romanian vowel chart, from Sarlin (2014:18). The non-native vowels /y, ø, ɵ/ are not shown.

There are seven monophthongs:

	Front	Central	Back
Close	i ⟨i⟩	ɨ ⟨î/â⟩ (Note: ⟨î⟩ and ⟨â⟩ represent the same sound, /ɨ/; ⟨î⟩ is used at the beginning and end of words, while ⟨â⟩ is used everywhere else. ⟨î⟩ is retained when adding prefixes: înțeles → neînțeles.)	u ⟨u⟩
Mid	e ⟨e⟩	ə ⟨ă⟩	o ⟨o⟩
Open		a ⟨a⟩	

The table below gives examples for each vowel.

Vowel	Description	Examples
/a/	Open central unrounded	apă /ˈapə/ ('water') balaur /baˈla.ur/ ('dragon') cânta /kɨnˈta/ ('to sing')
/e/	Mid front unrounded	erou /eˈrow/ ('hero') necaz /neˈkaz/ ('trouble') umple /ˈumple/ ('to fill')
/i/	Close front unrounded	insulă /ˈinsulə/ ('island') salcie /ˈsalt͡ʃi.e/ ('willow') topi /toˈpi/ ('to melt')
/o/	Mid back rounded	oraș /oˈraʃ/ ('city') copil /koˈpil/ ('child') acolo /aˈkolo/ ('there')
/u/	Close back rounded	uda /uˈda/ ('to wet') aduc /aˈduk/ ('I bring') simplu /ˈsimplu/ ('simple')
/ə/	Mid central unrounded	ăsta /ˈəsta/ ('this') păros /pəˈros/ ('hairy') albă /ˈalbə/ ('white [fem. sg.]')
/ɨ/	Close central unrounded	înspre /ˈɨnspre/ ('toward') cârnat /kɨrˈnat/ ('sausage') coborî /koboˈrɨ/ ('to descend')

Although most of these vowels are relatively straightforward and similar or identical to those in many other languages, the close central unrounded vowel /ɨ/ is uncommon as a phoneme and especially uncommon amongst Indo-European languages.

According to Sarlin (2014), /ə/ is phonetically open-mid somewhat retracted central [ɜ̠], rather than mid central.

=== Less frequent vowels ===
==== ö ====
In addition to the seven core vowels, in a number of words of foreign origin (predominantly French, but also German) the mid front rounded vowel /ø/ (rounded Romanian /e/; example word: bleu /blø/ 'light blue') and the mid central rounded vowel /ɵ/ (rounded Romanian /ə/; example word: chemin de fer /ʃɵˌmen dɵ ˈfer/ 'Chemin de Fer') have been preserved, without replacing them with any of the existing phonemes. The borrowed words have become part of the Romanian vocabulary and follow the usual inflexion rules, so that the new vowels, though less common, could be considered as part of the Romanian phoneme set. Many Romanian dictionaries use ⟨ö⟩ in their phonetic descriptions to represent both vowels.

Because they are not native phonemes, their pronunciation may fluctuate or they may even be replaced by the diphthong /e̯o/. In older French borrowings it has often been replaced by /e/, /o/, or /e̯o/, as in șofer /ʃoˈfer/ ('driver', from French chauffeur), masor /maˈsor/ ('masseur', from masseur), and sufleor /suˈfle̯or/ ('theater prompter', from souffleur).

==== ü ====
Similarly, borrowings from languages such as French and German sometimes contain the close front rounded vowel /y/: ecru /eˈkry/, tul /tyl/, führer /ˈfyrer/, /ˈfyrər/. The symbol used for it in phonetic notations in Romanian dictionaries is ⟨ü⟩. Educated speakers usually pronounce it /y/, but other realizations such as /ju/ also occur. Older words that originally had this sound have had it replaced with /ju/, /u/, or /i/. For instance, Turkish kül became ghiul /ɡjul/ ('large ring'), Turkish tütün became tutun /tuˈtun/ ('tobacco'), but tiutiun [tjuˈtjun] in the Moldavian dialect, German Düse gave duză /ˈduzə/ ('nozzle') and French bureau became birou /biˈrow/ ('desk', 'office').

=== Diphthongs and triphthongs ===
According to Ioana Chițoran, Romanian has two diphthongs: /e̯a/ and /o̯a/. As a result of their origin (diphthongization of mid vowels under stress), they appear normally in stressed syllables and make morphological alternations with the mid vowels /e/ and /o/.

In addition to these, the semivowels /w/ and /j/ can be combined (either before, after, or both) with most vowels. One view considers that only /e̯a/ and /o̯a/ can follow an obstruent-liquid cluster such as in broască ('frog') and dreagă ('to mend') and form real diphthongs, whereas the rest are merely vowel–glide sequences. The traditional view (taught in schools) considers all of the above as diphthongs.

Falling
Diphthong	Examples
/aj/	mai /maj/ ('May'), aisberg /ˈajsberɡ/ ('iceberg')
/aw/	sau /saw/ ('or'), august /ˈawɡust/ ('August')
/ej/	lei /lej/ ('lions'), trei /trej/ ('three')
/ew/	greu /ɡrew/ ('heavy'), mereu /meˈrew/ ('always')
/ij/	mii /mij/ ('thousands'), vii /vij/ ('you come')
/iw/	fiu /fiw/ ('son'), scriu /skriw/ ('I write')
/oj/	oi /oj/ ('sheep [pl.]'), noi /noj/ ('we')
/ow/	ou /ow/ ('egg'), bou /bow/ ('ox')
/uj/	pui /puj/ ('you put'), gălbui /ɡəlˈbuj/ ('yellowish')
/uw/	continuu /konˈtinuw/ ('continuous')
/əj/	răi /rəj/ ('bad [masc. pl.]'), văi /vəj/ ('valleys')
/əw/	dulău /duˈləw/ ('mastiff'), rău /rəw/ ('bad [masc. sg.]')
/ɨj/	câine /ˈkɨjne/ ('dog'), mâinile /ˈmɨjnile/ ('the hands')
/ɨw/	râu /rɨw/ ('river'), brâu /brɨw/ ('girdle')
Rising
Diphthong	Examples
/e̯a/	beată /ˈbe̯atə/ ('drunk [fem.]'), mea /me̯a/ ('my [fem. sg.]')
/e̯o/	Gheorghe /ˈɡe̯orɡe/ ('George'), ne-o ploua /ne̯oploˈwa/ ('it would rain on us'), vreo /vre̯o/ ('some; around [fem., masc. pl.]')
/e̯u/	(mostly in word combinations) pe-un /pe̯un/ ('on a'), vreun /vre̯un/ ('some; around [masc. sg.]')
/ja/	biată /ˈbjatə/ ('poor [f.]'), mi-a zis /mjaˈzis/ ('[he] told me')
/je/	fier /fjer/ ('iron'), miere /ˈmjere/ ('honey')
/jo/	iod /jod/ ('iodine'), chior /ˈkjor/ ('one-eyed')
/ju/	iubit /juˈbit/ ('loved'), chiuvetă /kjuˈvetə/ ('sink')
/o̯a/	găoace /ɡəˈo̯at͡ʃe/ ('shell'), foarte /ˈfo̯arte/ ('very')
/we/	piuez /piˈwez/ ('I felt [a fabric]'), înșeuez /ɨnʃeˈwez/ ('I saddle')
/wa/	băcăuan /bəkəˈwan/ ('inhabitant of Bacău'), ziua /ˈziwa/ ('the day')
/wə/	două /ˈdowə/ ('two [fem.]'), plouă /ˈplowə/ ('it rains')
/wɨ/	plouând /ploˈwɨnd/ ('raining'), ouând /oˈwɨnd/ ('laying [eggs]')

Triphthong	Examples
/e̯aj/	socoteai /sokoˈte̯aj/ ('you were reckoning')
/e̯aw/	beau /be̯aw/ ('I drink'), spuneau /spuˈne̯aw/ ('they were saying')
/e̯o̯a/	pleoapă /ˈple̯o̯apə/ ('eyelid'), leoarcă /ˈle̯o̯arkə/ ('soaking wet')
/jaj/	mi-ai dat /mjajˈdat/ ('you gave me'), ia-i /jaj/ ('take them')
/jaw/	iau /jaw/ ('I take'), suiau /suˈjaw/ ('they were climbing')
/jej/	iei /jej/ ('you take'), piei /pjej/ ('skins')
/jew/	eu /jew/ ('I [myself]')
/joj/	i-oi da /jojˈda/ ('I might give him'), picioică /piˈt͡ʃjoj.kə/ ('potato [regionalism]')
/jow/	maiou /maˈjow/ ('undershirt')
/o̯aj/	leoaică /leˈo̯ajkə/ ('lioness'), rusoaică /ruˈso̯ajkə/ ('Russian woman')
/waj/	înșeuai /ɨnʃeˈwaj/ ('[you] were saddling')
/waw/	înșeuau /ɨnʃeˈwaw/ ('[they] were saddling')
/wəj/	rouăi /ˈrowəj/ ('of the dew')
/jo̯a/	creioane /kreˈjo̯ane/ ('pencils'), aripioară /ariˈpjo̯arə/ ('winglet')

As can be seen from the examples above, the diphthongs /e̯a/ and /o̯a/ contrast with /ja/ and /wa/ respectively, though there are no minimal pairs to contrast /o̯a/ and /wa/. Impressionistically, the two pairs sound very similar to native speakers. Because /o̯a/ does not appear in the final syllable of a prosodic word, there are no monosyllabic words with /o̯a/; exceptions might include voal ('veil') and doar ('only, just'), though Ioana Chițoran argues that these are best treated as containing glide-vowel sequences rather than diphthongs. In some regional pronunciations, the diphthong /o̯a/ tends to be pronounced as a single vowel /ɒ/.

Other triphthongs such as /juj/ and /o̯aw/ occur sporadically in interjections and uncommon words.

==== Diphthongs in borrowings ====
Borrowings from English have enlarged the set of ascending diphthongs to also include /jə/, /we/, /wi/, and /wo/, or have extended their previously limited use. Generally, these borrowings have retained their original spellings, but their pronunciation has been adapted to Romanian phonology. The table below gives some examples.

Diphthong	Examples
/jə/	yearling /ˈjərlinɡ/ 'one-year-old animal (colt)'
/we/	western /ˈwestern/ 'Western (movie set in the American West)'
/wi/	tweeter /ˈtwitər/ 'high-pitch loudspeaker'
/wo/	walkman /ˈwokmen/ 'pocket-sized tape/CD player'

Borrowings such as whisky and week-end are listed in some dictionaries as starting with the ascending diphthong /wi/, which corresponds to the original English pronunciation, but in others they appear with the descending diphthong /uj/.

=== Vowel alternations ===
Romanian has vowel alternation or apophony triggered by stress. A stressed syllable has an open vowel, or a diphthong ending in an open vowel, and an unstressed syllable has a mid vowel. Thus /e̯a/ alternates with /e/, /o̯a/ with /o/, and /a/ with /ə/.

This alternation developed from Romanian vowel breaking (diphthongization) and reduction (weakening). The Eastern Romance mid vowels /e o/ were broken in stressed syllables, giving the Romanian diphthongs /e̯a o̯a/, and the open vowel /a/ was reduced in unstressed syllables, giving the Romanian central vowel /ə/.

These sound changes created the stress-triggered vowel alternations in the table below. Here stressed syllables are marked with underlining (a):

	Stressed		Unstressed		IPA and recording
a — ə	carte	'book'	cărticică	'book' (diminutive)	/ˈkarte, kərtiˈt͡ʃikə/
a — ə	casă	'house'	căsuță	'house' (diminutive)	/ˈkasə, kəˈsut͡sə/
e̯a — e	beat	'drunk'	bețiv	'drunkard'	/be̯at, beˈt͡siv/
e̯a — e	seară	'evening'	înserat	'dusk'	/ˈse̯arə, ɨnseˈrat/
o̯a — o	poartă	'gate'	portar	'gatekeeper'	/ˈpo̯artə, porˈtar/
o̯a — o	coastă	'rib'	costiță	'rib' (diminutive)	/ˈko̯astə, kosˈtit͡sə/

This has since been morphologized and now shows up in verb conjugations and nominal inflection: oaste — oști, 'army' — 'armies'.

== Consonants ==
Standard Romanian has twenty consonant phonemes, as listed in the table below.

Romanian consonants
		Labial	Dental/Alveolar (Note: /t t͡s d s z/ are apico-dental. /n l r/ are apico-alveolar.)		Palatal (-alveolar)	Velar	Glottal
		Labial	plain	sibilant	Palatal (-alveolar)	Velar	Glottal
Nasal		m ⟨m⟩	n ⟨n⟩				
Plosive/ Affricate	voiceless	p ⟨p⟩	t ⟨t⟩	t͡s ⟨ț⟩	t͡ʃ ⟨c⟩ (Note: ⟨c⟩+⟨a/ă/â/î/o/u⟩ means ⟨c⟩ is pronounced as /k/. ⟨c⟩+⟨e/i⟩ means ⟨c⟩ is pronounced as /t͡ʃ/. ⟨ch⟩+⟨e/i⟩ means ⟨ch⟩ is pronounced as /k/. ⟨k⟩ is used in loan words.)	k ⟨c/ch/k⟩	
Plosive/ Affricate	voiced	b ⟨b⟩	d ⟨d⟩		d͡ʒ ⟨g⟩ (Note: ⟨g⟩+⟨a/ă/â/î/o/u⟩ means ⟨g⟩ is pronounced as /ɡ/. ⟨g⟩+⟨e/i⟩ means ⟨g⟩ is pronounced as /d͡ʒ/. ⟨gh⟩+⟨e/i⟩ means ⟨gh⟩ is pronounced as /ɡ/.)	ɡ ⟨g/gh⟩	
Fricative	voiceless	f ⟨f⟩		s ⟨s⟩	ʃ ⟨ș⟩		h ⟨h⟩
Fricative	voiced	v ⟨v⟩		z ⟨z⟩	ʒ ⟨j⟩		
Approximant			l ⟨l⟩		j ⟨i⟩	w ⟨u⟩	
Trill			r ⟨r⟩				

Besides the consonants in this table, a few consonants can have allophones:

- Palatalized consonants occur when preceding an underlying word-final /i/, which is then deleted.
- /n/ becomes the velar [ŋ] before /k/, /ɡ/ and /h/;
- /h/ becomes the velar [x] in word-final positions (duh 'spirit') and before consonants (hrean 'horseradish'); it becomes the palatal [ç] before [i], [j], like in the word human in English, and as a realization for an underlying /hi/ sequence in word-final positions (cehi 'Czech people' is pronounced [t͡ʃeç], though usually transcribed [t͡ʃehʲ]).

The consonant inventory of Romanian is similar to Italian. Romanian, however, lacks the palatal consonants /ɲ ʎ/, which merged with /j/ by lenition (though /ɲ/ is retained in the Banatian regionalism), and the affricate /d͡z/ changed to /z/ by spirantization (regionally retained in the Banatian and Moldovan regionalisms). Romanian has the fricative /ʒ/ and the glottal fricative /h/, which do not occur in Italian.

=== Palatalized consonants ===
Palatalized consonants appear mainly at the end of words, and mark two grammatical categories: plural nouns and adjectives, and second person singular verbs.

The interpretation commonly taken is that an underlying morpheme /i/ palatalizes the consonant and is subsequently deleted. However, /sʲ/, /tʲ/, and /dʲ/ become [ʃʲ], [t͡sʲ], and [zʲ], respectively, with very few phonetically justified exceptions, included in the table below, which shows that this palatalization can occur for all consonants.

Voiceless		Voiced	
Consonant	Examples	Consonant	Examples
/pʲ/	rupi /rupʲ/ 'you tear'	/bʲ/	arabi /aˈrabʲ/ 'Arabs'
/tʲ/	proști /proʃtʲ/ 'stupid (masc. pl.)'	/dʲ/	nădejdi /nəˈdeʒdʲ/ 'hopes'
/kʲ/	urechi /uˈrekʲ/ 'ears'; ochi /okʲ/ 'eye(s)'	/ɡʲ/	unghi /unɡʲ/ 'angle'
/t͡sʲ/	roți /rot͡sʲ/ 'wheels'	–	
/t͡ʃʲ/	faci /fat͡ʃʲ/ 'you do'	/d͡ʒʲ/	mergi /merd͡ʒʲ/ 'you go'
–		/mʲ/	dormi /dormʲ/ 'you sleep'
–		/nʲ/	bani /banʲ/ 'money (pl.)'
/fʲ/	șefi /ʃefʲ/ 'bosses'	/vʲ/	pleșuvi /pleˈʃuvʲ/ 'bald (masc. pl.)'
/sʲ/	bessi /besʲ/ 'Bessi'	/zʲ/	brazi /brazʲ/ 'fir trees'
/ʃʲ/	moși /moʃʲ/ 'old men'	/ʒʲ/	breji /breʒʲ/ 'brave (masc. pl.)'
/hʲ/	vlahi /vlahʲ/ 'Wallachians'	–	
–		/lʲ/	școli /ʃkolʲ/ 'schools'
–		/rʲ/	sari /sarʲ/ 'you jump'

In certain morphological processes /ʲ/ is replaced by the full vowel /i/, for example

- in noun plural genitive formation: școli — școlilor /ʃkolʲ/ — /ˈʃkolilor/ ('schools — of the schools'),
- when appending the definite article to some plural nouns: brazi — brazii /brazʲ/ — /ˈbra.zij/ ('fir trees — the fir trees')
- in verb + pronoun combinations: dați — dați-ne /dat͡sʲ/ — /ˈdat͡sine/ ('give — give us').

This may explain why /ʲ/ is perceived as a separate sound by native speakers and written with the same letter as the vowel /i/.

The non-syllabic /ʲ/ can be sometimes found inside compound words like câțiva /kɨt͡sʲˈva/ ('a few') and oricare /orʲˈkare/ ('whichever'), where the first morpheme happened to end in this /ʲ/. A word that contains this twice is cincizeci /t͡ʃint͡ʃʲˈzet͡ʃʲ/ ('fifty').

In Old Romanian and still in some local pronunciations there is another example of such a non-syllabic, non-semivocalic phoneme, derived from /u/, which manifests itself as labialization of the preceding sound. The usual IPA notation is /ʷ/. It is found at the end of some words after consonants and semivowels, as in un urs, pronounced /un ˈursʷ/ ('a bear'), or îmi spui /ɨmʲ spujʷ/ ('you tell me'). The disappearance of this phoneme might be attributed to the fact that, unlike /ʲ/, it did not play any morphological role. It is a trace of Latin endings containing /u(ː)/, /oː/ (-us, -ūs, -um, -ō), this phoneme is related to vowel /u/ used to connect the definite article "l" to the stem of a noun or adjective, as in domn — domnul /domn/ — /ˈdomnul/ ('lord — the lord', cf. Latin dominus).

=== Other consonants ===
As with other languages, Romanian interjections often use sounds beyond the normal phoneme inventory or disobey the normal phonotactical rules, by containing unusual phoneme sequences, by allowing words to be made up of only consonants, or by consisting of repetitions. Such exceptional mechanisms are needed to obtain an increased level of expressivity. Often, these interjections have multiple spellings or occasionally none at all, which accounts for the difficulty of finding the right approximation using existing letters. The following is a list of examples.

- A bilabial click [ʘ], pronounced by rounding the lips and strongly sucking air between them, is used for urging horses to start walking.
- Whistling is another interjection surpassing the limits of the phoneme inventory. It is usually spelled fiu-fiu.
- The dental click [ǀ] (see also click consonants) is used in an interjection similar to the English tut-tut (or tsk-tsk), expressing concern, disappointment, disapproval, etc., and generally accompanied by frowning or a comparable facial expression. Usually two to four such clicks in a row make up the interjection; only one click is rare and more than four can be used for over-emphasis. The Romanian spelling is usually tț, ttt or țțț.
- The same dental click is used in another interjection, the informal equivalent of "no" (nu in Romanian). Only one click is emitted, usually as an answer to a yes–no question. Although there is rarely any accompanying sound, the usual spelling is nt or nț.
- A series of interjections are pronounced with the mouth shut. Depending on intonation, length, and rhythm, they can have various meanings, such as: perplexity, doubt, displeasure, tastiness, toothache, approval, etc. Possible spellings include: hm, hâm/hîm, mhm, îhî, mmm, îî, hî. Phonetically similar, but semantically different, is the English interjection ahem.
- Another interjection, meaning "no", is pronounced [ˈʔḿ ʔm̀] (with a high-low phonetic pitch). Possible spellings include: î-î, îm-îm, and m-m. The stress pattern is opposite to the interjection for "yes" mentioned before, pronounced [m̀ˈḿ̥m] (with a low-high phonetic pitch).
- Pfu expresses contempt or dissatisfaction and starts with the voiceless bilabial fricative /ɸ/, sounding like (but being different from) the English whew, which expresses relief after an effort or danger.
- Câh/cîh expresses disgust and ends in the voiceless velar fricative /x/, similar in meaning to English ugh.
- Brrr expresses shivering cold and is made up of a single consonant, the bilabial trill, whose IPA symbol is /ʙ/

== Stress ==
Romanian has a stress accent, like almost all other Romance languages (with the notable exception of French). Generally, stress falls on the last syllable of a stem (that is, the root and derivational affixes but excluding inflections). Although a lexically marked stress pattern with penultimate stress exists, morphologically derived forms continue to follow the unmarked pattern.

fráte /ˈfrate/ ('brother'), copíl /koˈpil/ ('child')
strúgure /ˈstruɡure/ ('grape'), albástru /alˈbastru/ ('blue'), călătór /kələˈtor/ ('voyager').

Stress is not normally marked in writing, except occasionally to distinguish between homographs, or in dictionaries for the headwords. When it is marked, the main vowel of the stressed syllable receives an accent (usually acute, but sometimes grave), for example véselă 'jovial (fem. sing.)' vs. vesélă 'tableware'.

In verb conjugation, noun declension, and other word formation processes, stress shifts can occur. Verbs can have homographic forms only distinguished by stress, such as in el suflă which can mean 'he blows' (el súflă) or 'he blew' (el suflắ) depending on whether the stress is on the first or the second syllable. Changing the grammatical category of a word can lead to similar word pairs, such as the verb a albí /alˈbi/ 'to whiten' compared to the adjective álbi /ˈalbʲ/ 'white, masc. pl.'. Stress in Romanian verbs can normally be predicted by comparing tenses with similar verbs in Spanish, which does indicate stress in writing.

Secondary stress occurs according to a predictable pattern, falling on every other syllable, starting with the first, as long as it does not fall adjacent to the primary stress.

== Prosody ==
=== Rhythm ===
Romanian is syllable-timed, along with most Romance languages (but not Portuguese), Telugu, Yoruba, Chinese, Indonesian/Malay and many others. That is, each syllable takes approximately the same time to pronounce. This contrasts with stress-timed languages such as English, Russian, and Arabic, in which syllables are pronounced at a lower or higher rate so as to achieve a roughly equal time interval between stressed syllables, as well as with mora timing, exemplified by Classical Latin, Fijian, Finnish, Hawaiian, Japanese, and Old English.

The distinction between these timing categories may sometimes seem unclear, and definitions vary. In addition, the time intervals between stresses/syllables/morae are only approximately equal, with many exceptions and large deviations. However, whereas the actual time may be only approximately equal, the differences are clear.

In the case of Romanian, consonant clusters are often found both in the syllable onset and coda, which require physical time to be pronounced. The syllable timing rule is then overridden by slowing down the rhythm. Thus, it is seen that stress and syllable timing interact. The sample sentences below, each consisting of six syllables, are illustrative:

Mama pune masa – Mom sets the table
Mulți puști blonzi plâng prin curți – Many blond kids cry in the courtyards

The total time length taken by each of these sentences is obviously different, and attempting to pronounce one of them with the same rhythm as the other results in unnatural utterances.

To a lesser extent, syllables are also lengthened by liquid and nasal consonants, and by semivowels in diphthongs and triphthongs, as in these examples:

Romanian	English
pic — plic	bit — envelope
cec — cerc	cheque — circle
zic — zinc	I say — zinc
car — chiar	I carry — even
sare — soare	salt — sun
sta — stea	to stay — star
fi — fii	be (inf.) — be (imperative)

A simple way to evaluate the length of a word, and compare it to another, consists in pronouncing it repeatedly at a natural speech rate.

=== Intonation ===
Intonation is influenced by many factors: the focus of the sentence, the theme and the rheme, emotional aspects, etc. This section covers a few general traits. Most importantly, intonation is essential in questions since, unlike English and other languages, Romanian does not distinguish grammatically declarative and interrogative sentences.

In non-emphatic yes/no questions the pitch rises at the end of the sentence until the last stressed syllable. If unstressed syllables follow, they often have a falling intonation, but this is not a rule.

— Ai stins lumina? [ai stins lu↗mi↘na] (Have you turned off the light?)

— Da. (Yes.)

In Transylvanian speech these yes/no questions have a very different intonation pattern, usually with a pitch peak at the beginning of the question: [ai ↗stins lumi↘na]

In selection questions the tone rises at the first element of the selection, and falls at the second.

— Vrei bere sau vin? [vrei ↗bere sau ↘vin] (Do you want beer or wine?)

— Bere. (Beer.)

Wh-questions start with a high pitch on the first word and then the pitch falls gradually toward the end of the sentence.

— Cine a lăsat ușa deschisă? [↗cine↘ a lăsat ușa deschisă] (Who left the door open?)

— Mama. (Mom did.)

Repeat questions have a rising intonation.

— A sunat Rodica adineauri. (Rodica just called.)

— Cine a sunat? [cine a su↗nat] (Who called?)

— Colega ta, Rodica. (Your classmate, Rodica.)

Tag questions are uttered with a rising intonation.

— Ți-e foame, nu-i așa? [ți-e foame, nu-i a↗șa] (You're hungry, aren't you?)

Unfinished utterances have a rising intonation similar to that of yes/no questions, but the pitch rise is smaller.

— După ce m-am întors... [după ce m-am în↗tors...] (After I came back...)

Various other intonation patterns are used to express: requests, commands, surprise, suggestion, advice, and so on.

== Example text ==
Orthographic: Radu se joacă în curte. El aleargă până la gard, și apoi se-ntoarce spre casă.
Phonetic: [ˈradu se ˈʒo̯akə ɨn ˈkurte jel aˈle̯arɡə ˈpɨnə la ɡard ʃi aˈpoj senˈto̯art͡ʃe spre ˈkasə]

== See also ==
- Romanian language
- Romanian alphabet

== Bibliography ==
- Chițoran, Ioana (2001), The Phonology of Romanian: A Constraint-based Approach, Berlin & New York: Mouton de Gruyter, ISBN 978-3-11-016766-5
- Chițoran, Ioana (2002a), "A perception-production study of Romanian diphthongs and glide-vowel sequences", Journal of the International Phonetic Association, 32 (2): 203–222, doi:10.1017/S0025100302001044, S2CID 10104718
- Chițoran, Ioana (2002b), "The phonology and morphology of Romanian diphthongization" (PDF), Probus, 14 (2): 205–246, doi:10.1515/prbs.2002.009
- Croitor Balaciu, Blanca (2006), "Interjecția", in Academia Română Institutul de Lingvistică "Iorgu Iordan - Alexandru Rosetti" (ed.), Gramatica limbii române (in Romanian), vol. I Cuvântul, Bucharest: Editura Academiei Române, pp. 657–687
- Petrovici, Emil (1956), Influența slavă asupra sistemului fonemelor limbii romîne [The Slavic influence on the phoneme system of the Romanian language], Bucharest: Societatea de științe istorice și filologice
- Pop, Sever (1938), Micul Atlas Linguistic Român, Muzeul Limbii Române Cluj
- Sarlin, Mika (2014) [First published 2013], "Sounds of Romanian and their spelling", Romanian Grammar (2nd ed.), Helsinki: Books on Demand GmbH, ISBN 978-952-286-898-5
- Schane, Sanford A. (1971), "The phoneme revisited", Language, 3 (47): 503–521, doi:10.2307/412375, JSTOR 412375
- Vasiliu, Emanuel (1965), Fonologia limbii române, Editura Științifică, București
