= Corsican alphabet =

Alphabet of the Corsican language

The modern Corsican alphabet (Corsican: u santacroce or u salteriu) uses twenty-two basic letters taken from the Latin alphabet with some changes, plus some multigraphs. The pronunciations of the English, French, Italian or Latin forms of these letters are not a guide to their pronunciation in Corsican, which has its own pronunciation, often the same, but frequently not. As can be seen from the table below, two of the phonemic letters are represented as trigraphs, plus some other digraphs. Nearly all the letters are allophonic; that is, a phoneme of the language might have more than one pronunciation and be represented by more than one letter. The exact pronunciation depends mainly on word order and usage and is governed by a complex set of rules, variable to some degree by dialect. These have to be learned by the speaker of the language.

== Modern alphabet ==
Order
1	2	3	4	5	6	7	8	9	10	11	12	13	14	15	16	17	18	19	20	21	22	23	24	25	26
Majuscule Forms (also called uppercase or capital letters)
A	B	C	CHJ	D	E	F	G	GHJ	H	I	J	L	M	N	O	P	Q	R	S	SC	SG	T	U	V	Z
Minuscule Forms (also called lowercase or small letters)
a	b	c	chj	d	e	f	g	ghj	h	i	j	l	m	n	o	p	q	r	s	sc	sg	t	u	v	z
Names
à	bì	cì	chjì	dè	è	effe	gì	ghjè	acca	ì	jì	elle	emme	enne	ò	pè	cù	erre	esse	esci	esge	tì	ù	vè	zeda
IPA transcription of names
[ˈa]	[ˈbi]	[ˈtʃi]	[ˈci]	[ˈdɛ]	[ˈɛ]	[ˈɛffɛ]	[ˈdʒɛ]	[ˈɟɛ]	[ˈakka]	[ˈi]	[ˈji]	[ˈɛllɛ]	[ˈɛmmɛ]	[ˈɛnnɛ]	[ˈo]	[ˈpɛ]	[ˈku]	[ˈɛrrɛ]	[ˈɛssɛ]	[ˈɛʃi]	[ˈɛʒɛ]	[ˈti]	[ˈu]	[ˈvɛ]	[ˈdzɛda]

Notes:

- Unlike French, there are no mute letters (and notably no mute e, even if an unstressed letter E/e may be pronounced like a schwa or mutated into another unstressed vowel);
- the letter H/h only occurs after another consonant to form digrams or trigrams : CH/ch, CHJ/chj, DH/dh (rare for Southern dialects), GH/gh, GHJ/ghj or alone to differentiate two homophones. Example: è "and" and hè "is";
- the letter J/j may be found in older transcriptions (before the adoption of a stable orthography), where today it is preferably written with the digram SG/sg; otherwise it only occurs in trigrams : CHJ/chj or GHJ/ghj;
- the letter Q/q only occurs in the consonantal digram QU/qu;
- the letters K/k (cappa [ˈkappa]), W/w (vè dòppio [ˈvɛ ˈdɔppio]), X/x (iquèsi [iˈkɛzi]), Y/y (i grècu [ˈi ˈɡɾɛku]) are not used;
- for collation purpose, the digraphs and trigraphs are split into their component letters.

Basic diacritics:

The Corsican language is stressed on varying syllables, even if most often the stress occurs on the penultimate syllable (monosyllabic words are most often stressed, but may be unstressed in a few cases). As the position of the stress is distinctive in many terms, the stress needs to be distinguished. The grave accent is then written above the vowel of the stressed syllable, if it is not the penultimate one. The stress is also marked on monosyllabic words.

The following letters can then occur in standard Corsican orthographies:

À/à, È/è, Ì/ì, Ò/ò, Ù/ù.

In addition, Corsican includes vocalic diphthongs that count as a single syllable. If that syllable is stressed, the first vowel is softened or reduced, and the second vowel holds the stress mark which must be written (IÀ/ià, IÈ/iè, IÒ/iò, IÙ/iù).

However, in other unstressed syllables, the default orthography considers vowel pairs as unstressed diphthongs counting for a single syllable (IA/ia, IE/i.e., IO/io, IU/iu); if the two vowels need to be separated, and none of them are stressed, a diaeresis mark may sometimes be used on the first vowel (ÏA/ïa, ÏE/ïe, ÏO/ïo, ÏU/ïu). This case is not always followed, except for academic purpose to exhibit the absence of diphthong and the syllabic break: most writers don't use it. The diaeresis is also not needed in the more common case, where the vowel pair is stressed on the leading I/i without a diphthong, as the stress mark already marks the diaeresis (ÌA/ìa, ÌE/ìe, IÒ/iò, IÙ/iù). But when this vowel pair is final, the stress mark on the first vowel is most frequently not written (except for academic purpose) because such diphthongs normally do not occur on the final position. For example, zìu (uncle) [ˈtsi.u] is most often written just as ziu; similarly with Bastìa [basˈti.a], most often written just as Bastia (even though it is not pronounced [ˈbas.tja]).

Also, the vowel U/u is also used in digraphs to form complex consonants CU/cu, GU/gu, QU/qu, before one of the vowels A/a, E/e, I/i, O/o (which may be stressed or not). If the letter U/u must still be separated to avoid the digraph of the complex consonant, a diaeresis will be used above U/u to separate the syllables. This case occurs in CÜ/cü or GÜ/gü when those syllables are not stressed. If one of those syllables are stressed, it takes the normal grave accent, and the vowel after it is written normally without needing any diaeresis.

Unlike Italian (where nasalized vowels have disappeared), the nasalization of vowels E/e, I/i, O/o can occur frequently in Corsican, on stressed or unstressed syllables before N/n. As this nasalization is normally mandatory, and does not mute the letter N/n (unlike French), no diacritic is needed; in more rare cases where the vowel must not be nasalized, the letter N/n is doubled.

The basic alphabet for standard Corsican in modern orthography is then:

A a (À à), B b, C c, D d, E e (È è), F f, G g, H h, I i (Ì ì, Ï ï), J j, L l, M m, N n, O o (Ò ò), P p, Q q, R r, S s, T t, U u (Ù ù, Ü ü), V v, Z z.

All these letters can be typed with the standard French keyboard.

Corsican also needs an orthographic apostrophe to mark the elision, preferably written in its curly form (’) for good typography, even though the vertical ASCII quote (') is common.

== Extended diacritics ==
Corsican also contains phonetic distinctions for the aperture of vowels E/e and O/o, which may be distinctive in some cases.

However, given that the phonetics varies in regional dialectal variants of the language (where the distinction of aperture may also become a mutation of the vowel, notably in the southern dialects), the distinction of aperture is generally not written, even if this creates homographs whose meaning is revealed by the context. Some early Corsican transcriptions however have used the acute accent on É/é for the closed e, however this is not necessary in the modern orthography because a stressed È/è is normally already meant as a close e (IPA: [e]), and an unstressed E/e most often mutates into another vowel, instead of being pronounced as open e (IPA: [ɛ]).

As well, the combination Ô/ô has been found in older transcriptions to mean the close o (IPA: [o]), where it is normally stressed, and it is now preferably written as Ò/ò like other stressed vowels, the absence of diacritic (except on penultimate syllables) generally implying the open o (IPA: [ɔ]).

Finally, Corsican texts may sometimes contain words imported from French (most often proper names for people, or toponyms).

With these common extensions needed for modern Corsican, the extended alphabet is:

A a [Â â] (À à), [Æ æ], B b, C c [Ç ç], D d, E e [É é, Ê ê] (È è) [Ë ë], F f, G g, H h, I i (Ì ì) [Î î, Ï ï], J j, K k, L l, M m, N n, O o [Ô ô] (Ò ò), [Œ œ], P p, Q q, R r, S s, T t, U u (Ù ù) [Ü ü], V v, [W w], [X x], [Y y, Ÿ ÿ], Z z.

Like French, the rare ligatured letters Æ/æ and Œ/œ are treated as a+e and o+e for collation purposes.
