= IPA number =

Numbering system for alphabetical symbols

IPA numbers are a legacy system of coding the symbols of the International Phonetic Alphabet. They were the organizational basis for XSAMPA and the IPA Extensions block of Unicode.

Following the Kiel Convention in 1989, most letters, diacritics and other symbols of the IPA were assigned a 3-digit numerical code, with updates through 2005. The purpose was to identify IPA symbols explicitly in an era of competing computer encodings, and thus to prevent confusion between similar characters (such as ⟨ɵ⟩ and ⟨θ⟩, ⟨ɤ⟩ and ⟨ɣ⟩, ⟨ʃ⟩ and ⟨ʄ⟩, ⟨ɫ⟩ and ⟨ɬ⟩ or ⟨ǁ⟩ and ⟨‖⟩) in such situations as the printing of manuscripts. The system never saw much if any use and is now defunct, having been superseded by Unicode.

The semantic and graphic categories of the symbols are assigned different ranges of numbers: The 100 series are IPA consonants, the 200s retired and non-IPA consonants, the 300s vowels, the 400s diacritics, the 500s suprasegmentals, the 600s extIPA, the 700s capital letters and the 900s delimiters. Some symbols have more than one code.

== 100: IPA consonants ==
Current IPA consonants, and those retired after the Kiel convention, are assigned numbers in the 100 range. The tie-bars used to create affricate consonants are assigned numbers in the 400 and 500 ranges.

Consonants (main chart)
	Bilabial	Labiodental	Alveolar			Retroflex	Palatal	Velar	Uvular	Pharyngeal	Glottal
Plosive	p b 101 102		t d 103 104			ʈ ɖ 105 106	c ɟ 107 108	k ɡ g 109 110 210	q ɢ 111 112	ʡ 173	ʔ 113
Nasal	m 114	ɱ 115	n 116			ɳ 117	ɲ 118	ŋ 119	ɴ 120		
Trill	ʙ 121		r 122						ʀ 123	ʜ ʢ 172 174	
Tap or Flap		ⱱ 184	ɾ 124			ɽ 125					
Fricative	ɸ β 126 127	f v 128 129	θ ð 130 131	s z 132 133	ʃ ʒ 134 135	ʂ ʐ 136 137	ç ʝ 138 139	x ɣ 140 141	χ ʁ 142 143	ħ ʕ 144 145	h ɦ 146 147
Lateral fricative			ɬ ɮ 148 149								
Approximant		ʋ 150	ɹ 151			ɻ 152	j 153	ɰ 154			
Lateral approximant			l 155			ɭ 156	ʎ 157	ʟ 158			

Implosives	Clicks
ƥ ɓ 159 160	ʘ 176
ƭ ɗ 161 162	ǀ 177
ƈ ʄ 163 164	ǃ 178
ƙ ɠ 165 166	ǂ 179
ʠ ʛ 167 168	ǁ 180
Other symbols
ʍ w 169 170	ɧ 175
ɥ 171	ɺ 181
ɕ ʑ 182 183	◌͡◌ ◌͜◌ 433 509

== 200: retired and non-IPA consonants ==
The 200 range is mostly retired IPA consonants, though it includes several letters of the Americanist Phonetic Alphabet that are sometimes used alongside the IPA. A few superscript IPA letters, including a single vowel, have also been assigned numbers in this range. Symbols official until retirement by Kiel in 1989 are numbered upwards from 201; those already retired, or not IPA at all, are numbered downwards from 299.

In addition, there is the pre-composed character ⟨ɫ⟩, the loop-tail ⟨g⟩ (see the main consonant chart above), and the implicit IPA letter ⟨ᶑ⟩.

Old click letters	ʇ 201	ʗ 202	ʖ 203	ʞ 291		
Superscript letters	ˢ 207	ᶿ 217	ᵊ 218	ˣ 292		
Misc.	ɼ 206	ƞ 293	ɫ 209	ᶑ 219	ƻ 290	ƾ NA
Palatalized letters	ʆ 204	ʓ 205	ƫ 208	ᶁ NA	ᶅ NA	ᶇ NA
Ligature affricates	ʦ 211	ʣ 212	ʧ 213	ʤ 214	ʨ 215	ʥ 216
NAPA letters	ƛ 294	λ 295	ž 296	š 297	ǰ 298	č 299

== 300: IPA vowels ==
Vowel letters that were official after Kiel were numbered upward from 301. ⟨ı⟩, which was once needed to create ⟨i⟩ with a diacritic, two letters retired at Kiel, ⟨ɩ ɷ⟩, and the three non-rhotic vowels added in the 1993 and 1996 updates to the IPA, ⟨ɘ ɞ ʚ⟩, were numbered downward from 399. Pre-composed ⟨ɚ⟩, present at Kiel, was assigned a number, but later ⟨a˞⟩ and ⟨ɝ⟩ were not.

Vowels
	Front	Central	Back
Close	i ı y 301 394 309	ɨ ʉ 317 318	ɯ u 316 308
Near-close	ɪ ɩ ʏ 319 399 320		ʊ ɷ 321 398
Mid-close	e ø 302 310	ɘ ɵ 397 323	ɤ o 315 307
Mid		ə ɚ 322 327	
Mid-open	ɛ œ 303 311	ɜ ɝ ɞ ʚ 326 NA 395 396	ʌ ɔ 314 306
Near-open	æ 325	ɐ 324	
Open	a ɶ 304 312		ɑ ɒ 305 313

== 400: non-tone diacritics ==
Diacritics
◌ʼ; 401	◌̥ 402A	◌̊ 402B	◌̬ 403
◌ʰ 404	◌ʱ NA	◌̤ 405	◌̰ 406
◌̼ 407	◌̪ 408	◌̺ 409	◌̻ 410
◌̹ 411	◌̜ 412	◌̟ 413	◌̠ 414
◌̈ 415	◌̽ 416	◌̘ 417	◌̙ 418
◌˞ 419	◌ʷ 420	◌ʲ 421	◌ᶣ NA
◌ˠ 422	◌ˤ 423	◌̃ 424	◌ⁿ 425
◌ˡ 426	◌̚ 427	◌̴ 428	ɫ 209
◌̝ 429	◌̞ 430	◌̩ 431	◌̯ 432
Retired and non-IPA
, 491	◌ʻ; 492	◌̇ 493	◌˹ 490
◌˗ 494	◌˖ 495	◌ʸ 496	◌ʴ NA
◌̢ 489	◌̣ 497	◌̡ 498	◌̫ 499

== 500: suprasegmentals ==
Indicators of tone, stress, intonation and other elements of prosody. Combinations of tone diacritics or letters that were illustrated on the IPA Chart in 1999 are assigned individual numbers, leaving 3 tone diacritics and many, many compound tone letters without assigned numbers.

Prosody
ˈ◌ 501	ˌ◌ 502	◌.◌ 506	◌‿◌ 509
◌ː; 503	◌ˑ; 504	◌̆ 505	◌̑ 595
| 507	‖ 508	↗ 510	↘ 511

Tone and intonation
Level		Contour	
◌̋ 512	˥ 519	◌̌ 524	˩˥ 529
◌́ 513	˦ 520	◌̂ 525	˥˩ 530
◌̄ 514	˧ 521	◌᷄ 526	˧˥ 531
◌̀ 515	˨ 522	◌᷅ 527	˩˧ 532
◌̏ 516	˩ 523	◌᷈ 528	˨˦˨ 533
		◌᷇ NA	˥˧ NA
ꜜ 517		◌᷆ NA	˧˩ NA
ꜛ 518		◌᷉ NA	˦˨˦ NA
Retired and non-IPA
ˇ◌ 596	ˆ◌ 597	◌̖ 598	◌̗ 599

== 600: extIPA ==
The symbols of the Extensions to the IPA were numbered sequentially to 683. Several are redundant with other ranges. (The capital Latin letters are not shown here; see the 700 range.) A few letters that were apparently added to extIPA after 1999, such as ⟨ʬ⟩, were not given numbers either, though they predate ⟨ⱱ⟩, which was added to the regular IPA in 2005 and did receive a number. The symbols added in the 2015 expansion of extIPA were apparently never assigned numbers either.

Letters	ʭ 601	ʩ 602	ʪ 603	ʫ 604	ʬ NA	¡ NA
Letters	◯ 611	* 612	Œ 627	Θ 628	И NA	ꟿ NA
Connected speech	(.); 631	(‥); 632	(...); 633	1; 640	2; 641	3; 643
Connected speech	_{f} 634	_{ff} 635	_{p} 636	_{pp} 637	_{allegro} 638	_{lento} 639
Inline symbols	\ 659	↓ 661	↑ 662	◌‼ 672	◌! 679	

Number 611 is the "balloon" used to encircle unidentified segments.

Misc. diacritics	◌͆ 651	◌͍ 652	◌̪͆ 653	◌͊ 654	◌͋ 655	◌͌ 656	◌͈ 657	◌͉ 658	◌͎ 660
Misc. diacritics	◌ᶹ 673	◌͢◌ 674	◌͇ 675	◌ʶ 676	◌ꟸ 677	◌ꟹ 678	◌˭ 680	◌͔ 681	◌͕ 682
Voicing diacritics	◌̬᪽ 665	◌̬᫃ 666	◌̬᫄ 667		◌̥᪽ 668	◌̥᫃ 669	◌̥᫄ 670		
Voicing diacritics	ˬ◌ 663 = 403		◌ˬ; 664 = 403		◌˷ 683 = 406		ʰ◌ 671 = 404		

== 700: capital letters ==
The capitals of the basic Latin alphabet, A–Z, are assigned the numbers 701 to 726 in order.

C 703, F 706, J 710, L 712, V 722 and W 723 are redundant with their extIPA numbers 624, 622, 626, 625, 621, 623, respectively.

== 900: transcription delimiters ==
Brackets and other punctuation that mark linguistic transcription

Delimitation characters
phonetic	[ ] 901 902
phonemic	/ 903
silent (mouthing) / indistinguishable	( ) 906 907
sound obscured	⸨ ⸩ 908 909
prosodic	{ } 910 911

Place →	Labial					Coronal										Dorsal					Laryngeal			
Manner ↓	Bilabial		Labiodental		Linguolabial		Dental		Alveolar		Postalveolar		Retroflex		(Alveolo-)palatal		Velar		Uvular		Pharyngeal/epiglottal		Glottal	
Nasal	m̥	m	ɱ̊	ɱ		n̼	n̪̊	n̪	n̥	n	n̠̊	n̠	ɳ̊	ɳ	ɲ̊	ɲ	ŋ̊	ŋ	ɴ̥	ɴ				
Plosive	p	b	p̪	b̪	t̼	d̼	t̪	d̪	t	d			ʈ	ɖ	c	ɟ	k	ɡ	q	ɢ	ʡ		ʔ	
Sibilant affricate							t̪s̪	d̪z̪	ts	dz	t̠ʃ	d̠ʒ	tʂ	dʐ	tɕ	dʑ								
Non-sibilant affricate	pɸ	bβ	p̪f	b̪v			t̪θ	d̪ð	tɹ̝̊	dɹ̝	t̠ɹ̠̊˔	d̠ɹ̠˔			cç	ɟʝ	kx	ɡɣ	qχ	ɢʁ	ʡʜ	ʡʢ	ʔh	
Sibilant fricative							s̪	z̪	s	z	ʃ	ʒ	ʂ	ʐ	ɕ	ʑ								
Non-sibilant fricative	ɸ	β	f	v	θ̼	ð̼	θ	ð	θ̠	ð̠	ɹ̠̊˔	ɹ̠˔	ɻ̊˔	ɻ˔	ç	ʝ	x	ɣ	χ	ʁ	ħ	ʕ	h	ɦ
Approximant		β̞		ʋ				ð̞		ɹ		ɹ̠		ɻ		j		ɰ						˷
Tap/flap		ⱱ̟		ⱱ					ɾ̥	ɾ			ɽ̊	ɽ						ɢ̆		ʡ̆		
Trill	ʙ̥	ʙ							r̥	r		r̠	ɽ̊r̥	ɽr					ʀ̥	ʀ	ʜ	ʢ		
Lateral affricate									tɬ	dɮ			tꞎ	d𝼅	c𝼆	ɟʎ̝	k𝼄	ɡʟ̝						
Lateral fricative							ɬ̪		ɬ	ɮ			ꞎ	𝼅	𝼆	ʎ̝	𝼄	ʟ̝						
Lateral approximant								l̪	l̥	l		l̠	ɭ̊	ɭ	ʎ̥	ʎ	ʟ̥	ʟ		ʟ̠				
Lateral tap/flap									ɺ̥	ɺ			𝼈̊	𝼈		ʎ̆		ʟ̆						

		BL	LD	D	A	PA	RF	P	V	U
Implosive	Voiced	ɓ			ɗ		ᶑ	ʄ	ɠ	ʛ
Implosive	Voiceless	ɓ̥			ɗ̥		ᶑ̊	ʄ̊	ɠ̊	ʛ̥
Ejective	Stop	pʼ			tʼ		ʈʼ	cʼ	kʼ	qʼ
Ejective	Affricate		p̪fʼ	tθʼ	tsʼ	tʃʼ	tʂʼ	tɕʼ	kxʼ	qχʼ
Ejective	Fricative	ɸʼ	fʼ	θʼ	sʼ	ʃʼ	ʂʼ	ɕʼ	xʼ	χʼ
Ejective	Lateral affricate				tɬʼ			c𝼆ʼ	k𝼄ʼ	q𝼄ʼ
Ejective	Lateral fricative				ɬʼ					
Click (top: velar; bottom: uvular)	Tenuis	kʘ qʘ		kǀ qǀ	kǃ qǃ		k𝼊 q𝼊	kǂ qǂ		
Click (top: velar; bottom: uvular)	Voiced	ɡʘ ɢʘ		ɡǀ ɢǀ	ɡǃ ɢǃ		ɡ𝼊 ɢ𝼊	ɡǂ ɢǂ		
Click (top: velar; bottom: uvular)	Nasal	ŋʘ ɴʘ		ŋǀ ɴǀ	ŋǃ ɴǃ		ŋ𝼊 ɴ𝼊	ŋǂ ɴǂ	ʞ	
Click (top: velar; bottom: uvular)	Tenuis lateral				kǁ qǁ					
Click (top: velar; bottom: uvular)	Voiced lateral				ɡǁ ɢǁ					
Click (top: velar; bottom: uvular)	Nasal lateral				ŋǁ ɴǁ					
