= Catalan orthography =

Orthography of the Catalan language

The Catalan and Valencian orthographies encompass the spelling and punctuation of standard Catalan (set by the IEC) and Valencian (set by the AVL). There are also several adapted variants to the peculiarities of local dialects of Insular Catalan (Algherese and the Balearic subdialects).

== History ==
The history of the Catalan and Valencian orthographies shows a singularity in regard to the other Romance languages. These have been mostly developed from Latin, adapting them to their own phonetic particularities. It had been a gradual and slow process through centuries until the creation of the Academies in the 18th century that fixed the orthography from their language dominant variety.

In the case of Catalan and Valencian, the mediaeval orthography had a noticeable homogeneity. The Royal Chancellery set a unitary written model in several fields. Thus, Ramon Muntaner expressed in his Chronicle (1325–1328) that the Catalans are the largest group with a single language, since all the Romance-speaking regions had very divided languages like the difference that exists between Catalans and Aragonese.

In the 16th century, just after the Golden Age, the split of Catalans started. With the isolation of the Royal Court and several political events, the unitary linguistic consciousness and the shared cultural tradition broke off. The production became more dialectal.

In the 19th century, the recovery of the unity emerged, beginning with the orthography. Institutions like the Acadèmia de Bones Lletres or the Floral Games were in the middle of several orthographic dilemmas.

The orthographic norms of Catalan were first defined officially in the First Internationals Congress of the Catalan Language, held in Barcelona in October 1906. Subsequently, the Philological Section of the Institut d'Estudis Catalans (IEC, founded in 1911) published the Normes ortogràfiques in 1913 under the direction of Antoni Maria Alcover and Pompeu Fabra. Despite some opposition, the spelling system was adopted immediately and became widespread enough that, in 1932, Valencian writers and intellectuals gathered in Castelló to make a formal adoption of the so-called Normes de Castelló, a set of guidelines following Pompeu Fabra's Catalan language norms.

In 1917, Fabra published an Orthographic Dictionary following the orthographic norms of the IEC. In 1931–1932 the Diccionari General de la Llengua Catalana (General Dictionary of the Catalan language) appeared. In 1995, a new normative dictionary, the Dictionary of the Catalan Language of the Institute of Catalan Studies (DIEC), marked a new milestone in the orthographic fixation of the language, in addition to the incorporation of neologisms and modern uses of the language.

On the 24th October 2016, the IEC published a new orthography for Catalan, the Ortografia catalana, which outlined several modifications, including a reduced number of monosyllabic words that take an acute or grave diacritic for reasons of disambiguation. Thus, the disyllabic word adéu is now generally spelled adeu; the monosyllabic words sec ("dry", pronounced /sɛk/ in Central Catalan) and séc ("fold, wrinkle", pronounced /sek/) are both written sec after the reform. Discretionary use of a diacritic is possible if the context is not sufficient for disambiguation.

== Alphabet ==
Like those of many other Romance languages, the Catalan and Valencian alphabet derives from the Latin alphabet and is largely based on the respective language's phonology.

The Catalan and Valencian alphabet consists of the 26 letters of the ISO basic Latin alphabet:

Catalan and Valencian alphabet
Upper case	A	B	C	D	E	F	G	H	I	J	K	L	M	N	O	P	Q	R	S	T	U	V	W	X	Y	Z
Lower case	a	b	c	d	e	f	g	h	i	j	k	l	m	n	o	p	q	r	s	t	u	v	w	x	y	z

The following letter-diacritic combinations are used, but they do not constitute distinct letters in the alphabet: À à, É é, È è, Í í, Ï ï, Ó ó, Ò ò, Ú ú, Ü ü and Ç ç (though the Catalan keyboard includes the letter Ç as a separate key). K k and W w are used only in loanwords. Outside loanwords, the letters Q q and Y y appear only in the digraphs qu, qü and ny. However, Y was used until the official orthography was established in 1913, when it was replaced with I, except in the digraph ny and loanwords. Some Catalan surnames conserve the letter y and the word-final digraph ch (pronounced /k/), e. g. Layret, Aymerich.

The following table shows the letters and their names in Standard Catalan (IEC) and Standard Valencian (AVL):

Letter	Catalan		Valencian	
Letter	Name (IEC)	Pronunciation	Name (AVL)	Pronunciation
Aa	a	/ˈa/	a	/ˈa/
Bb	be, be alta	/ˈbe/, /ˈbe ˈaltə/	be, be alta	/ˈbe/, /ˈbe ˈalta/
Cc	ce	/ˈse/	ce	/ˈse/
Dd	de	/ˈde/	de	/ˈde/
Ee	e	/ˈɛ/	e	/ˈe/
Ff	efa	/ˈefə/	efe, ef	/ˈefe/, /ˈef/
Gg	ge	/ˈʒe/	ge	/ˈdʒe/
Hh	hac	/ˈak/	hac	/ˈak/
Ii	i, i llatina	/ˈi/, /ˈi ʎəˈtinə/	i, i llatina	/ˈi/, /ˈi ʎaˈtina/
Jj	jota	/ˈʒɔtə/	jota	/ˈdʒota/
Kk	ca	/ˈka/	ca	/ˈka/
Ll	ela	/ˈelə/	ele, el	/ˈele/, /ˈel/
Mm	ema	/ˈemə/	eme, em	/ˈeme/, /ˈem/
Nn	ena	/ˈenə/	ene, en	/ˈene/, /ˈen/
Oo	o	/ˈɔ/	o	/ˈo/
Pp	pe	/ˈpe/	pe	/ˈpe/
Qq	cu	/ˈku/	cu	/ˈku/
Rr	erra	/ˈerə/	erre, er	/ˈere/, /ˈeɾ/
Ss	essa	/ˈesə/	esse, es	/ˈese/, /ˈes/
Tt	te	/ˈte/	te	/ˈte/
Uu	u	/ˈu/	u	/ˈu/
Vv	ve, ve baixa	/ˈve/, /ˈbe ˈbaʃə/	ve, ve baixa	/ˈve/, /ˈbe ˈbajʃa/
Ww	ve doble	/ˈve ˈdobːlə/, /ˈbe ˈdobːlə/	ve doble	/ˈve ˈdoble/, /ˈbe ˈdoble/
Xx	ics, xeix	/ˈiks/, /ˈʃeʃ/	ics, xeix	/ˈiks/, /ˈʃejʃ/
Yy	i grega	/ˈi ˈɡɾeɡə/	i grega	/ˈi ˈɡɾeɡa/
Zz	zeta	/ˈzɛtə/	zeta	/ˈzeta/

The names efa (/ˈefa/), ela (/ˈela/), ema (/ˈema/), ena (/ˈena/), erra (/ˈera/), and essa (/ˈesa/) are also used in certain speeches of Valencian.

The names be alta ("high b") and ve baixa ("low v") are used by speakers who do not distinguish the phonemes /b/ and /v/. Speakers that do distinguish them use the simple names be and ve.

== Spelling and pronunciation ==
Catalan is a pluricentric language; the pronunciation of some of the letters is different in Central Eastern Catalan (IEC) and Valencian (AVL). Apart from those variations, the pronunciation of most consonants is fairly straightforward and is similar to French, Occitan or Portuguese pronunciation.

=== Spelling-to-sound correspondences ===
The following lists includes a quick pronunciation of letters in standard Catalan and Valencian, for an in-depth view see attached main article on top of this section.

Consonants
Spelling	IPA		Example
Spelling	Catalan	Valencian	Example
b	/b/ (Note: Voiced stops /b, d, g/ become fricatives or approximants in syllable onsets, after continuants: /b/ → [β] (e.g. obert 'open'), /d/ → [ð] (e.g. fada 'fairy'), /ɡ/ → [ɣ] (e.g. segon 'second'). Exceptions include /d/ after lateral consonants and /b/ after the labiodental /f/. In /b/-/v/ distinguishing dialects /b/ fails to lenite.) (Note: In Catalan (not in Valencian), labial /b, p/ and velar stops /ɡ, k/ become geminated ([bː, pː] and [ɡː, kː]) in intervocalic position before a lateral (e.g. poble 'village, people', triple 'triple', regla 'ruler', tecla 'key, from keyboard').) (Note: Final /b, d, ɡ, v, z, dz/ → [p, t, k, f, s, ts] (e.g. club 'club', fred 'cold', reg 'irrigation', salv 'except', brunz 'he or she buzzes', hertz 'hertz' - see final-obstruent devoicing). Etymological final ⟨g⟩ after i /d͡ʒ/ is also devoiced to [t͡ʃ] (e.g. mig 'half'). See also ⟨ig⟩ [t͡ʃ] on the digraph table.)		barra, també
c	/k/, /s/ (Note: Before front vowels e, i (/e, i/, also before schwa in Catalan).)		casa, amic; cent, fàcil
ç	/s/		açò, març
d	/d/		dos, banda
f	/f/		fer, baf
g	/ɡ/, (Note: ⟨g⟩ before nasals (e.g. the group ⟨gn⟩ /ɡn/) is often assimilated to [ŋ] in both Catalan and Valencian (e.g. sagna [ˈsaŋnə] or [ˈsaŋna] 'he or she bleeds').) /ʒ/	/ɡ/, /d͡ʒ/	gana, angle; gel, fugir
h	∅ (Note: /h/ in loanwords (e.g. hawaià 'Hawaiian', hippy 'hippy') and interjections (ehem 'ahem').)		home, ahir
j	/ʒ/ (Note: The Spanish ⟨j⟩ /x/ is found in loanwords like orujo ('grape liqueur') or La Rioja ('La Rioja').)	/d͡ʒ/ (Note: In Valencian, ⟨j⟩ is pronounced /j/ (yod) in terms like jo ('I') and ja ('already').)	jocs, menja
k	/k/		kurd, viking
l	/l/ (Note: Before a palatal (/l/ → /ʎ/: àlgid 'algid').)		lira, ala
m	/m/ (Note: Before a labiodental (/m/ → /ɱ/: limfa 'lymph').)		mal, fum
n	/n/ (Note: Before a bilabial (/n/ → /m/: enmig 'in the middle'), before a labiodental (/n/ → /ɱ/: enfadat 'upset'), before a palatal (/n/ → /ɲ/: àngel 'angel'), and before a velar (/n/ → /ŋ/: sang 'blood').)		nas, entra
p	/p/		peu, copa
q	/k/		quart, freqüent
r	/r/, /ɾ/, (Note: Initial ⟨r⟩ is pronounced /r/ (e.g. ros 'blond'); while intervocalic ⟨r⟩ is pronounced /ɾ/ (vora 'edge'), except in compounds (arítmia 'arrhythmia', pronounced with /r/).) ∅ (Note: At the end of a word or a syllable only.)	/r/, /ɾ/	racó; mare; ser
s	/s/, /z/ (Note: Initial ⟨s⟩ is pronounced /s/ (e.g. suc 'juice'); while intervocalic ⟨s⟩ is pronounced /z/ (cosa 'thing'), except in compounds (antesala 'antechamber', pronounced with /s/).)		savi, pols; casa, trànsit
t	/t/		tou, morter
v	/v/ (or /b/) (Note: In some dialects (except Algherese, Balearic, and Northern and Southern Valencian) /v/ has merged into /b/ (see betacism).)	/v/ (or /b/)	vaca, avet
w	/w/, (Note: Before or after another vowel (also transcribed as [j] and [w]).) /v/ (or /b/)	/w/, /v/ (or /b/)	web, Newton; watt, Ludwig
x	/ʃ/, /ks/, /ɡz/ (Note: The ⟨x⟩ /ks/ pronunciation is found between vowels (e.g. màxim 'maximum'), between a vowel and voiceless consonant (extens 'extensive') and word finally, after a vowel (annex 'annexe') or consonant (larinx 'larynx'). The letter ⟨x⟩ is pronounced /ɡz/ in the initial groups ex- and inex- followed by vowel, ⟨h⟩ or a voiced consonant (examen 'exam', exhortar 'to exhort', exdiputat 'ex-deputy', inexorable 'inexorable').)	/t͡ʃ/, /ʃ/, (Note: In Valencian, ⟨x⟩ is usually pronounced /ʃ/ after the high vocoid /i/ ⟨i⟩ (e.g. ix 'he or she gets out', pixar 'to pee', exceptions include learned terms: fixar 'to fix' and prolix 'prolix', pronounced with /ks/), in proper names or place names like Xàtiva 'Xàtiva' (often mispronounced with an epenthetic ei-) and learned terms like xenofòbia ('xenophobia') and xerografia ('xerography'). In other cases it alternates with /t͡ʃ/: xarop [ʃaˈɾɔp] or [t͡ʃaˈɾɔp] ('syrup'), or it is only pronounced /t͡ʃ/ (xiular 'to whistle', xinxa 'bedbug').) /ks/, /ɡz/	xiular; ix; fixar; èxit
z	/z/		zero, ozó
Main digraphs (Note: The following cases are not regarded as digraphs: Consonant groups like ⟨ng⟩ and ⟨nt⟩ in sang ('blood') and cent ('hundred') when it is elided the last consonant.; Some consonant groups in syllabic opening like ⟨bd⟩, ⟨cn⟩, ⟨ct⟩, ⟨ft⟩, ⟨gn⟩, ⟨mn⟩, ⟨pn⟩, ⟨ps⟩, ⟨pt⟩ or ⟨tm⟩, found in learned words (e.g. bdeŀli 'bdellium', Cnossos 'Knossos', ctenòfors 'ctenophora', ftàlic 'phthalic', gnòstic 'gnostic', mnemotècnic 'mnemotechnics', pneumònia 'pneumonia', psíquic 'psychic', metempsicosi 'metempsychosis', psalm 'psalm', pterodàctil 'pterodactylus', Ptolemeu 'Ptolemy', tmesi 'tmesis'), that are preserved in Catalan.; The graphic groups specific to other languages present in non-adapted borrowings and in derivatives of foreign proper names (e.g. apartheid 'apartheid', au-pair 'au pair', chardonnay 'chardonnay', edelweiss 'edelweiss', freelance 'freelance', jazz 'jazz', kirsch 'kirsch', leishmaniosi 'leishmaniasis, mousse 'mousse', pizza 'pizza', playback 'playback', shakespearià 'Shakespearean', zoom 'zoom').) and letter combinations
Spelling	IPA		Example
Spelling	Catalan	Valencian	Example
gu	/ɡ/ (Note: Before the vowels /a, o/ (spelled ⟨a⟩ and ⟨o⟩) it is pronounced /ɡw/ and /qw/ (e.g. guants 'gloves', quota 'share, fee').)		guerrer, àguila
ig	/t͡ʃ/		raig
ix	/ʃ/	/jʃ/	eixida, feix
ll	/ʎ/		llig, brollar
ŀl	/lː/ (Note: In Valencian, ⟨ŀl⟩ is only geminated in very formal registers. In Catalan it is geminated in careful speech.)	/l/	coŀlegi
ny	/ɲ/		senyal, anys
qu	/k/		qui, aquest
rr	/r/		garra
sc	/s/		ascens
ss	/s/		bossa
tg	/d͡ʒ/		fetge
tj	/d͡ʒ/		viatjar
tl	/lː/ (Note: In Valencian, ⟨tl⟩ and ⟨tn⟩ can be pronounced with gemination or not, ⟨tm⟩ and ⟨tll⟩ are only geminated in very formal registers. In Catalan ⟨tl⟩, ⟨tll⟩, ⟨tm⟩ and ⟨tn⟩ are geminated in careful speech.)	/l/ or /lː/	Betlem
tll	/ʎː/	/ʎ/	bitllet
tm	/mː/	/m/	setmana
tn	/nː/	/n/ or /nː/	cotna
ts	/t͡s/ (Note: In Valencian, initial ⟨ts⟩ (found only in loanwords, e.g. tsar 'tsar') is deaffricated. However, it may be pronounced in very formals registers.)		tsar, potser
tx	/t͡ʃ/		txec, cotxe
tz	/d͡z/	/d͡z/	setze
tz	/d͡z/	/z/ (Note: In Valencian, ⟨tz⟩ is deaffricated in most instances.)	analitzar
Others (foreign and/or old style combinations) (Note: The combinations ⟨ch⟩ (/k/ and /x/), ⟨kh⟩ (mainly /x/, but also /k/), ⟨ph⟩ (/f/) and ⟨th⟩ (/θ/) are found in different contexts in Catalan and Valencian.) (Note: Further foreign combinations include: ⟨lh⟩ for /ʎ/ (e.g. Coelho). The combination ⟨lh⟩ is pronounced /l/ in native words (e.g. alhora 'at the same time').; ⟨nh⟩ for /ɲ/ (e.g. Luisinho). The combination ⟨nh⟩ is pronounced /n/ in native words (e.g. anhel 'yearning').; ⟨sh⟩ for /ʃ/ (e.g. sushi). The combination ⟨sh⟩ is pronounced /z/ in native words (e.g. aleshores 'then').; ⟨zh⟩ for /ʒ/ (e.g. Dolzhenko). The combination ⟨zh⟩ is pronounced /z/ in learned terms (e.g. alzheimer or alzhèimer 'Alzheimer's disease').)
ch	/k/		Folch
ch	/x/ (Note: /x/ in loanwords, like modern Germanisms.)		Bach
kh	/x/		khi, Txékhov
ph	/f/ (Note: /p/ in native words (e.g. caphuitada 'octave day').)		Philip
th	/θ/ (Note: /t/ in native words (e.g. tothom 'everybody').)		theta

Vowels
Spelling	IPA		Example
Spelling	Catalan	Valencian	Example
a	/a/, /ə/	/a/ (Note: In Valencian, final ⟨a⟩ in the masculine forms of the suffix -ista is pronounced [e] (e.g. artista [aɾˈtiste] 'artist', m.). This is sometimes reflected in the orthography (artiste).)	mar; amar
à	/a/		mà
e	/ɛ/, /e/, /ə/	/ɛ/, /e/ (Note: In Valencian, initial ⟨e⟩ is often pronounced [a], especially before nasals (e.g. enclusa [aŋˈkluza] 'anvil') or a sibilant (eixam [ajˈʃam] 'swarm').) (Note: In Valencian, ⟨e⟩ is often pronounced [i] in the suffix -ixement (e.g. coneixement [konejʃiˈment] 'knowledge').)	set; anell; demà
è	/ɛ/, */ə/ (Note: In Insular Catalan, some instances of è are realised as /ə/.)	/ɛ/, /e/	dèbit; què
é	/e/		bé
i	/i/, /i̯/, ∅		dia; feia; raig
í	/i/		veí
ï	/i/		raïm, veïnat
o	/ɔ/, /o/, /u/, /u̯/	/ɔ/, /o/ (Note: In Valencian, ⟨o⟩ is sometimes pronounced [u], particularly before labials (e.g. cobert [kuˈbɛɾt] 'covered, cutlery' ) or a syllable with the vowel /i/ (sospira [susˈpiɾa] 'he or she sighs').)	soc; molt; socors; oasi
ò	/ɔ/		això
ó	/o/		són
u	/u/, /u̯/, /w/, (Note: After [ɡ] or [k] (often analysed as labiovelar consonants /ɡʷ/ and /kʷ/).) ∅		suc; creua; quan; àguila
ú	/u/		ús
ü	/u/, /w/		reüll; egües
y	/i/, /j/		henry; Yuan

=== Sound-to-spelling correspondences ===
The following lists include most sound-to-spelling correspondences in Catalan and Valencian. It also includes gemination as well as more foreign spellings than previous lists (as it is easier to represent them in the charts).

Consonants
IPA		Spelling	Examples
Catalan	Valencian	Spelling	Examples
/m/		m, mh, mm, mp, tm, n	mare, amhàric, Jimmy, prompte, tmesi, benparlat
/mː/		mm, nm, tm (only C.), ntm (only C.)	immens, enmig, setmana (only C.), Sentmenat (only C.)
/ɱ/		m, n	triomf, enfadat
/n/		n, nh, nn, cn, gn, mn, pn	nas, anhel, Anne, Cnossos, gnòstic, mnemotècnic, pneuma
/nː/		nn, tn, ntn (only C.)	innat, cotna, Montnegre (only C.)
/ɲ/		ny, n, ñ, nh, nj, gn	any, engegar, El Niño, caipirinha, oranje, cognac
/ŋ/		n, ng, g, c	Cinca, viking, sagna, tècnic
/p/		p, ph, pp, b	pare, caphuitada, hippy, tub
/pː/		pp, p (only C.)	cappare, triple (only C.)
/b/		b, bh, bb, p	blau, subhasta, lobby, apnea
/bː/		bb, b (only C.), bv (betacist dialects)	abbàssida, poble (only C.), obvi (betacist dialects)
/t/		t, th, tt, ct, ft, pt, d	tou, tothom, dittografia, ctenòfors, ftàlic, pterodàctil, sud
/tː/		tt	posttònic
/d/		d, dh, dd, bd, t	dau, adhesiu, Eddie, bdeŀli, ritme
/dː/		dd	adduir
/k/		c, ch, ck, g, gh, k, q, qu, cqu	casa, Folch, rock, mag, Gogh, kurd, quant, qui, jacquard
/kː/		c (only C.)	tecla (only C.)
/ɡ/		g, gh, gg, c, ch	gat, ogham, ziggurat, ècdisi, Lluchmajor
/ɡː/		gg, g (only C.)	burggravi, segle (only C.)
/f/		f, fh, ff, ph, v, w	ficar, sulfhídric, office, Philip, salv, Tarnowski
/v/ (or /b/)		v, f, w	vi, hafni, wagnerià
/θ/		th, z	theta, López
/ð/		th	The Times
/s/		s, ss, sc, ç, z, zz, sz, ps	sac, massa, escena, caça, brunz, jazz, Szolnok, psíquic
/z/		z, s, sh, zh, zz, tz (only V.), ç	zona, rosa, deshora, alzhèimer, jacuzzi, analitzar (only V.), feliçment
/ʃ/	/t͡ʃ/, /ʃ/ ([jʃ])	x, ix, j, g, ch, sc, sh, sch, sz, s, ti	xaloc, fluix, Vorónej, vintage, Chartres, crescendo, sushi, schorl, Tomasz, Sean, National Geographic
/ʒ/	/d͡ʒ/ ([ʒ], [jʒ])	j, g, x, ix, zh, sh	joc, gespa, tixrí, caixmir, Dolzhenko, flashback
/x/		kh, ch, j	kharja, Bach, Jaén
/h/		h, wh	ehem, The Who
/r/		rr, r, rh	resta, ferro, rhodesià
/ɾ/		r, rh	vora, superhome
/l/		l, lh, ll	laca, alhora, ballet
/lː/ (or /l/)		ŀl, ll, tl	ceŀla, allegro, Betlem
/ʎ/		ll, l, lh, lj, gli	lluç, Elx, Covilhã, Ljubljana, conchiglie
/ʎː/ (or /ʎ/)		tll	bitllet
/j/		i, y, yy, j (only V.), ill	iode, yuppie, Hudaybiyya, ja (only V.), Bouillons
/w/		u, ü, w, wh, ou	creuar, aigües, web, whisky, ouija
/t͡s/		ts, zz, z, c	tsar, pizza, Zemin, Cao Zhi
/d͡z/		tz, zz, z	setze, mezzo, scherzo
/t͡ʃ/		tx, ig, g, igs, gs, ch, tch, tsch, c, cc, ci, cci, tzsch, szcz, q	Txad, faig, llig, reigs, migs, Alborch, sketch, kitsch, Versace, Gucci, ciao, carpaccio, nitzscheà, Szczecin, Qinghai
/d͡ʒ/		tg, tj, ig, g, gg, gi, ggi, zh	fetge, viatjar, Puigbò, migdia, suggerir, adagio, appoggiatura, Zhou
/ks/		x, xc, xs, cc, cs, cks, gs	extra, excels, exsudar, acció, dacsa, snacks, regs
/ɡz/		x, xh, cz, gz	exacte, exhaust, èczema, tagzim
Vowels
IPA		Spelling	Examples
Catalan	Valencian	Spelling	Examples
/a/		a, à, ã, u	sans, mà, João, husky
/ə/	/a/	a, e, o	anís, terrós, Ogariov
/ə/	/e/	e, ea, ae	elàstic, bearnesa, Michael
/ə/	/i/	e	naixement
/əː/	/aː/	aa, aha	aalenià, bahamià
/əː/	/eː/	ee, ehe	reeixir, vehement
/ɛ/		e, è, ä, ea, i	dens, èxit, Händel, spread, Rodin
/e/		e, é, a, eu	eixa, bé, software, amateur
/i/		i, í, ï, y, ee, ie, e, ea	illa, ací, oïda, whisky, jeep, briefing, reality, beat
/iː/		ii	xiisme
/ɔ/		o, ò, ea, ou, aw	bo, açò, Sean, Final Four, Law
/o/		o, ó, au, eau, a, oa	mot, ós, Foucault, Rousseau, Quartet, snowboard
/oː/		oo	zoo
/u/	/u/	u, ú, ü, o, oo, ou	tu, ús, reüll, coberts, zoom, tour
/u/	/o/	o	carro
/uː/	/oː/	oo, oho	coordinar, cohobació
/uː/	/uː/	uu	duu

== Letters ==
=== The sounds [ɡ] and [k] ===
The voiced plosive [ɡ] (or the corresponding fricative [ɣ]) is represented by the spellings g and gu, and the voiceless stop sound [k], by the spellings c, q, qu and, sporadically, g and k.

At the beginning of a syllable, the sounds [ɡ] and [k]:

a) They are represented by g and c, respectively, before the vowels a, o, u, or when they are followed by the liquid consonants l, r: gat ('cat'), govern ('government'), gust ('taste'), glop ('gulp'), groc ('yellow'); casa ('house'), colom ('pigeon'), acurtar ('to shorten'), clam ('clamor'), cremar ('to burn').

b) They are represented by gu and qu, respectively, before the vowels e, i: guerra ('war'), seguir ('to follow'); quimera ('chimera'), paquet ('package, parcel').

In the case of the sound [k], in addition:

c) It is represented by q when it precedes a rising diphthong: conseqüència ('consequence'), quota ('share, fee').
d) The spelling k is used only in certain words from non-Romance languages: kàiser ('kaiser'), kantisme ('Kantianism'), kurd ('Kurdish').

At the end of a syllable, in the inner or final position of the word, the opposition between the unvoiced and the voiced consonant is neutralized, to the extent that it ceases to be distinctive. Regardless of the pronunciation, which can be unvoiced or voiced depending on the phonic context, the use of the spellings c or g conforms to the following rules:

e) Within a word, c is written before c, t, s; instead, g is written before d, m, n: acció ('action'), actriu ('actress'), dacsa ('corn'); amígdala ('tonsil'), fragment ('fragment'), magnitud ('magnitude').

EXCEPTIONS: c is written in some words of cultured formation or from other languages, such as anècdota ('anecdote'), aràcnid ('arachnid'), dracma ('drachma'), pícnic ('picnic'), tècnic ('technician'), etc.

f) At the end of an acute word (oxytone), c is written after a vowel: alifac ('infirmity'), batec ('beat'), pessic ('pinch'), albercoc ('apricot'), caduc ('caducous') and the first person of the present indicative of certain verbs of the second conjugation (bec 'I drink', dec 'I owe', dic 'I say', trac 'I take out', etc.).

EXCEPTIONS: g is written in some acute words of cultured formation or from other languages (buldog 'bulldog', mag 'magician', tuareg 'Tuareg', demagog 'demagogue').

Instead, g or c is written, depending on the spelling of the derivatives, at the end of an acute word after another consonant or at the end of a plain word after a vowel:

fang ('mud') ↔ fangar ('place full of mud')
llarg ('long') ↔ llargària ('length')
pròdig ('prodigal') ↔ prodigar ('to waste, to lavish')

blanc ('white') ↔ blancor ('whiteness')
arc ('arch') ↔ arcada ('arcade, retching')
pràctic ('practical') ↔ practicar ('to practice')

EXCEPTIONS: It is written c, despite having derivatives with g, in some plain or grave words (paroxytones), like aràbic 'Arabic', bròfec ('sullen, scorched'), càrrec ('charge, position [work]'), espàrrec ('asparagus'), etc.

NOTE: In the past, the digraph ch was used in final position, to represent the sound [k], spelling that is still preserved in some lineages: Doménech 'Doménech', March 'March', Pitarch 'Pitarch', Estruch 'Estruch', etc.

=== The representation of the sound [s]: the spellings s, ss, c and ç ===
==== The spelling s ====
The voiceless fricative alveolar sound [s] is represented by s in the following cases:

a) At the beginning of a word: salut ('health, greeting'), senyor ('lord, owner, mister').

b) Between consonant and vowel or between vowel and consonant: ansa ('handle'), aspecte ('aspect').

c) At the end of a word: gos ('dog'), excels ('of great excellence').

EXCEPTIONS: Some words from other languages are written with z, such as hertz ('hertz'), and the noun brunz (buzz), from the verb brunzir (to buzz).

d) After certain prefixes and prefixed forms: asimetria ('asymmetry'), antisocial ('antisocial'), contrasenya ('password'), multisecular ('multisecular'), polisèmia ('polysemy'), psicosomàtic ('psychosomatic'), dinosaure ('dinosaur'), etc.

e) In compound words whose second formant is written with an initial s: esclata-sang ('bloody/saffron milk cap'), para-sol ('parasol, sunshade').

==== The spelling ss ====
The voiceless fricative alveolar sound [s] is represented by ss between vowels: bassa ('pond'), passar ('to pass').

NOTE: The spelling ss preceded by a consonant may also appear in words in which a prefix ending in s, such as trans- or sots-, is attached to a root beginning with s (transsexual 'transsexual', transsiberià 'trans-Siberian', sotssecretari 'sub-secretary') and in the plurals of cultured formation qualssevol ('any, whichever') and qualssevulla ('any, whichever').

==== The spellings c and ç ====
For etymological reasons, the sound [s] is also represented by the spellings c and ç in certain cases:

a) It is represented by ç before a, o, u and at the end of a word: confiança ('trust'), lliçó ('lesson'), vençut ('won, expired'), feliç ('happy').

b) It is represented by c before e, i: ceba ('onion'), bicicleta ('bicycle').

NOTE: In the most common pronunciation, the sc group also represents the [s] sound in words such as piscina ('pool') and ascensor ('lift').

=== The representation of the sound [z]: The spellings s and z ===
The voiced fricative alveolar sound [z] is represented by the spellings z or s, according to the following rules:

a) It is represented by z in word-initial position and between consonant and vowel: zebra ('zebra'), pinzell ('paint brush').

EXCEPTIONS: Derivatives and compounds of fons, dins and trans are written with s: enfonsar ('to send down, to sink'), endinsar ('to put in, to go into'), transatlàntic ('transatlantic'), etc.

b) It is represented by s between vowels: casa ('house'), revisió ('review').

EXCEPTIONS: Some loans and cultisms (learned borrwings) are written with z in intervocalic position: bizantí ('Byzantine'), protozou ('protozoo'), nazisme ('Nazism'), buldòzer ('bulldozer'), etc.

=== The spelling tz ===
In certain heritage words, the spelling tz represents the alveolar affricate phonetic group [dz]: dotze ('twelve'), tretze ('thirteen'), setze ('sixteen').

This same group is also used, with the phonetic value of [z], in the graphic representation of verbs formed with the suffix -itzar (and derivatives), such as caracteritzar ('characterize'), realització ('realization'), etc.

=== The representation of the sounds [ʒ] and [dʒ]: The spellings g, j, tg and tj ===
The voiced fricative palatal sound [ʒ] (Catalan) or the affricate palatal sound [dʒ] (Valencian) is represented by the consonants g and j, according to the following rules:

a) It is represented by g before e, i: àngel ('angel'), àgil ('agile').

EXCEPTIONS: For etymological reasons, j is written before e in certain cases, such as jerarquia ('hierarchy'), jeroglífic ('hieroglyphs'), jersei ('jersey'), jesuïta ('Jesuit'), majestat ('majesty'), etc., and before the groups -ecc- and -ect-: injecció ('injection'), objecte ('object'), etc. In fewer cases, and mainly in loanwords, j is also found before i (Beijing 'Beijing', fijià 'Fijian', Fuji 'Fuji', Jim 'Jim', etc.).

b) It is represented by j before a, o, u: penjar ('to hung [up]'), jove ('young'), dejuni ('fasting').

The spellings tg and tj for the sound [dʒ] in both language standards, which correspond to the geminate pronunciation practiced in some places, are presented only in intervocalic position. Parallel to the corresponding simple spellings, tg is written before e, i, and tj before a, o, u: coratge ('courage'), paisatgístic ('landscape'); desitjar ('to wish'), pitjor ('worse'), corretjut ('leathery, tough').

=== The representation of the sound [tʃ]: The spellings x, tx, ig and g ===
The voiceless affricate palatal sound [tʃ] is represented by the spellings x, tx, ig and g, according to the following rules:

a) At the beginning of a word it is written x: xafar ('to crush'), xiquet ('boy'), Xelva ('Chelva'), Xirivella ('Xirivella'). Note: Those words are pronounced with [tʃ] only in some language varieties (Valencian), in other varieties they are pronounced with [ʃ].

EXCEPTIONS: In word-initial position, it is also represented by tx in some words or proper names from other languages: Txad ('Chad'), Txaikovski ('Chaikovski'), txec ('Czech'), etc.

b) Between vowels it is always represented by tx: clòtxina ('blue mussel'), pitxer ('pitcher').

c) After a consonant is represented by x: anxova ('anchovy'), perxa ('pole, hanger'), ponx ('punch'), Barx ('Barx'), Elx ('Elche'). See the note in the item a).

EXCEPTIONS: It is also represented by tx between consonant and vowel in some words or proper nouns from other languages: solontxac ('solonchak'), Khruixtxov ('Khrushchev').

d) At the end of a word following a vowel, the spelling tx is used if the derivatives are written with tx, and the spelling ig is used (after a, e, o, u) and the spelling g (after i) if the derivatives are written with g/j or tg/tj:

despatx ('office, dispatch') ↔ despatxar ('to complete, to send, to attend')
capritx ('caprice, fancy') ↔ encapritxar ('to cause to fall in love')
cartutx ('cartridge') ↔ cartutxera ('cartridge belt')

bateig ('baptism') ↔ batejar ('to baptize')
roig ('red') ↔ roja ('red', f.)
desig ('wish') ↔ desitjar ('to wish')

=== The representation of the sound [ʃ]: The spelling x ===
The voiceless fricative palatal sound [ʃ] is always represented by the spelling x: Xàtiva ('Xàtiva'), Xavier ('Xavier'), xenòfob ('xenophobic'), coixí ('cushion'), dibuix ('draw'). The letter x in this value can be word-initial, follow a syllabic or non-syllabic i, a non-syllabic u or a consonant. Some speakers do not pronounced a non-syllabic i before an x, so the [ʃ] sound following a syllabic vowel different from i should be written as ix except in compound words (e. g. electroxoc) and in some surnames (e. g. Rexach).

=== The representation of the phonetic group [ks] ===
The phonetic group [ks] is represented by the letter x in the following positions:

a) Between vowels: fixar ('to fix'), màxim ('maximum').

b) Between vowel and voiceless consonant: explosió ('explosion'), extens ('extensive').

c) At the end of a word after a vowel: annex ('annexe), apèndix ('appendix').

EXCEPTIONS: At the end of a word after a consonant, the phonetic group [ks] is also represented, in some cases, by x: esfinx ('sphinx'), larinx ('larynx') and linx ('lynx').

NOTE: The x does not represent the unvoiced group [ks], but the voiced [ɡz], in the initial groups ex- and inex- followed by a vowel, h or voiced consonant: examen ('exam'), exagerar ('to exaggerate'), exhortar ('to exhort'), exdiputat ('ex-deputy'), inexorable ('inexorable').

=== The spellings b and p ===
The bilabial occlusive voiced sound [b] (or the corresponding fricative variant [β]) is represented by the spelling b, and the bilabial voiceless occlusive sound [p], by the spelling p: baix ('low, short'), roba ('clothes'); poc ('little, [a] few'), llépol ('sweet-toothed'), compra ('shopping').

At the end of a syllable, in internal or word-final position, the opposition between voiceless and voiced consonants is neutralized. Regardless of the pronunciation, which can be unvoiced or voiced depending on the context, the use of the spellings b and p conforms to the following rules:

a) At the beginning of a word, the syllables ab-, abs-, ob-, obs-, sub-, subs- are written with b: abdicar ('to abdicate'), abstraure ('to abstract'), objecció ('objection'), obstruir ('to obstruct'), subvenció ('subsidy'), substantiu ('substantive').

EXCEPTIONS: For etymological reasons, some words such as apnea ('apnea'), apte ('apt'), optar ('to opt'), òptica ('opticians'), òptim ('optimal'), etc. are written with p.

b) At the beginning of a word, the syllable cap- is written with p: capçal ('head [of a bed], pillow'), captiu ('captive').

EXCEPTIONS: Some words such as cabdal ('main, primary'), cabdell ('ball [of wool, cotton]'), cabdill ('caudillo'), etc. are written with b.

c) Within a word, p is written before the spellings c, s, n and t: egipci ('Egyptian'), àpside ('apse, apsis, apside'), hipnòtic ('hypnotic'), repte ('challenge').

EXCEPTIONS: For etymological reasons, some words such as dissabte ('Saturday'), dubte ('doubt') and sobte ('suddenly', only used after de) are written with b.

d) At the end of an acute word, p is written after a vowel: cep ('vine, cep'), galop ('gallop'), grup ('group'), xop ('soaked, black poplar').

EXCEPTIONS: For etymological reasons, some words such as adob ('adobe'), aljub ('well, cistern'), club ('club'), esnob ('snob'), íncub ('incubus'), tub ('tube'), etc. are written with b.

Instead, b or p is written, depending on the spelling of the derivatives, at the end of an acute word after another consonant or at the end of a plain word after a vowel:

destorb ('obstacle, nuisance') ↔ destorbar ('to obstruct')
corb ('crow') ↔ corbató ('crow's chick')
àrab ('Arabian') ↔ arabesc ('arabesque')

camp ('countryside, field') ↔ campestre ('rural')
pòlip ('polyp') ↔ polipoide ('polypoid')
serp ('snake') ↔ serpentí ('snakelike, serpentine')

=== The spellings b and v ===
Although some Valencian speakers differentiate the voiced occlusive bilabial sound [b] from the voiced labiodental fricative [v], to avoid confusion in the use of the spellings b and v it is necessary to take into account that b is written in the following cases:

a) Before l and r: bleda ('chard, a passive person'), bromera ('froth, lather').

b) After m: embotit ('stuffed, crammed'), tomba ('tomb').

c) In those cases where it alternates with p in words of the same family: cabut 'big-headed, stubborn' (↔ cap, 'head'), saber 'to know' (↔ sap, 'he/she/it/formal singular you know(s), also ↔saps, informal you know).

NOTE: In some cases, due to differences in cultural or heritage treatment, words from the same family may alternate the use of b and v: avortar ('to abort') / abortiu ('abortive'); calb ('bald') / calvície ('baldness'), cervell ('brain') / cerebral ('cerebral').

And v is written in the following cases:

a) After n: canviar ('to change'), invent ('invent').

b) In those cases where it alternates with u in words of the same family: blava 'blue, f.' (↔ blau, 'blue, m.'), escriviu 'you write' (↔ escriure, 'to write').

c) In the endings of the imperfect indicative of the first conjugation -ava, -aves, -àvem, -aveu, -aven: cantava ('I sang, they sang'), cantaves ('you sang'), cantàvem ('we sang'), cantàveu ('you sang, pl.', cantaven ('they sang, pl.').

=== The spellings d and t ===
The voiced occlusive dental sound [d] (or the corresponding fricative variant [ð]) is represented by the spelling d, and its voiceless correlate [t], by the spelling t: donar ('to give'), banda ('side, band'), badar ('to open [up], to be careless'); tallar ('to cut'), contar ('to tell, to say'), gaiato ('shepherd's crook').

At the end of a syllable, in internal or word-final position, the opposition between voiceless and voiced consonants is neutralized. Regardless of the pronunciation, which can be unvoiced or voiced depending on the phonetic context, the use of the spellings d or t conforms to the following rules:

a) The final consonant of the following syllable is written with d of consonant, in word-initial position: adjudicar ('to award, adjudge'), admissió ('admission').

EXCEPTIONS: For etymological reasons, some words such as atlàntic ('Atlantic'), atles ('atlas'), atleta ('athlete') and atmosfera ('atmosphere') are written with t.

b) At the end of an acute word, t is generally written after a vowel: blat ('wheat'), llet ('milk'), humit ('humid'), bruixot ('warlock'), pelut ('hairy').

EXCEPTIONS: For etymological reasons, some words such as almud ('almude'), fluid ('fluid'), fred ('cold'), sud ('South'); Alfred ('Alfred'), Conrad ('Conrad'), David ('David'), as well as feminine words formed with the cultured endings -etud and -itud: quietud ('stillness, calm'), multitud ('crowd'), etc.

Instead, d or t is written, depending on the spelling of the derivatives, at the end of an acute word after another consonant or at the end of a flat word after a vowel:

verd ('green') ↔ verdós ('greenish')
sord ('deaf') ↔ ensordir ('to deafen')
àrid ('arid') ↔ aridesa ('aridity')

sort ('luck') ↔ sorteig ('draw, sorting')
pont ('bridge') ↔ pontet ('little bridge')
crèdit ('credit') ↔ creditor ('creditor')

=== The spellings m, n, mp, tm and tn ===
The letter m usually represents the nasal bilabial sound [m]: mare ('mother'), cama ('leg'), termal ('thermal'), bram ('bray, roar'), and the n, the nasal alveolar sound [n]: nas ('nose'), manar ('to command'), urna ('urn'), gran ('great, grand').

The spelling mp is used with the value of [m] or [n], for etymological reasons, in a medial syllable, in cases such assumpció ('assumption'), atemptar ('attempt'), compte ('to count'), prompte ('soon'), símptoma ('symptom'), etc.

At the end of a syllable, in word-internal position, the opposition between the nasal consonants is neutralized. In this position, the spellings m or n are used, according to the following rules:

a) m is written before b, f, m and p: símbol ('symbol'), amfiteatre ('amphitheatre'), commoure ('to disturb, to move'), omplir ('to fill [up]').

EXCEPTIONS: The spelling n is kept when it belongs to certain prefixed forms or to the first constituent of a compound word: enmig ('in the middle'), benparlat ('well-spoken'), entornpeu ('baseboard'), etc. As for f, the spelling n is also used in words beginning with con-, in- and in most of those beginning with en-: confessar ('to confess'), confegir ('to spell'); infermer ('nurse'), infinit ('infinite'); enfangar ('to cover with mud'), enfortir ('to strengthen'), etc.

b) n is written before v: convent ('convent'), recanvi ('spare, replacement').

EXCEPTIONS: The spelling m is kept when it belongs to prefixed forms or to the first constituent of a compound word: circumvalació ('ring road'), tramvia ('tramway'), triumvir ('triumvir'), etc.

For etymological reasons, certain borrowings are spelled tm or tn: setmana ('week'), setmesí ('born in the seventh month of gestation'), logaritme ('logarithm'); cotna ('pork rind'), ètnia ('ethnic group, ethnicity').

=== The spelling ny ===
The nasal palatal sound [ɲ] is represented in all positions by the spelling ny: nyora ('a type of pepper'), pinya ('pine cone, pineapple'), codony ('quince [fruit]').

=== The spellings l, ŀl and tl ===
The lateral alveolar sound [l] is represented in all cases by the consonant l: líquid ('liquid'), colar ('to strain'), pèl ('hair'), blat ('wheat').

For etymological reasons, certain words are written with ŀl: aŀlicient ('lure, incentive'), Aveŀlí ('Avelline'), Brusseŀles ('Brussels'), coŀlaborar ('to collaborate'), escarapeŀla ('cockade'), gaŀlicisme ('Gallicism'), iŀlegal ('illegal'), iŀlògic ('illogical'), iŀlusió ('illusion, hope, happiness'), miŀlímetre ('millimeter'), síŀlaba ('syllable'), aquareŀla ('watercolour'), etc.

Some heritage words that have a geminate pronunciation [lː] in a part of Valencian are written with the spelling tl, such as ametla ('almond'), batle ('mayor'), guatla ('quail'), motle ('mold'), vetlar ('to stay up, to patrol, to watch over'), etc. However, the spelling tl represents the sounds [dl] in borrowings such as atles ('atlas'), atlàntic ('Atlantic'), etc.

=== The spellings ll and tll ===
The lateral palatal sound [ʎ] is usually represented by the letter ll, which can appear in any position: llebre ('hare'), pallasso ('clown'), coll ('neck').

But, in certain cases, it is also represented by the spelling tll ([ʎː] in Standard Catalan): bitllet ('ticket, bank note'), rotllo ('roll, annoyance'), ratlla ('line, scratch'), etc.

=== The spellings r and rr ===
The spelling r is used to represent the alveolar tap sound [ɾ] and the vibrating alveolar sound [r]: mira ('they look') / mirra ('myrrh').

The tap is always represented by the spelling r, while the vibrating is represented by the spellings r or rr, according to the following rules:

a) r is written at the beginning of a word or after l, n and s: rabosa ('fox'), honrat ('honoured').

b) rr is written between vowels: barranc ('cliff'), terra ('Earth, land').

EXCEPTIONS: The sound [r] is also represented by the spelling r in intervocalic position when it follows a prefix, a prefixed form or a formant of a compound word ending in a vowel: arítmia ('arrhythmia'), contrarestar ('counteract'), vicerector ('vice-rector'), malva-rosa (rose geranium), etc.

=== The h spelling ===
The h spelling is usually silent; it is used, for etymological reasons, in a series of words, such as harmonia ('harmony'), herba ('herb'), hivern ('winter'), ahir ('yesterday'), etc.

NOTE: In certain interjections or in words derived from foreign proper names, the spelling h is pronounced aspirated: ehem ('ahem'), ha ('ha [laugh]'), he ('he [laugh]'), hegelià ('Hegelian').

=== The spelling w ===
The spelling w is used in certain words from other languages, but it represents two different phonic values depending on whether they have a Germanic or Anglo-Saxon origin:

a) In words of continental Germanic origin, it represents the voiced bilabial fricative sound [v]: wagnerià ('Wagnerian'), wolframi ('tungsten').

b) In words of Anglo-Saxon origin, it has a phonic value equivalent to that of the semivowel u [w]: whisky ('whisk[e]y'), wèlter ('welter').

=== The spelling y ===
The spelling y, in addition to being used to form the digraph ny, is also used independently, with the phonetic value that would correspond to i, in the representation of certain words from other languages or formed from proper names: faraday ('faraday'), gray ('gray'), jansky ('jansky'), Nova York ('New York'), etc.

== Diacritics ==
=== Accentuation ===
==== Acute and grave accents ====
Catalan and Valencian also use the acute and grave accents to mark stress or vowel quality. An acute on ⟨é ó⟩ indicates that the vowel is stressed and close-mid (/e o/), while grave on ⟨è ò⟩ indicates that the vowel is stressed and open-mid (/ɛ ɔ/). Grave on ⟨à⟩ and acute on ⟨í ú⟩ simply indicate that the vowels are stressed. Thus, the acute is used on close or close-mid vowels, and the grave on open or open-mid vowels. For example:

- també: /təmˈbe/ or /tamˈbe/ ('also')
- èxtasi: /ˈɛkstəzi/ or /ˈɛkstazi/ ('ecstasy')
- córrer: /ˈkorə/ or /ˈkoreɾ/ ('to run')
- pròxim: /ˈpɾɔksim/ ('nearby')
- ànima: /ˈanimə/ or /ˈanima/ ('soul')
- pastís: /pəsˈtis/ or /pasˈtis/ ('pie')
- fúcsia: /ˈfuksiə/ or /ˈfuksia/ ('fuchsia')

Standard rules governing the presence of accents are based on word endings and the position of the stressed syllable. In particular, accents are expected for:

- Oxytones ending in a syllabic vowel, a vowel + -⟨s⟩, or -⟨en⟩/⟨in⟩, examples:
  - parlà /pəɾˈla/ or /paɾˈla/ ('he spoke')
  - parlés /pəɾˈles/ or /paɾˈles/ ('that he spoke' past subjunctive)
  - entén /ənˈten/ or /enˈten/ ('he understands')

This does not occur in words like parleu /pəɾˈlɛw/ or /paɾˈlɛw/ ('you are speaking' plural), or parlem /pəɾˈlɛm/ or /paɾˈlɛm/ ('we are speaking').

- Paroxytones with any other ending, including non-syllabic -⟨i⟩, -⟨u⟩, examples:
  - parlàveu /pəɾˈlabəw/ or /paɾˈlavew/ ('you were speaking' plural)
  - parlàvem /pəɾˈlabəm/ or /paɾˈlavem/ ('we were speaking')

This does not occur in words like parla /ˈpaɾlə/ or /ˈpaɾla/ ('he is speaking'), parles /ˈpaɾləs/ or /ˈpaɾles/ ('you are speaking' singular), or parlen /ˈpaɾlən/ or /ˈpaɾlen/ ('they are speaking').

- Any proparoxytones, examples:
  - química /ˈkimikə/ or /ˈkimika/ ('chemistry')
  - ciència /siˈɛnsiə/ or /siˈɛnsia/ ('science')

Since there is no need to mark the stressed syllable of a monosyllabic word, most of them do not have an accent. Exceptions are those with a diacritical accent differentiating words that would otherwise be homographic. Example: es /əs/ or /es/ ('it' impersonal) vs és /ˈes/ ('is'), te /tə/ or /te/ ('you' clitic) vs té /ˈte/ ('s/he has'), mes /ˈmɛs/ or /ˈmes/ ('month') vs més /ˈmes/ ('more'), dona /ˈdɔnə/ or /ˈdɔna/ ('woman') vs dóna /ˈdonə/ or /ˈdona/ ('s/he gives'). In most cases, the word bearing no accent is either unstressed (as in the case of 'es' and 'te'), or the word without the accent is more common, usually a function word.

The different distribution of open e /ɛ/ vs closed e /e/ between Eastern Catalan and Western Catalan is reflected in some orthographic divergences between standard Catalan and Valencian norms, for example: anglès /əŋˈɡlɛs/ (Catalan) vs anglés /aŋˈɡles/ (Valencian) ('English'). In the Balearic Islands, open e /ɛ/ tends to be a centralised e (/ə/) in the same cases where open e contrasts with closed e in Catalan and Valencian. The cases where the difference of pronunciation of e can have graphical repercussions are the followings:

- Words ending with the demonym -es (anglès / anglés 'English', francès / francés 'French'), the past participles (admès / admés 'admitted', compromès / compromés 'committed') and adjectives (cortès / cortés 'courteous').
- The ordinal numerals ending in stressed e: cinquè / cinqué ('fifth'), sisè / sisé ('sixth').
- The ending of the third person of the plural of indicative -en of some verbs of the 2nd conjugation (aprèn / aprén 'learn', comprèn / comprén 'comprehend', depèn / depén 'depend'), except in the cases where this ending is preceded by the consonant t or c, where it is pronounced with a closed e in all speeches (atén 'attend', entén 'understand', pretén 'pretend', encén 'switch on').
- The infinitives ending in -eixer (conèixer / conéixer 'to know', merèixer / meréixer 'to deserve', parèixer / paréixer 'to seem', but uniquely créixer 'to grow') and -encer (vèncer / véncer 'to win', convèncer / convéncer 'to convince').
- The second and third person of the plural of the simple past tense of indicative with accent on the radical: fèiem / féiem 'we did', fèieu / féieu 'you pl. did'.

==== Circumflex ====
The circumflex is rarely used in modern Catalan and Valencian, nonetheless it has been used in the beginning of the 19th century by Antoni Febrer i Cardona to represent schwa in the Balearic subdialects. According to the Diccionari català-valencià-balear, in modern times there are some cases where the circumflex can be used to indicate silent etymological sounds (similar to French) or a contraction. Contrary to the restrictions of the acute and grave accent, the circumflex can be used with all vowels ⟨â ê î ô û⟩, the most common, especially in Valencian, being ⟨â⟩ (i.e. due to the elision of /d/), e.g. mascletâes (instead of mascletades 'pyrotechnic festivals'), anâ (instead of anar 'to go'), témê (instead of témer 'to fear'), sortî (instead of sortir 'to exit'), pâ (instead of per 'for' akin to Colloquial Spanish 'pa' from para 'for').

=== Diaeresis ===
The diaeresis has two different uses: to mark hiatus over ⟨ï, ü⟩, and to mark that ⟨u⟩ is not silent in the groups ⟨gü, qü⟩.

If a diaeresis appears over an ⟨i⟩ or ⟨u⟩ that follows another vowel, it denotes a hiatus, examples:

- raïm /rəˈim/ or /raˈim/ ('grape')
- taüt /təˈut/ or /taˈut/ ('coffin')

This diaeresis is not used over a stressed vowel that already should have an accent. Examples: suís /suˈis/ ('Swiss' masculine), but suïssa /suˈisə/ or /suˈisa/ ('Swiss' feminine), suïs /ˈsuis/ ('that you sweat' subjunctive) (without the diaeresis, this last example would be pronounced /ˈsui̯s/, i.e. as only one syllable, like reis /ˈrei̯s/ 'kings').

Certain verb forms of verbs ending in -uir do not receive a diaeresis, although they are pronounced with separate syllables. This concerns the infinitive, gerund, future and conditional forms (for example traduir, traduint, traduiré and traduiria, all with bisyllabic /u.i/). All other forms of such verbs do receive a diaeresis on the ï according to the normal rules (e.g. traduïm, traduïa).

In addition to this, ⟨ü⟩ represents /w/ between a velar consonant /ɡ/ or /k/ and a front vowel (⟨gu⟩ and ⟨qu⟩ are used to represent a hard (i.e. velar) pronunciation before ⟨i⟩ or ⟨e⟩).

- ungüent /uŋˈɡwen(t)/ ('ointment')
- qüestió /kwəstiˈo/ or /kwestiˈo/ ('topic')

Forms of the verb argüir represents a rare case of the sequence /ɡu.i/, and the rules for /gu/ and /ui/ clash in this case. The ambiguity is resolved by an additional rule, which states that in cases where diaereses would appear on two consecutive letters, only the second receives one. This thus gives arguïm /arguˈim/, i.e. and arguïa /arguˈia/, but argüir /arˈgwir/, argüint /arˈgwint/ and argüiré /argwiˈre/ as these forms don't receive a diaeresis on the i normally, according to the exception above.

=== Ce trencada (c-cedilla) ===
Catalan and Valencian ce trencada (Ç ç), literally 'broken c', is a modified ⟨c⟩ with a cedilla mark ( ¸ ). It is only used before ⟨a o u⟩ to indicate a soft c /s/ because using ⟨s⟩, much like in Portuguese, Occitan or French, would make it pronounced [z] (e.g. compare coça /ˈkosə/ or /ˈkosa/ 'kick', coca /ˈkokə/ or /ˈkoka/ 'cake' and cosa /ˈkɔzə/ or /ˈkɔza/ 'thing'). In Catalan and Valencian, ce trencada also appears as last letter of a word (e.g. feliç /fəˈlis/ or /feˈlis/ 'happy', falç /ˈfals/ 'sickle'), but then ⟨ç⟩ may be voiced to [z] before vowels and voiced consonants, e.g. feliçment /fəˌlizˈmen(t)/ or /feˌlizˈmen(t)/ ('happily') and braç esquerre /ˈbɾaz əsˈkɛrə/ or /ˈbɾaz esˈkɛre/ ('left arm').

== Capitalization ==
Neither of the Catalan and Valencian standards capitalise days of the week, months, or demonyms. Although, like in English, both standards capitalise proper nouns.

dilluns, setembre, anglès, Barcelona
'Monday', 'September', 'English', 'Barcelona'

== Punctuation ==
Catalan and Valencian punctuation rules are similar to English, with some minor differences.

- Guillemets (cometes baixes) « » are frequently used instead of double inverted commas. They are used to mark titles of works, or phrases used as proper names.
- In texts containing dialogue, quoted speech is usually set off with dashes, rather than inverted commas.

—Què proposes, doncs?
—El que hauríem de fer —s'atreví a suggerir— és anar a...
'What do you propose, then?'
'What we should do' she ventured to suggest 'is to go to...'

- In Catalan, there is no ⟨¿⟩ or ⟨¡⟩ unlike in Spanish, but in Valencian questions and exclamations are optionally opened with a ⟨¿⟩ or ⟨¡⟩, like in Spanish. Before 1993, questions and exclamations could be enclosed with ¿...? or ¡...!, but this is no longer recommended by the IEC but still is optionally allowed by the AVL.

=== Punt volat (middot) ===
The punt volat or middot is only used in the sequence ⟨ŀl⟩ (called ela or el(e) geminada, 'geminated l') to represent a geminated sound /lː/ (often simplified to /l/, especially in Valencian), as the digraph ⟨ll⟩ is used for the palatal lateral /ʎ/. This usage of the middot sign dates to the beginning of twentieth century; in medieval and modern Catalan, before Fabra's standardisation, it was sometimes used to note certain elisions, especially in poetry. The only (and improbable) possibility of ambiguity in the whole language is the pair ceŀla /ˈsɛlːa/ ('cell') vs cella /ˈseʎa/ ('eyebrow').

=== Hyphen ===
The hyphen (called a guionet) is used in Catalan and Valencian to separate a verb and the combination of pronouns that follow them (e.g. menjar-se-les), to separate certain compounds (e.g. vint-i-un and para-sol), and to split a word at the end of a line of text for the purpose of maintaining page margins.

Compounds are hyphenated in cases that involve numerals (e.g. trenta-sis, and trenta-sisè/é); cardinal points (e.g. sud-americà); repetitive and expressive compounds (xup-xup); those compounds in which the first element ends in a vowel and the second starts with ⟨r⟩, ⟨s⟩, or ⟨x⟩ (e.g. penya-segat); and those compounds in which the combination of the two elements can lead to wrong reading (e.g. pit-roig). There are also compound terms in which the first element carries a grave accent (mà-llarg), the construction no plus noun (but not no plus adjective, no-violència but the nacions no violentes) and certain singular constructions like abans-d'ahir and adéu-siau.

The hyphen in numbers is set according to the D-U-C rule (Desenes-Unitats-Centenes, 'Tens-Units-Hundreds'), thus, a hyphen is placed between tens and units (quaranta-dos) and between units and hundreds (tres-cents). For example, the number 35,422 is written trenta-cinc mil quatre-cents vint-i-dos.

When a word gets separated due to a new line, syllable boundaries are kept, although, there are some digraphs that can be separated. These digraphs are those that, when splitting them, they result in two graphs the corresponding sound from which they share a phonetic trait with the sound of the digraph. The digraphs that cannot be separated are those in which the two graphs correspond to sounds that they are not related with the sound of the digraph.

The syllabic separation of words follow the following rules:

- The following digraphs and combination of letters can be separated:

ix (quei-xa), rr (car-rer), ss (pas-sar), sc (es-ce-na), l·l (vil-la), tj (jut-jat), tg (fet-ge), tx (pit-xer), tl (vet-la), tll (rot-llo), tm (rit-me), tn (cot-na), ts (pot-ser), tx (despat-xar), tz (set-ze), mm (im-mens), nn (in-no-cent)

- The following digraphs cannot be separated:

gu (jo-guet), ny (pe-nya), qu (pa-quet), ig (ba-teig), ll (pe-lle-ter)

- The constituents of a compound, or the prefix of a prefixed word, can be separated:

ad-herir, in-expert, ben-estar, mil-hòmens, des-encolar, vos-altres

- Letters cannot be left on their own at the end or beginning of a line:

d'a-mor, aber-rant, l'a-plicació, histò-ria

=== Apostrophes ===
Catalan and Valencian follow some apostrophisation rules that serve to determine whether it is necessary to use an apostrophe (') or not

Articles

The masculine singular articles (el, en, and dialectally lo, in Continental Catalan; and es and so in Balearic), and the feminine singular articles (la, na and dialectally sa) are apostrophised before all masculine words that begin with a vowel, e.g. l'avió, l'encant, l'odi, n'Albert, s'arbre, and l'emoció, l'ungla, l'aigua; with a silent h, e.g. l'home, l'ham, n'Hug, s'home, and l'heura, l'holografia, n'Hermínia, s'horabaixa. The masculine singular article also contract when the next word starts with s + consonant, e.g. l'spa, l'Stuttgart; but la Scala de Milà. They aren't apostrophised before words that begin with an ⟨i⟩ or ⟨u⟩ (with or without h) that is pronounced [j] or [w], or for the feminine articles when the word begins with an unstressed ⟨i⟩ or ⟨u⟩, e.g. el iogurt, el iode (or dialectally lo iogurt, lo iode), and, la hiena, la humitat, la universitat, la imatge. Additionally, la, na and sa before letter names, e.g. la i, la hac, la essa; and some other specific words like la una (when referring to the time), la ira, la host, etc. .

The forms al (dial. as), del (dial. des), pel (dial. pes), cal (dial. cas) and can are broken and become a l' (dial. a s'), de l' (dial. de s'), per l' (dial. per s'), ca l' (dial. ca s') and ca n' respectively.

Traditionally, to avoid ambiguity, words beginning with the negative prefix a- did not take an apostrophe. Nowadays, general apostrophising rules are followed: l'anormalitat, l'amoralitat, l'atipicitat, l'asimetria, l'asèpsia, etc. . The 1995 edition of the Diccionari de l'Institut d'Estudis Catalans (DIEC) started was the first one to use this rule, however, it was never explicitly stated.

The preposition de

The preposition de changes into d' in all the same cases as the feminine singular articles with one exception: normally it doesn't contract in metalanguage: el plural de alt és alts.

Weak pronouns

Weak pronouns take the apostrophe in the following cases:

Before a verb that starts with a vowel, using its elided form: m'agrada, n'abastava, s'estimaran, l'aconseguiria, at the end of a verb that finishes in a vowel, using the reduced form: menja'n, trenca'l, fondre's, compra'ns, between two of them if the other orthographic rules allow it: me'n, li'n , se'm, te'ls, la'n, n'hi; if it is possible, it takes the apostrophe with the following word, like me n'ha dut tres. The apostrophe always goes the further to the right possible: te l'emportes, not *te'l emportes.

Does not take the apostrophe:

The pronouns us, vos, hi, ho, li, les: us el dono or vos el done, se us esperava or se vos esperava. Like in the case of the article, the pronoun before words that start by unstressed i and u (with silent h or without): la ignora, la hi pren, la humitejarem, la usàvem. It also does not take the apostrophe the first weak pronoun in the forms la hi and se us.

== Other conventions ==
The distribution of the two rhotics /r/ and /ɾ/ closely parallels that of Spanish. Between vowels, the two contrast but they are otherwise in complementary distribution: in the onset, an alveolar trill, [r], appears unless preceded by a consonant; different dialects vary in regards to rhotics in the coda with Western Catalan generally featuring an alveolar tap, [ɾ], and Central Catalan dialects like those of Barcelona or Girona featuring a weakly trilled [r] unless it precedes a vowel-initial word in the same prosodic unit, in which case [ɾ] appears.

In Eastern Catalan and North Western Catalan, most instances of word-final ⟨r⟩ are silent, but there are plenty of unpredictable exceptions (e.g. in Central Eastern Catalan por [ˈpo] 'fear' but mar [ˈmaɾ] 'sea').

In Valencian, most instances of word-final ⟨r⟩ are pronounced.

== See also ==
- Catalan manual alphabet
- Catalan Braille

== Bibliography ==
- Ortografia catalana. Institut d'Estudis Catalans
- Gramàtica normativa valenciana. Acadèmia Valenciana de la Llengua (PDF).
- Carbonell, Joan F.; Llisterri, Joaquim (1992). "Catalan". Journal of the International Phonetic Association. 22 (1–2): 53–56. doi:10.1017/S0025100300004618. S2CID 249411809.
- Padgett, Jaye (2003). Systemic contrast and Catalan rhotics. University of California, Santa Cruz.
- Swan, Michael; Smith, Bernard (26 April 2001). Learner English: A Teacher's Guide to Interference and Other Problems. Cambridge University Press. ISBN 978-0-521-77939-5.
- Wheeler, Max W.; Yates, Alan; Dols, Nicolau (1999). Catalan: A Comprehensive Grammar. New York: Routledge. ISBN 0-415-20777-0.
- Wheeler, Max W. (2005). The Phonology Of Catalan. Oxford: Oxford University Press. ISBN 0-19-925814-7.
