= Optimot =

Optimot (pronounced oop-tee-MOT), linguistic inquiries, is a service provided by the Directorate - General of Linguistic Policy of the Catalan Government in collaboration with the Institute for Catalan Studies and the Terminology Center TERMCAT. It consists of a search engine for linguistic information that helps to clarify doubts about the Catalan language. With Optimot different sources can be checked at the same time in an integrated way. When the search options provided by Optimot do not manage to answer the linguistic question, a personalized inquiry service can be accessed.

== History ==
Up to 2007, the Consortium for Linguistic Normalization, the TERMCAT Terminology Centre, the Institute of Catalan Studies, and the directorate-general of Linguistics Politics dealt with linguistic inquiries that came from general population, companies, organizations, and language professionals. In order to avoid decentralization of the linguistic enquiries and to offer a unified service, Optimot was implemented. The search engine started working in October 2007 and the personalized service began in February 2008. Mainly, Optimot was to improve quality in linguistic-inquiry service by unifying criteria, and to promote linguistic autonomy.

== Search sources ==
The sources used in the searches performed by Optimot are the following:

- The Dictionary of the Catalan Language by the Institute of Catalan Studies (2nd edition)

It is the regulatory dictionary of the Catalan language.

- Catalan-Castilian Dictionary and Castilian-Catalan Dictionary (4th edition) of the Catalan Encyclopedia

They are bilingual dictionaries, Catalan-Castilian and Castilian-Catalan that include general lexicon, phraseology and proper noun.

- Optimot Linguistic Cards

They are brief cards that explain in a didactic manner linguistic contents (related to orthography, syntax, morphology, lexicon...) and other significant aspects of the language (phraseology, sayings, toponymy...). The cards are meant to solve frequent linguistic doubts.

- Conjugated verbs from the Grammar of the Catalan Language by the Institute for Catalan Studies (temporary version)

They are the conjugation models from the Grammar of the Catalan Language by The Institute for Catalan Studies (temporary version) with the general forms and the main dialectal variants and with the full conjugation of the simple and compound times.

- TERMCAT Terminological Dictionaries

They are dictionaries created by the TERMCAT Terminology Centre which collect specialized lexis from different knowledge domains.

- The collection of Linguistic Criteria by the directorate-general of Linguistic Politics

They are monographies about language conventional aspects (capital letters and abbreviations) and questions of style (writing and translating criteria and non-sexist language).

- Nomenclàtor official de toponímia major de Catalunya by the Commission of Toponymy of Catalonia (2nd edition)

Nomenclàtor official de toponímia major de Catalunya by the Commission of Toponymy of Catalonia.

- Nomenclàtor toponímic de la Catalunya del Nord by the Institute of Catalan Studies in collaboration with the University of Perpinyà

It collects the Catalan form and pronunciation of the most meaningful toponyms in Northern Catalonia.

== See also ==
- TERMCAT
