= Hiking Club of Catalonia =

Spanish sporting and cultural organisation

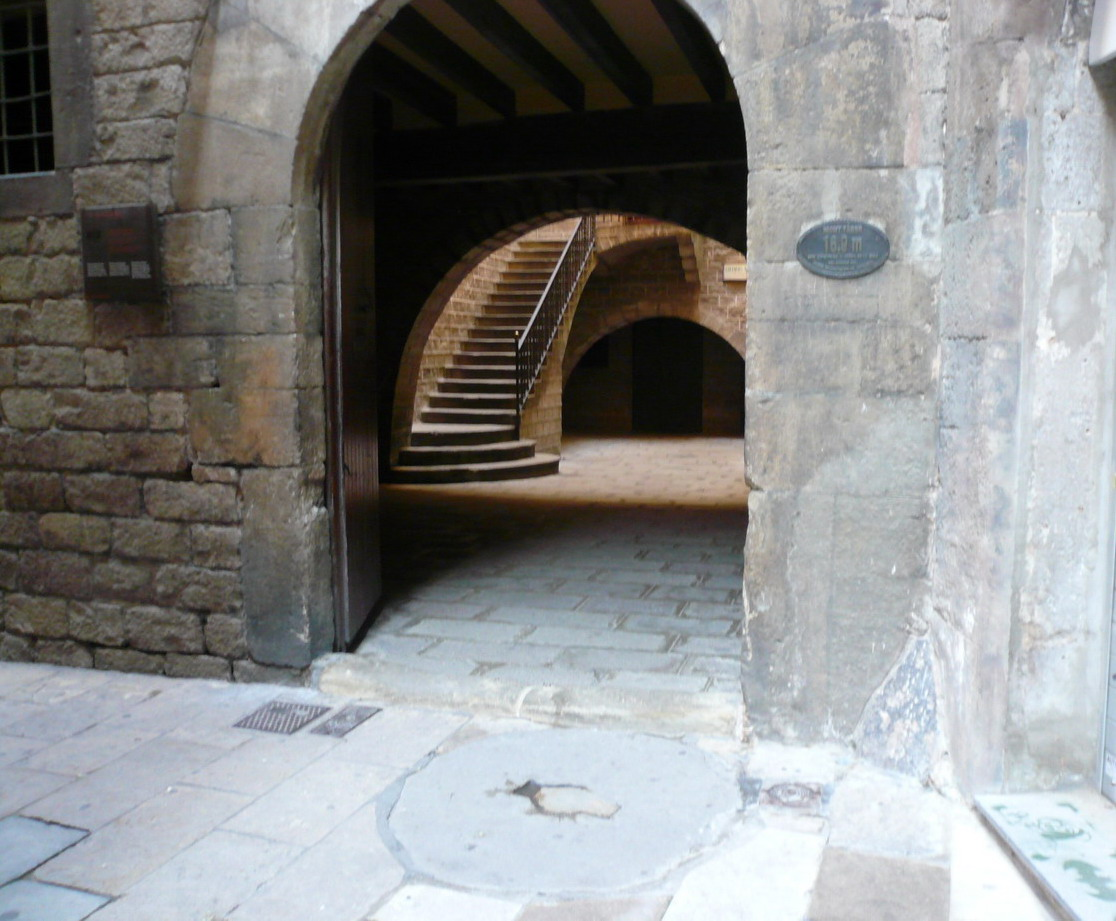
The entrance of the headquarters of the club in Carrer del Paradís, Barcelona.

The Hiking Club of Catalonia (Catalan: Centre Excursionista de Catalunya) is a sporting and cultural organisation founded in 1876 and today offering services that include courses in mountaineering and organised hikes. The club also has a library of maps and photographs.

The Club was founded during a period known as, and by people involved in, the Catalan Renaissance, for the purposes of investigating the richness of Catalonia from the perspectives of science, literature and the arts.

The Club was instrumental in promoting the Catalan language. In 1906 it organised the First International Congress on the Catalan Language. In 1907 it passed a resolution to create the Institute for Catalan Studies to pursue the study in a more academic way.

In order to explore Catalonia's architectural heritage, the architect and politician Lluís Domènech i Montaner visited the Valleys of Boí and Taüll near the border with Aragon in 1904, 1905 and 1906. In September 1907 the Institute for Catalan Studies and the Club organised a now famous archaeological mission to the area bringing to light important churches and their frescoes, now the subject of a World Heritage Site. Amongst those who undertook the trip in 1907 was the influential architect, politician and art historian Josep Puig i Cadafalch who wanted to make an inventory of the architectural and artistic heritage of Catalonia. Joana Vidal i Tarragó lectured them about folklore.

After the Spanish Civil War, when it was prohibited to use Catalan in the public sphere, the Club was the first organisation to publicly teach in Catalan, using as a pretext the need to know the toponymy of Catalonia.

In 1999 the Club was awarded a UNESCO Medal.

== Notable members ==
- Pompeu Fabra (1868–1948), engineer and grammarian
- Norberto Font y Sagué (1874–1910), geologist, naturalist and writer
- Marcel·lí Gausachs (1891–1931), photographer
- Antoni Gaudí (1852 - 1926). Architect
