= Ester Bonet =

Spanish philologist and linguist (born 1950)

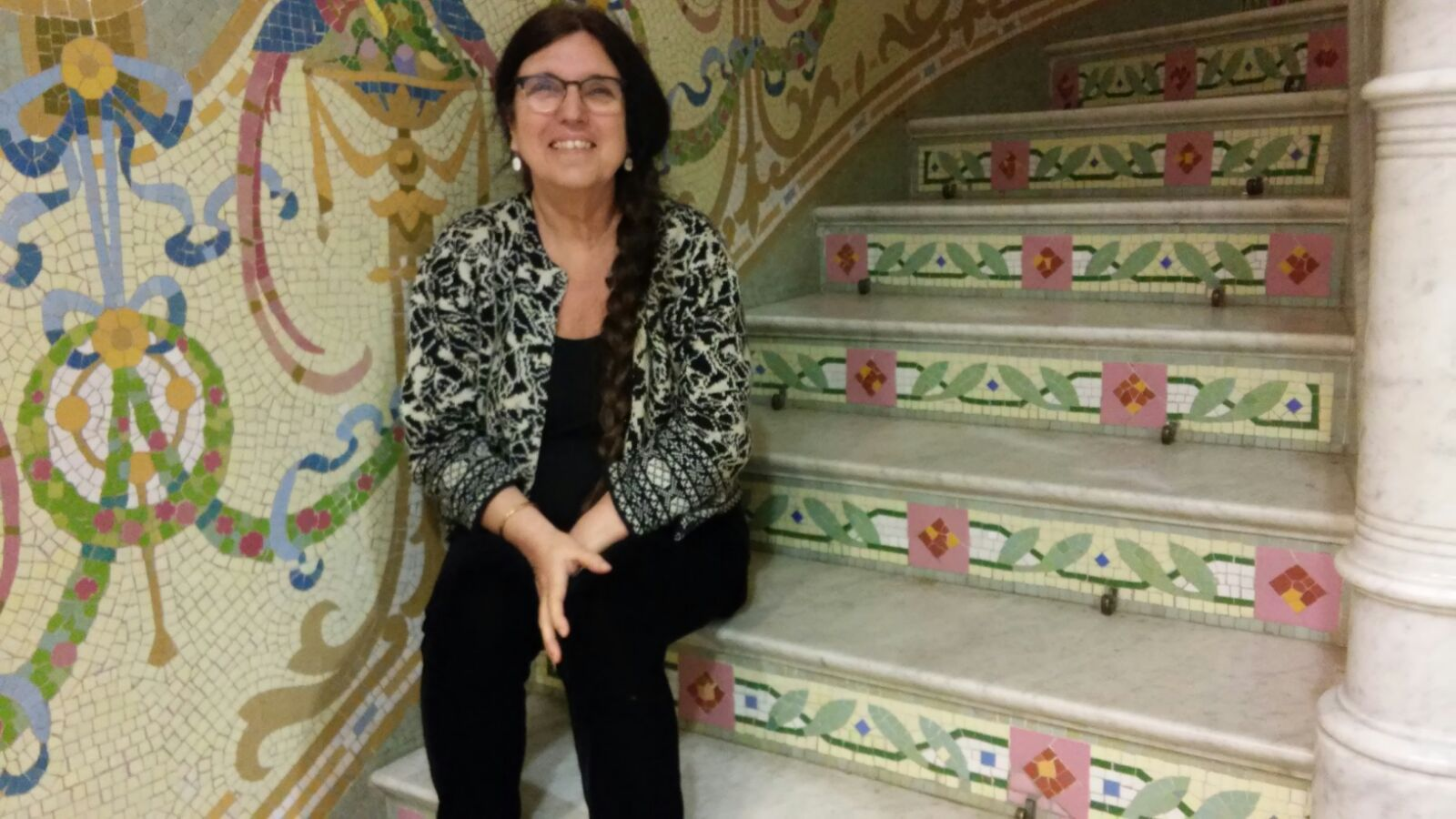
- Bonet in 2017
- Born: Ester Bonet Solé; December 30, 1950 (age 75); Barcelona, Spain
- Education: University of Barcelona
- Occupations: philologist; linguist
- Organization(s): President, Catalan Society of Terminology at the Institute of Catalan Studies
- Known for: sports terminology

Ester Bonet Solé (Barcelona, 30 December 1950) is a Spanish Catalan philologist and linguist. Since 2020, she has held the position of President of the Catalan Society of Terminology at the Institute of Catalan Studies.

== Biography ==
Bonet holds degrees in Physical education and Catalan philology, and a master's degree in Applied linguistics from the University of Barcelona. She has subsequently dedicated herself professionally to sports terminology, a field in which Bonet has developed research, consultancy and training activities.

Bonet began her relationship with lexicology and sports terminology in 1986, coinciding with the Olympic designation of Barcelona. At that time, she participated in the writing of the Diccionari de l'esport (1989) and coordinated the publication of the twenty-nine Olympic sports dictionaries of TERMCAT. With first-hand knowledge of the neology that occurs day by day in the sports field, she has advised TERMCAT since its foundation in 1985, and has directed the Linguistic Service of the Sports Federation Union of Catalonia (UFEC) since 1991.

She has served on the editorial board of the magazine Terminàlia since 2009, and is the editorial coordinator; published by the Catalan Association of Terminology, of which she is a member, serving on its Board of Directors, and holding various positions. In its origins as the Catalan Association of Terminology (ACATERM), she was a founding member. Bonet was also one of the signatories of the Manifest Koiné in favor of Catalan as an official language.

Bonet is affiliated with various Wikipedia projects including Viquidones, Catalan Wikipedians, Amical Wikimedia, and Wikimedia España. She is a specialist in discourse analysis from a gender perspective, promoting work that aims to correct the underrepresentation of women in this encyclopedia.
