= IEC Dictionary of the Catalan Language =

The Dictionary of the Catalan language of the Institute of Catalan Studies (DIEC) is the dictionary of Catalan of the Institute of Catalan Studies (IEC) and, therefore, the standard reference dictionary for the Catalan language, together with the dictionary of standard Valencian produced by the AVL.

It is a monolingual dictionary of definitions. As a normative work it "establishes the shape and the meaning of the words generally recognised as belonging to the Catalan language".

== History ==
The idea of creating the dictionary arose from the determination of the Philological Section of the Institute to normalise and unify the Catalan language. The project began under the presidency of Pompeu Fabra i Poch with the creation of the "Spelling Rules", the "Spelling Dictionary" and the "Grammar".

In 1932, after four years' preparation, the Philological Section published the first edition of the "General Dictionary of the Catalan language" (DGLC), the DIEC's predecessor, and it managed to unify the spelling system, cleanse the lexicon, fix the grammar and introduce neologisms.

The DGLC began to be considered the official dictionary of the Catalan language from 1954 onwards, when the second edition was published.

During the decade of 1980s Catalan authors and writers began to ask the IEC to revise the dictionary, because they considered that the language had evolved quite a lot since the time of Fabra.

Towards the end of 1992 from within the IEC there arose a determination to publish a new standard dictionary. The project began immediately, with the economic support of the regional government, the Generalitat of Catalonia. The first edition of the new dictionary, the Dictionary of the Institute of Catalan Studies, was finished in December 1994 and published in September 1995. Shortly afterwards there were two reprints, which added, modified and removed a number of words.

On Saint George's Day, 2007, coinciding with the celebration of the centenary of the Institute of Catalan Studies, the second edition of the Dictionary of the Institute of Catalan Studies was presented, which, with the acronym DIEC2, has become the new standard reference. The "DIEC2" project was coordinated by the philologists Joan Martí i Castell, Carles Miralles i Solà and Joaquim Rafel i Fontanals. The number of entries increased from 120,000 to 132,460, as the work aspired to greater ideological neutrality and broadened the technical lexicon considerably. The new print version of 2007 was also published for the web, with consultation for free. From the start, both versions met with considerable success: 17,000 copies of the book were sold and 644,352 consultations via the internet were counted in the first two months after its appearance.

Since the publication of the second edition in April 2007 (DIEC2), the Philological Section of the IEC has continued to approve groups of amendments that have been incorporated into the on-line version and also into the print version in subsequent reprints:

- Amendments introduced into the second impression (November 2007).
- Amendments introduced into the paperback edition (March 2009).
- Amendments introduced into the on-line version (April 2011).
- Amendments entered in the on-line version (February 2013).

== Differences between the DGLC and the DIEC ==
The idea for a new dictionary arose due to the ever-larger differences between the lexicon employed in the DGLC and current usage. The project for the creation of the DIEC did not start from scratch, therefore, but began by building on the DGLC, and retained some of its features.

Apart from updating the lexicon, the main advances in the new dictionary are its size (it is a third larger than the DGLC), the way in which the articles are ordered and the perfecting of the spelling. In this last field the standardisation of affixes, the updating of the use of the hyphen and specific changes, for etymological reasons, in accenting and writing are worthy of note.

The DIEC has been further extended in the field of nomenclature and in the content of the articles. As for the lexicon, it has mostly expanded in the fields of science and technology and in dialectal words and slang. There are 30 more thematic areas than in its predecessor.
