= Maria Teresa Cabré =

Spanish linguist (1947-)

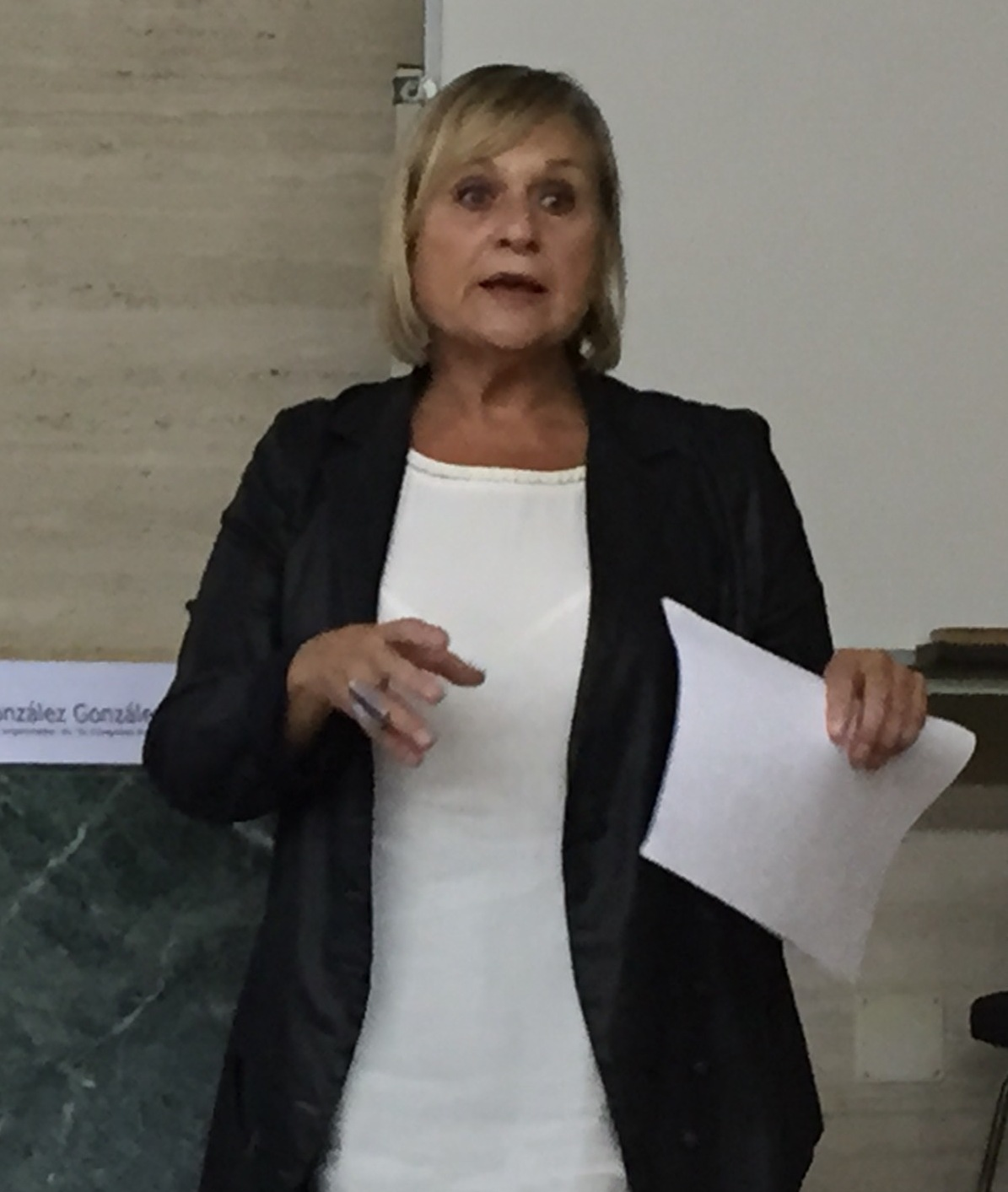
- Born: 10 February 1947; L'Argentera
- Education: University of Barcelona, University of Barcelona
- Occupations: Linguist; university teacher; philologist; romanist; translator
- Awards: Creu de Sant Jordi (2015); honorary degree (Ricardo Palma University, 2006); Narcís Monturiol Medal (1996); honorary degree (University of Vic - Central University of Catalonia, 2025)
- Academic career

Maria Teresa Cabré i Castellví (known as M. Teresa Cabré; born 1947) is a Catalan linguist. She is professor emeritus of Linguistics and Terminology at Pompeu Fabra University (UPF). Since 2021, she has been president of the Institute for Catalan Studies. Her areas of expertise are in lexicology, lexicography, terminology, and discourse analysis.

== Biography ==
Maria Teresa Cabré i Castellví was born in L'Argentera, Baix Camp, Catalonia, Spain, 1947.

She has a degree and doctorate in Romance philology (1976). She was a professor at the University of the Balearic Islands from 1970 to 1971, and at the University of Barcelona from 1971 to 1993. Since 1994, she has been teaching Linguistics and Terminology at UPF. She was director of TERMCAT from 1982 to 1988.

She directed the University Institute of Applied Linguistics at Pompeu Fabra University and is the current director of the Center of Reference in Linguistic Engineering (CREL) of the Catalan Research Plan. She is a founding member of the Iberoamerican Terminology Network (Riterm), of the Iberoamerican Terminology Network (Riterm) (also chair of its steering committee), of the Pan-Latin Terminology Network (Realiter), and of the lexicon group of the European Linguistic Research Association. Since 2019, she has been an International Member of the China Language Policy and Standardization Center. She is also a member of the advisory board of AET, Termnet, Terminology, Sendebar, and MOTS. As head of the Institute of Catalan Studies, she has proposed the creation of a normative pan-Catalan dictionary.

== Awards and honours ==
- 2007, Eugen Wüster International Terminology Award (Vienna)
- 2008, Knight, Ordre des Arts et des Lettres
- 2015, Creu de Sant Jordi
- 2018, Doctor honoris causa, University of Geneva
- Doctor honoris causa, Universidad Ricardo Palma, (Lima)

== Selected works ==
- Terminología y cognición, 1980
- Lexicologia i semàntica, 1985
- Els diccionaris catalans, de 1940 a 1988, 1991
- La terminologie théorie, méthode et applications, 1992
- Terminology : theory, methods, and applications, 1998
- Terminología y modelos culturales, 1999
- La terminología : representación y comunicación : elementos para una teoría de base comunicativa y otro artículos, 1999
- Textos de terminólogos de la Escuela Rusa, 2001
- La enseñanza de los lenguajes de especialidad : la simulación global, 2006
- Mots nous en català : una panoràmica geolectal = New words in Catalan : a diatopic view, 2014
- La Terminologia avui : termes, textos i aplicacions, 2018

== Sources ==
- "M. Teresa Cabré i Castellví". Universitat Pompeu Fabra (in Catalan).
- Duran, Enric (2008). "Maria Teresa Cabré: "Es posible entender el catalán con respeto, ganas y confianza"". El Periódico de Catalunya (in Spanish).
- "Maria Teresa Cabré i Castellví". Enciclopèdia Catalana (in Catalan). 2008.
