= Gausachs =

Gausachs is a surname of Catalan origin. Notable people with the surname include:

- Josep Gausachs (1889–1959), Catalan artist
- Marcel·lí Gausachs (1891–1931), Catalan photographer
