= Normes ortogràfiques =

List of rules regularizing Catalan spelling

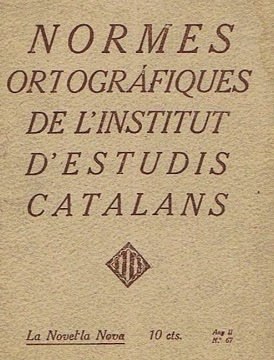
- Author: Institut d'Estudis Catalans
- Language: Catalan
- Publication date: January 24, 1913

The Normes ortogràfiques are a list of 24 rules which were promulgated by the Institut d’Estudis Catalans on January 24, 1913, with the purpose of regularizing Catalan spelling. They were made to establish a graphic codification for the Catalan language, which at the time did not have a system of unitary spelling.

These rules formed the basis for the spelling of modern Catalan, until the publication in 2017 of Ortografia catalana. They were published near the end of January 1913, and endorsed by the press. They were fully reproduced in the article "For the unit of the language. The Orthographic Norms of the Institute of Catalan Studies", published in La Veu de Catalunya on January 31, 1913 (p. 3-4).

== Goals and Process of Elaboration of the Rules ==
The authors' aim was to push the language to be as modernized and modular as other European languages –i.e. making it usable for all literary genres and communication throughout science, administration, education, legislation, commerce, and the press.

To establish this set of rules, the Institut d’Estudis Catalans (Institute of Catalan Studies) created a commission with members from all of its departments: Antoni Maria Alcover, Josep Carner i Ribalta, Frederic Clascar, Pompeu Fabra, Lluís Segalà i Estalella, Jaume Massó i Torrents, Miquel dels Sants Oliver, Antoni Rubió i Lluch, Pere Coromines i Montanya, and Eugenio d'Ors. Pompeu Fabra was in charge of preparing a proposal for the rules that was studied, debated, and voted on by the commission members. In creating these rules, they provided the Catalan language with the essential foundation for taking on subsequent codification efforts, a grammar (1918) and a dictionary (1932).

== Reactions to the rules ==
These rules were adopted almost immediately by the daily press and a wide range of magazines, as well as the majority of writers. The establishment of these rules also allowed for the teaching of Catalan in schools and universities. Enric Prat de la Riba called for the unity and discipline of the Catalan people in this matter and, because of that, local bodies decided to adopt the new spelling rules. The role of culture and politics was key for this success, which consequently led to the unity of the language and its recovery.

Despite this strong reception both at an official and a popular level, the rules were initially rejected by a non-discountable number of personalities. Amongst the people opposed to the norms were such scholars as Francesc Carreras i Candi, Jaume Collell i Bancells, Josep Franquesa i Gomis, Francesc Matheu i Fornells, Apel·les Mestres, Ramon Miquel i Planas, Ernest Moliné i Brasés, etc., who in 1915 created the Acadèmia de la Llengua Catalana (Catalan Language Academy) and wrote their own Regles ortogràfiques ("Orthographic Rules"), published in 1916, which did not spread.
