= L'Argentera =

- Municipality
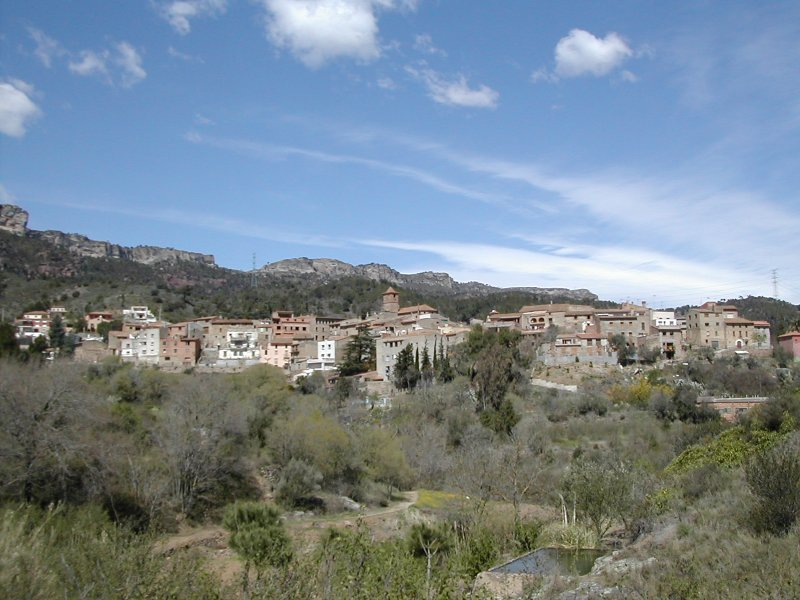
- L'Argentera

- Location in Catalonia
- Coordinates: 41°8′21″N 0°54′37″E
- Country: Spain
- Community: Catalonia
- Province: Tarragona
- Comarca: Baix Camp

Government
  - Mayor: Luís Maria Castellví Valls (2015)

Area
  - Total: 10.1 km^{2} (3.9 sq mi)

Population (2025-01-01)
  - Total: 139
  - Density: 13.8/km^{2} (35.6/sq mi)
- Website: www.argentera.cat

L'Argentera (Catalan pronunciation: [ləɾdʒənˈteɾə]) is a village in the province of Tarragona and autonomous community of Catalonia, Spain. It has a population of 139 (register office, 2025).

== Notable people ==
- Maria Teresa Cabré (born 1947), linguist
