= Marcel·lí Gausachs =

Catalan photographer

Marcel·lí Gausachs i Gausachs (1891–1931) was a Catalan photographer, from the northeast of Spain. Little is known of his life. He was a member of the photographic section of the Hiking Club of Catalonia. He specialised in stereoscopic photography, a technique in which two pictures are taken from slightly different positions; when looked at in a viewer which presents only one picture to each eye, this produces an illusion of 3D. His subject-matter was the architecture, landscape and human activity of Catalonia and Spain, and to a lesser extent of France and Belgium, in the early years of the 20th century. The Library of Catalonia holds 349 of his photographic plates (119 positives and 230 negatives) in the Memòria Digital de Catalunya as a historical resource.

== Gallery ==
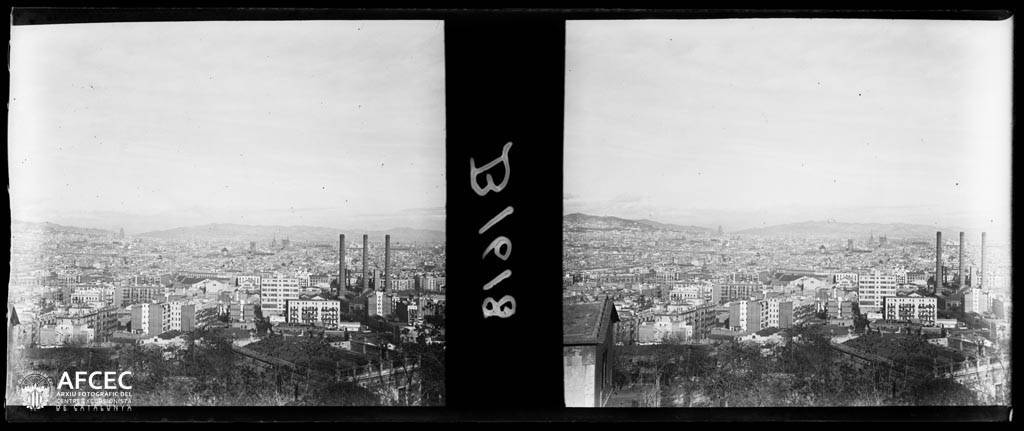
View of Barcelona from Montjuic, Catalonia

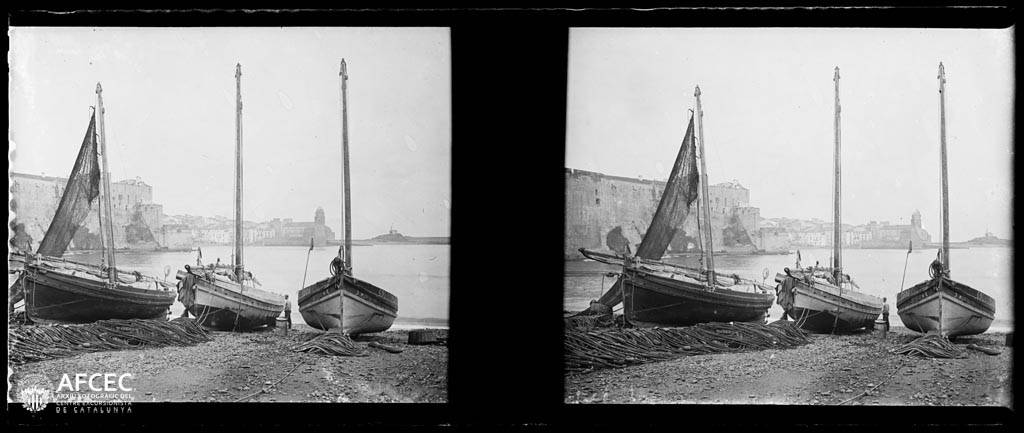
Boats on the beach at Cotlliure, Pyrénées-Orientales, southern France

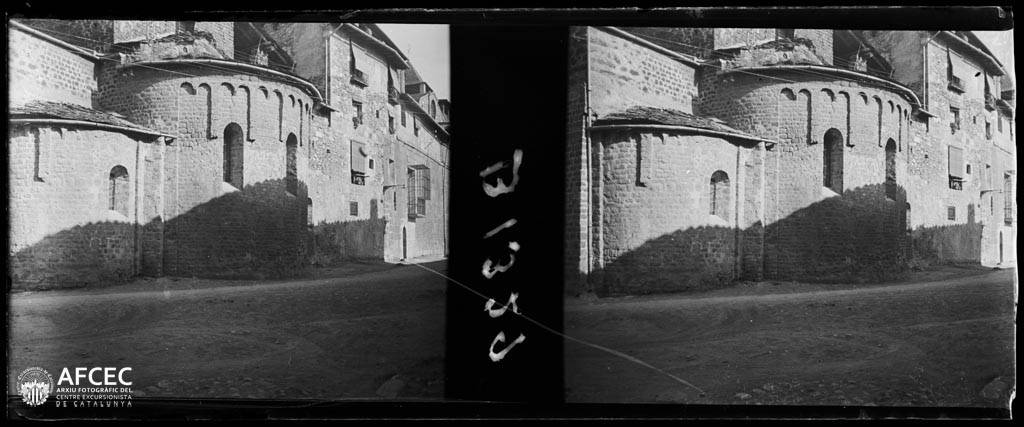
The church of Sant Miquel de la Seu d'Urgell, attached to La Seu d'Urgell Cathedral, Catalonia

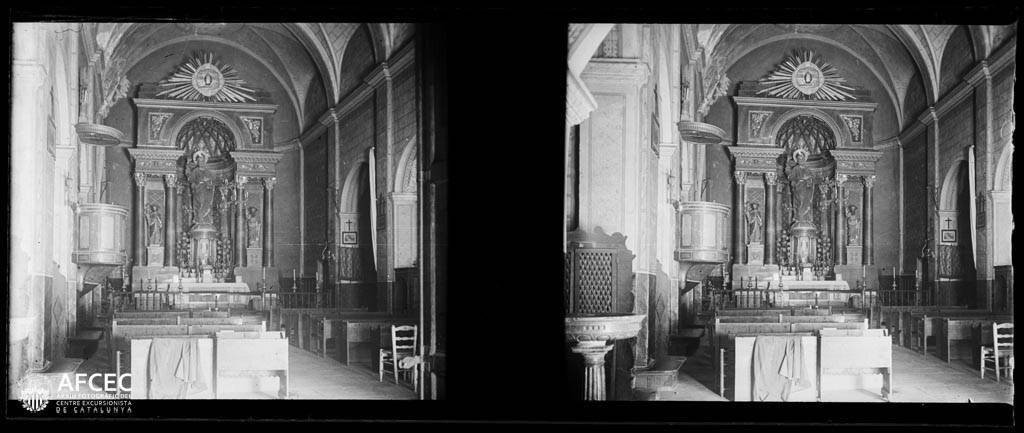
The high altar of Sant Pere d'Osor, Osor, Catalonia

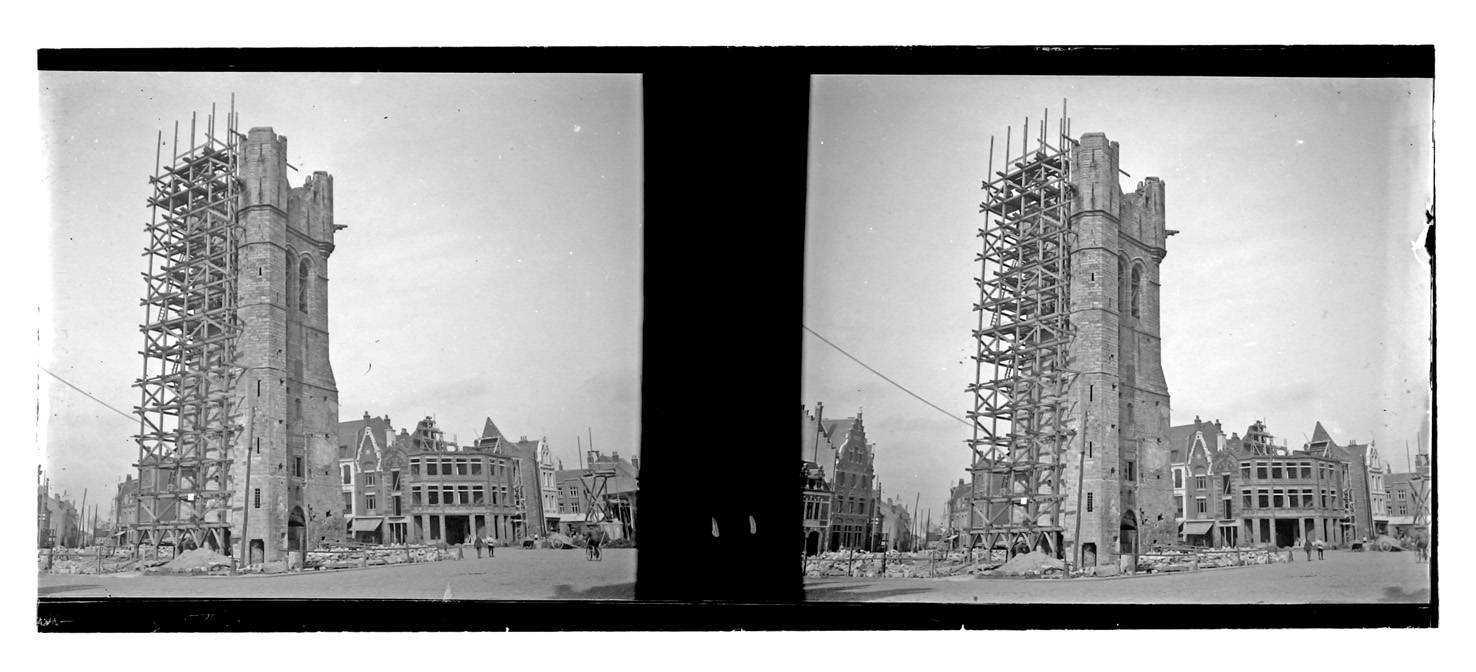
The Belfry of Béthune, Béthune, northern France, under restoration
