= Norberto Font y Sagué =

Spanish geologist, naturalist, and writer

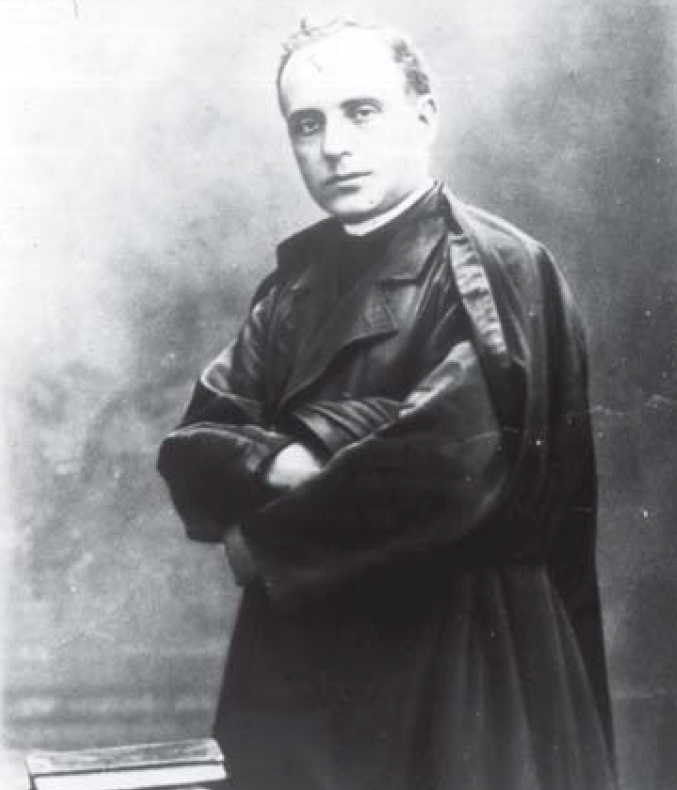
Norbert Font i Sagué.

Norberto Font y Sagué (17 September 1873 – 19 April 1910) was a Spanish geologist, speleologist, naturalist and writer. He was the introducer of caving in Spain.

== Biography ==
A priest since 1900, he initially devoted himself to literature and journalism. Later he studied geology, in 1904 he held the chair of geology at the Catalan University Studies and published a course on dynamic geology applied to Catalonia. With the sponsorship of the Centre Excursionista de Catalunya, he carried out a survey that allowed him to draw up the Speleological Catalogue of Catalonia. On the initiative of Font and Sagué, the large stone mammoth that exists in the Park of the Citadel of Barcelona was placed in December 1907. At that time, the Board of Natural Sciences was strengthened and the intention was to reproduce in stone all the great extinct species. The mammoth was built according to a model by the sculptor Miquel Dalmau.

As a writer, he wrote in Catalan and Spanish. He won prizes at the Floral Games in Barcelona, in 1894 with Les creus de pedra a Catalunya (The Stone Crosses in Catalonia) and in 1897 with Determinació de les comarques naturals i històriques de Catalunya (Determination of the natural and historical regions of Catalonia).

Other works by Font y Sagué were Pictures of the Sahara, The Geological Formation of the Rio de Oro, Spanish Sahara, Course on Dynamic Geology and Stratigraphy Applied to Catalonia (1905), History of Natural Sciences in Catalonia, from the IX to the XVIII Century (1908) and The Biblical Flood According to Geology (1909).

In his memory, the Catalan Federation of Speleology awards the "Norbert Font i Sagué" prize every year to the best speleological works carried out in Catalonia and Spain.
