= Diccionari General de la Llengua Catalana =

Diccionari general de la llengua catalana
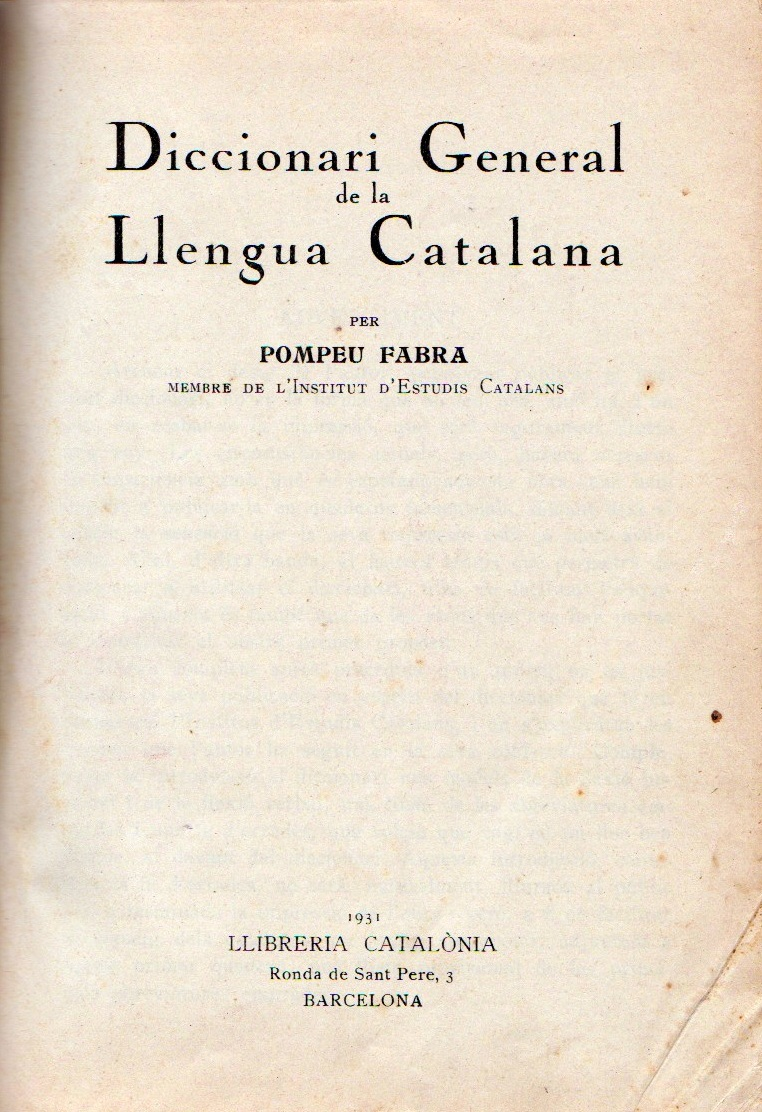
- Author: Pompeu Fabra
- Original title: Diccionari general de la llengua catalana
- Language: Catalan
- Subject: Dictionary
- Published: 1931 Llibreria Catalònia
- Publication place: Països Catalans
- Pages: [8], xvi, 1782, [1]
- OCLC: 230748970
- Dewey Decimal: 449.93
- LC Class: PC3889 .F3

The Diccionari General de la Llengua Catalana by Pompeu Fabra is a Catalan dictionary, first published in fascicles in 1931. It was the Standard Catalan dictionary until 1995, when the Institut d'Estudis Catalans published its Diccionari de la llengua catalana.

== History ==
The Institut d’Estudis Catalans (IEC) wanted to create an inventory of the Catalan language and asked a small commission, directed by Pompeu Fabra, to do so. Fabra had published a spelling dictionary (Diccionari ortogràfic) in 1917 based on the official orthographic rules (Normes ortogràfiques), in addition to other works aiming to codify the Catalan language.

Fabra created the dictionary during Primo de Rivera's dictatorship (1923–1930). The work was initially published as installments in 1931. On November 30, 1932, the book was published by Llibreria Catalònia.

The second edition of the book was issued in 1954 (after the author's death) and censored. Before 1994, 32 other editions of the book were published.

== Description ==
Fabra used a scientific method for the dictionary, which was spontaneously recognized by the scientific community. Aiming for a modern and genuine language, he refused to include certain unused regional or archaic words.

The sources of the work were, according to Fabra, other Catalan dictionaries, as well as the Dictionary of the Spanish Language, the Modem French Dictionary by Hatzfeld and Darmesteter, and the Webster's Dictionary. Moreover, he took into consideration other lexical compendiums such as Diccionari Aguiló, Butlletí de Dialectologia Catalana or other existing compendiums that were kept in the institute's lexicographical offices. He consulted with specialists so as to include some specific terminology and neologisms to the dictionary.
