= TERMCAT =

Catalan terminology center

TERMCAT is a public Catalan institution created in 1985 in order to ensure the development and integration of Catalan terminology for the preparation of terminological resources, standardization of terminology neologisms and advice on a regular and ongoing dialogue with users specialists. Since 1998, its terminology notices are obligatory in the scientific and technical publications of the public administration of the country. Neologisms are approved and published in the Official Journal Diari Oficial de la Generalitat de Catalunya.

It was created in Barcelona in 1985 as a joint initiative of the Ministry of Culture of the Generalitat of Catalonia and the Institute of Catalan Studies (IEC). Since 1994 the Consortium for Standardization language was added to the management of the consortium.

== Cercaterm ==
Cercaterm is an automated service for online multilingual consultations of TERMCAT with over 230,000 terminology entries available to the public. Anyone can consult the terms standardized by the TERMCAT Supervising Council, terminology products published since 1985, information from the centre's research projects, terms from consultations and projects in an advanced research phase, entries written by other entities and professionals and terminological criteria entries written by the centre.

The interface works as a multilingual thematic search engine which also enables terminology consultations of TERMCAT through a personalized service module. The suggestions and comments made by users are one of the sources for incorporating new entries into Cercaterm.

The entries include a reference that informs the users of the source of the information so they may assess the credibility of the data.

== Neoloteca ==
TERMCAT
- Website: Neoloteca

Neoloteca is an on-line dictionary of all neologisms that are created in Catalan and is approved by the Supervisory Council of TERMCAT in cooperation with the Institut d'Estudis Catalans. The aim of Neoloteca is to specify and define new terms in Catalan and to give their equivalences in other languages. The terms can relate to any area of human society and endeavor including science, art and culture, technology, business and commerce, sport, etc. The terms proposed are regarded as the correct forms for use in all areas of public administration in Catalonia.

By 1999 Neoloteca contained 6,000 terms that could be consulted using a theme-based index or alphabetical indexes in various languages. It regularly publishes updates in order to keep abreast of the latest developments in science and society in general. The update in January 2014 offered, among other things, a series of terms relating to manga culture and to the different hand movements made when operating mobile devices. New terms are always published in the Official Gazette of the Catalan Government.
