= Institute for Catalan Studies =

Catalan academic institution

Institute for Catalan Studies Institut d'Estudis Catalans

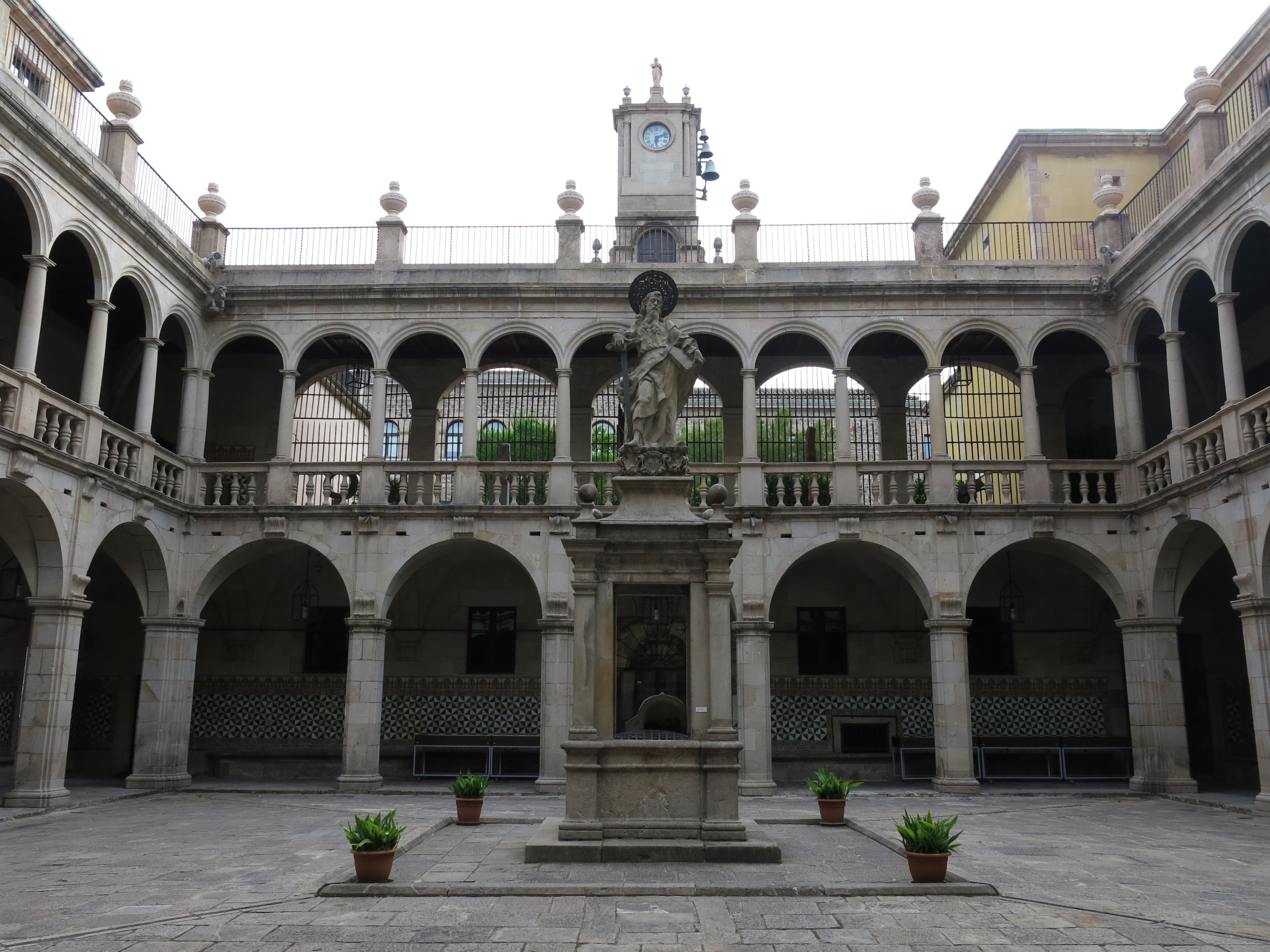
- Headquarters of the Institute
- Abbreviation: IEC
- Formation: 1907; 119 years ago
- Founder: Enric Prat de la Riba
- Headquarters: Carrer del Carme, 47, Barcelona
- President: Maria Teresa Cabré
- Website: www.iec.cat

The Institute for Catalan Studies (Catalan: Institut d'Estudis Catalans [instiˈtud dəsˈtuðis kətəˈlans]), also known by the acronym IEC, is Catalonia's national academy, an institution which seeks to undertake research and study into "all elements of Catalan culture". It is based in Barcelona, Catalonia, Spain.

== IEC ==
The IEC is known principally for its work in standardising the Catalan language. The Institute's current president is Joan Domènec Ros Aragonès, elected to the office for four years in 2013 and to a second term in 2017, following Salvador Giner, elected to the office for four years in 2005 and to a second term in 2009. The IEC is based in Barcelona, the capital of Catalonia, and the second largest city in Spain.

Enric Prat de la Riba, who was to become the first President of the Commonwealth of Catalonia, signed the founding document of the Institute, as president of the Provincial Deputation of Barcelona on 17 June 1907. The same year, the IEC published the first volume of the series Pintures murals catalanes by Josep Pijoan which made the most important series of Romanesque mural paintings known to the wider public (such as the paintings of Sant Quirze de Pedret, Sant Climent de Taull, etc.). The IEC is one of a number of cultural and scientific institutions created at that time to lend greater prestige to the Catalan language and culture; others include the Biblioteca de Catalunya (Library of Catalonia), the Escola Industrial (Industrial School), the Hiking Club of Catalonia, the Escola Superior de Belles Arts (Higher School of Fine Arts) and the Escola del Treball (School of Labour), el Centre de Recerca Matemàtica. Prat de la Riba also founded the Escola de l'Administració Local (School of Local Administration), in order to create a body of Catalan civil servants for the regional government.

The IEC was admitted to the Union Académique Internationale in 1922, shortly after the establishment of the latter.

During the dictatorship of Franco, along with many other Catalan cultural institutions, the Institut lived a semiclandestine existence, and was not officially restored to its previous status in the field of language standardisation until a 1991 bill was passed by the (also restored) Catalan Parliament.

The IEC inspired the creation of the Institut d'Estudis Occitans in Occitania. Occitania is an area in southern France where Occitan (often called Provençal) has historically been spoken.

== Philological Section ==
The IEC's Philological Section was founded in 1911. Antoni Maria Alcover served as its first president. Along with Pompeu Fabra, the Philological Section worked to establish a series of spelling norms that were approved by members in 1913. These became the foundation of modern written Catalan which are still in use today. Similarly, in 1917, the Diccionari Ortogràfic de l'Institut was published; it soon became a dictionary of spelling norms irredeemably tied to the reputation of former Institute Director Pompeu Fabra. The dictionary went through several editions, with the last released in 1937. This work and others were the basis of Fabra's Diccionari General de la Llengua Catalana published in 1932, a general-purpose dictionary that became a standard reference work throughout the various Catalan-speaking territories.

Officially the IEC provides standards for the language as a whole: the Philological Section has members from Catalonia proper, Northern Catalonia (located in France), the Balearic Islands, Valencia, Alghero in Sardinia and the Principality of Andorra (the only country where Catalan is the sole official language). However, the Valencian Region south of Catalonia has its own language academy, the Acadèmia Valenciana de la Llengua, which nevertheless formally acknowledges that theirs is one variant of the common language. In an area known as the Franja de Ponent, the eastern edge of Aragon adjacent to Catalonia where Catalan is spoken by about 44,000 inhabitants, the rules are followed de facto although Catalan is not an official language in that region.

Other IEC works of note include the Diccionari de la Llengua Catalana published in 1995, and the regionally sensitive Diccionari Català-Valencià-Balear (Catalan-Valencian-Balearic Dictionary). Notable members of the Philological Section include Josep Carner, Àngel Guimerà, Joan Maragall, and Aina Moll Marquès.

== Societat Catalana de Terminologia ==
The Societat Catalana de Terminologia (Catalan Terminology Society – SCATERM) is a subsidiary society of the Institut d'Estudis Catalans (Institute for Catalan Studies – IEC) which is attached to the latter's Philological Section and brings together all the organisations and professionals involved in Catalan terminology and disseminates terminological activities carried out in Catalan-speaking areas.

=== History of the Societat Catalana de Terminologia ===
The Societat Catalana de Terminologia was founded as the Associació Catalana de Terminologia (Catalan Terminology Association – ACATERM) following a proposal presented at the 1st Terminology and Language Services Conference on 18 May 2001 at Pompeu Fabra University (UPF). Under this initiative, a management committee consisting of members of various institutions in Catalan-speaking areas was responsible for steering the founding process. It was made up of representatives from the Unió de Federacions Esportives de Catalunya (Sports Federations Union of Catalonia – UFEC), the terminology centre TERMCAT, the Institut Universitari de Lingüística Aplicada (University Institute for Applied Linguistics – IULA) at the UPF and the language services at the Autonomous University of Barcelona, the Universitat Politècnica de Catalunya – BarcelonaTech and Jaume I University at Castelló.

=== Societat Catalana de Terminologia's goals ===
- Encourage the dissemination of terminology in Catalan in scientific and technical fields.
- Provide a platform for promoting the recognition and professionalisation of the field of terminology.
- Sponsor the provision and exchange of information about terminology activities between terminology users and professionals.
- Establish relationships with other organisations, associations and institutions which have similar purposes.
- Cooperate with the Philological Section and other IEC bodies in work and discussions related to the terminology of this institution.

=== Societat Catalana de Terminologia's activities ===
SCATERM regularly runs academic conferences, seminars and training courses. Every two months it publishes the electronic newsletter Butlletí de la Societat Catalana de Terminologia and every six months the terminology journal Terminàlia (as a hardcopy and online) which is both a specialist peer-reviewed scientific journal and also an informative magazine. It also publishes two collections created in 2009: "Memòries de la Societat Catalana de Terminologia", which features the proceedings of the most important events organised by the Society and in particular its annual conference, and "Eines de Terminologia", which includes monographs concerning the study and practice of terminology. In order to drive research into terminology, SCATERM holds a biennial award for students as part of the awards and scholarships given by the IEC called the Societat Catalana de Terminologia Award.
