= Voiced dental and alveolar trills =

Consonantal sounds represented by ⟨r⟩ in IPA

Voiced alveolar trill

r
- IPA number: 122

Audio sample
- source · help

Encoding
- Entity (decimal): &#114;
- Unicode (hex): U+0072
- X-SAMPA: r
- Braille: ⠗ (braille pattern dots-1235)
Image

A voiced alveolar trill is a type of consonantal sound used in some spoken languages. An alveolar trill is familiar to many people as the sound of an Italian ⟨r⟩ or Spanish ⟨rr⟩.

The symbol in the International Phonetic Alphabet that represents dental, alveolar, and postalveolar trills is ⟨r⟩. It is commonly called the rolled R, rolling R, or trilled R. Quite often, ⟨r⟩ is used in phonemic transcriptions (especially those found in dictionaries) of languages like English and German that have rhotic consonants that are not an alveolar trill. That is partly for ease of typesetting and partly because ⟨r⟩ is the letter used in the orthographies of such languages.

In many Indo-European languages, a trill may often be reduced to a single vibration in unstressed positions. In Italian, a simple trill typically displays only one or two vibrations, while a geminate trill will have three or more. Languages where trills always have multiple vibrations include Albanian, Spanish, Cypriot Greek, and a number of Armenian and Portuguese dialects.

People with ankyloglossia may find it exceptionally difficult to articulate the sound because of the limited mobility of their tongues.

== Features ==
Features of a voiced alveolar trill:

- Its manner of articulation is trill, which means it is produced by directing air over an articulator so that it vibrates.
- Its place of articulation may be:
  - dental (behind the upper front teeth),
  - alveolar (at the alveolar ridge), or
  - post-alveolar (behind the alveolar ridge).
- It is most often apical, which means it is pronounced with the tip of the tongue.
- Its phonation is voiced, which means the vocal cords vibrate during the articulation.
- It is an oral consonant, which means that air is not allowed to escape through the nose.
- It is a median consonant, which means it is produced by directing the airstream down the midline of the tongue, rather than to the sides.
- Its airstream mechanism is pulmonic, which means it is articulated by pushing air only with the intercostal muscles and abdominal muscles, as in most speech sounds.

== Occurrence ==
A trill extended for about 2 seconds, captured in slow motion to reveal the individual 36–44 Hz tongue oscillations.

=== Dental ===
Voiced dental trill

r̪

Language	Word	IPA	Meaning	Notes
Hungarian	arra	[ɒr̪ːɒ]	'that way'	Laminal dental. See Hungarian phonology
Marshallese	dik	[r̪ʲik]	'to be small'	Palatalized. The language's two other rhotic phonemes, /rˠ/ (velarized) and /rʷ/ (rounded), are post-alveolar.
Romanian	repede	[ˈr̪e̞pe̞d̪e̞]	'quickly'	Apical. See Romanian phonology
Russian	рьяный/ŕjaný	[ˈr̪ʲjän̪ɨ̞j]	'zealous'	Apical, palatalized. Usually only a single vibration, presumably due to the palatalization. It contrasts with a post-alveolar trill. See Russian phonology

=== Alveolar ===
Language		Word	IPA	Meaning	Notes
Afrikaans	Standard	rooi	[roːi̯]	'red'	May be a tap [ɾ] instead. See Afrikaans phonology
Arabic	Modern Standard	رأى/ra'á	[raʔaː]	'saw' (verb)	In free variation with [ɾ] by many speakers.
Aragonese		sotarraño	[sotaˈraɲo]	'basement'	Contrasts with /ɾ/.
Armenian	Eastern	ռումբ/ŕumb	[rumb]	'cannonball'	
Asturian		ferramienta	[feraˈmjẽŋta]	'tool'	Contrasts with /ɾ/.
Bengali		রাত/rat	[rat̪]	'night'	Very rare and mainly occurs word-initially. More commonly [ɾ ~ ɹ] for most speakers. See Bengali phonology
Breton		roue	[ruːe]	'king'	Dominant in and around Léon and Morbihan while many other dialects have adopted the voiced uvular fricative. See Breton phonology
Bulgarian		работа/rabota	[ˈrabotə]	'work'	See Bulgarian phonology
Chuvash		арăслан/araslan	[arəsˈlan]	'lion'	
Czech		registr	[rɛɡɪstr̩]	'register'	Contrasts with /r̝/; may be syllabic. See Czech phonology
Danish	Few older speakers of the Jutlandic dialect	regn	[ræjˀn]		Corresponds to much more back [ʁ ~ ʕ] in standard Danish. See Danish phonology
Dutch	Standard	raam	[raːm]	'window'	See Dutch phonology
English	Scottish	curd	[kʌrd]	'curd'	Only some dialects. Corresponds to [ɾ ~ ɹ] in others. See English phonology
English	Welsh	bright	[braɪt]	'bright'	Some dialects under Welsh influence. Corresponds to [ɾ ~ ɹ] in others.
Estonian		korrus	[ˈkorːus]	'floor'	See Estonian phonology
Finnish		raaka	[ˈrɑːkɑ]	'raw'	See Finnish phonology
Greek	Standard	άρτος/ártos	[ˈartos]	'artos'	Allophone of /ɾ/. Usual in clusters, otherwise a tap or an approximant. See Modern Greek phonology
Greek	Cypriot	βορράς/vorras	[vorˈras]	'north'	Contrasts with /ɾ/.
Hindustani	Hindi	पत्थर / patthar	[pət̪ːʰər]	'stone'	See Hindustani phonology
Hindustani	Urdu	پتھر / patthar	[pət̪ːʰər]	'stone'	See Hindustani phonology
Indonesian		getar	[gətar]	'vibrate'	See Indonesian phonology
Italian		terra	[ˈt̪ɛrːä]	'earth'	See Italian phonology
Japanese	Shitamachi dialect	から kara	[kara]	'from'	Allophone of /ɾ/. See Japanese phonology.
Japanese	Kansai dialect	から kara	[kara]	'from'	Allophone of /ɾ/. See Japanese phonology.
Kele		[ⁿrikei]		'leg'	
Kharia		[romoʔɖɖaʔ]		'tear'	
Khmer		ត្រី / trey	[trəj]	'fish' or 'three'	See Khmer phonology
Korean	Yukjin Korean	도틀/doteul	[to̞tʰɨr]	'patience'	Allophone of /l/. Influenced by Soviet presence in the Yukjin region.
Kyrgyz		ыр/ır	[ɯr]	'song'	
Latvian		rags	[räks̪]	'horn'	See Latvian phonology
Lithuanian		ir	[ɪr]	'and'	See Lithuanian phonology
Malay	Standard	کورڠ / kurang	[kuraŋ]	'less'	May be postalveolar approximant [ɹ̠], or more commonly, flap [ɾ]. Silent in word-final position for speakers of 'schwa-varieties'. See Malay phonology
Malay	Brunei	کورڠ / kurang	[kuraŋ]	'less'	Corresponds to /ɣ/ and /ʁ/ in other Malay varieties
Malay	Sabah	کورڠ / kurang	[kuraŋ]	'less'	Corresponds to /ɣ/ and /ʁ/ in other Malay varieties
Malayalam		പാറ/paara	[paːrɐ]	'rock'	See Malayalam phonology
Mandarin	Huguang Southwestern Mandarin	鋸子	[tɕy˦˩˨ r̩]	'saw'	Found in the suffix 子 in various localities, including by not limited to Chuandian (in Jingzhou), Zhongxiang, Yicheng, Jingmen, and Jiangling.
Nepali		घर्रा/ghórra	[ɡʱʌrːä]	'drawer'	See Nepali phonology
Persian	Standard	روز ruz	[ruːz]	'day'	Occurs word-initially and when geminated. In other positions, it is realized as a tap [ɾ]. See Persian phonology.
Polish		krok	[krɔk]	'step'	Usually realized as [ɾ]. See Polish phonology.
Portuguese		rato	[ratu]	'mouse'	Contrasts with /ɾ/. Many northern dialects retain the alveolar trill, and the trill is still dominant in rural areas. See Portuguese phonology and Guttural R.
Scots		bricht	[brɪçt]	'bright'	
Scottish Gaelic		ceàrr	[kʲaːrˠ]	'false'	Velarized. Pronounced as a trill at the beginning of a word, or as rr, or before consonants d, t, l, n, s; otherwise a voiced alveolar tap. Contrasts with /ɾʲ/ and /ɾ/ intervocally and word-finally. See Scottish Gaelic phonology
Serbo-Croatian		рт / rt	[r̩t]	'cape'	May be syllabic. See Serbo-Croatian phonology
Slovak		krk	[kr̩k]	'neck'	May be a tap, particularly when not syllabic.
Slovene		riž	[ríːʃ]	'rice'	Also described as tap [ɾ], and variable between trill [r] and tap [ɾ]. See Slovene phonology
Spanish		perro	[ˈpe̞ro̞]	'dog'	Contrasts with /ɾ/. See Spanish phonology
Swedish	Some West coast and Northern dialects	bra	[brɑː]	'good'	See Swedish phonology
Tagalog		rambutan	[rɐmbuˈtan]	'rambutan'	Allophone of the more common [ɾ], especially with more conservative speakers. See Tagalog phonology
Tamil		பறவை/paravai	[paraʋaɪ̯]	'bird'	See Tamil phonology
Thai	Standard	ชลบุรี/chonbùri	[tɕ͡ʰōn.bù.rīː]	'Chonburi'	
Titan		[ⁿrakeiʔin]		'girls'	
Ukrainian		рух/rukh	[rux]	'motion'	See Ukrainian phonology
Welsh		Rhagfyr	[ˈr̥aɡvɨr]	'December'	Contrasts with the voiceless alveolar trill, /r̥/. See Welsh phonology
Wu Chinese	Xuanzhou Wu (Qiugong locality)	弟	[ri˥˧]	'younger brother'	Found in various Xuanzhou localities, with that of Qiugong residential community, Shuiyang township, Xuanzhou District, Xuanzhou prefecture provided. Equivalent to /d/ in other Wu varieties (cf. Shanghainese [di˩˦]).
Yiddish	Standard	בריק/brik	[brɪk]	'bridge'	More commonly a flap [ɾ]; can be uvular [ɢ̆ ~ ʀ] instead. See Yiddish phonology
Zapotec	Tilquiapan	r-ree	[rɘˀɘ]	'go out (habitually)'	Underlyingly sequence of two /ɾ/.

=== Post-alveolar ===
Voiced postalveolar trill

r̠

Audio sample
- source · help

Language	Word	IPA	Meaning	Notes
Catalan	ruc	[ˈr̺uk]	'donkey'	Apical. Contrasts with /ɾ/. See Catalan phonology
Gokana	bele	[bēr̠ē]	'we'	Allophone of /l/, medially between vowels within the morpheme, and finally in the morpheme before a following vowel in the same word. It can be a postalveolar tap or simply [l] instead.
Marshallese	raj	[r̠ˠɑtʲ]	'whale'	/rˠ/ is velarized and /rʷ/ is rounded. Another rhotic phoneme in the language, /rʲ/, is dental and palatalized.
Marshallese	roj	[r̠ʷɔtʲ]	'ebb tide'	/rˠ/ is velarized and /rʷ/ is rounded. Another rhotic phoneme in the language, /rʲ/, is dental and palatalized.
Russian	играть/igrať	[ɪˈɡr̠ätʲ]	'to play'	Contrasts with a palatalized dental trill. See Russian phonology

=== Variable ===
Language		Word	IPA	Meaning	Notes
German	Standard (chiefly areas with Upper German or Low German influence as well as immigrant speakers)	Schmarrn	[ʃmarn]	'nonsense'	Varies between apical dental and apical alveolar; may be a tap instead. See Standard German phonology

== Fricative trill ==
Voiced alveolar fricative trill

r̝

r̻
- IPA number: 122 429

Audio sample
- source · help

Encoding
- X-SAMPA: r_r

In Czech, there are two contrasting alveolar trills. Besides the typical apical trill, written r, there is another laminal trill, written ř, in words such as rybáři [ˈrɪbaːr̝ɪ] 'fishermen' and the common surname Dvořák. Its manner of articulation is similar to [r] but is laminal and the body of the tongue is raised. It is thus partially fricative, with the frication sounding rather like [ʒ] but less retracted. It sounds like a simultaneous [r] and [ʒ], and some speakers tend to pronounce it as [rʐ], [ɾʒ], or [ɹʒ]. In the IPA, it is typically written as ⟨r⟩ plus the raising diacritic, ⟨r̝⟩, but it has also been written as laminal ⟨r̻⟩. (Before the 1989 IPA Kiel Convention, it had a dedicated symbol ⟨ɼ⟩.) The Kobon language of Papua New Guinea also has a fricative trill, but the degree of frication is variable. The Kpwe language of Cameroon has been reported to have a similar sound.

=== Features ===
Features of the voiced alveolar fricative trill:

- Its manner of articulation is fricative trill, which means it is a non-sibilant fricative and a trill pronounced simultaneously.
- Its place of articulation is laminal alveolar, which means it is articulated with the blade of the tongue at the alveolar ridge.
- Its phonation is voiced, which means the vocal cords vibrate during the articulation.
- It is an oral consonant, which means that air is not allowed to escape through the nose.
- It is a median consonant, which means it is produced by directing the airstream down the midline of the tongue, rather than to the sides.
- Its airstream mechanism is pulmonic, which means it is articulated by pushing air only with the intercostal muscles and abdominal muscles, as in most speech sounds.

=== Examples ===
Language		Word	IPA	Meaning	Notes
Choni					May also be realized [ʐ].
Czech		čtyři	[ˈt͡ʃtɪr̝ɪ]	'four'	Contrasts with /r/ and /ʒ/. May be a non-sibilant fricative. See Czech phonology
Dzongkha		རུ་ཏོག་/ru-tog	[r̝uto]	'bone'	Usually released as a normal trilled [r], sometimes it has a slightly fricative character vaguely reminiscent of Czech ř. Dzongkha r is followed by the low register tone.
Kashubian		rzéka	[r̝eka]	'river'	Only some northern and northwestern speakers. Formerly common over the whole speaking area.
Ormuri	Standard (Kaniguram)	تڒګب/tařgab	[tɑr̝geb]	'summer'	Corresponds to /ʃ/ in Logar dialect.
Polish	Some dialects	rzeka	[r̝ɛka]	'river'	Contrasts with /r/ and /ʐ/. Present in areas from Starogard Gdański to Malbork and those south, west and northwest of them, area from Lubawa to Olsztyn to Olecko to Działdowo, south and east of Wieleń, around Wołomin, southeast of Ostrów Mazowiecka and west of Siedlce, from Brzeg to Opole and areas to the north, and roughly from Racibórz to Nowy Targ. Most speakers, as well as standard Polish, merge it with /ʐ/, and speakers maintaining the distinction (which is mostly the elderly) sporadically do as well. See Polish phonology
Portuguese	European	os rins	[u ˈr̝ĩʃ]	'the kidneys'	Possible realization of the sequence /sr/ for speakers who realize /r/ as [r]. See Portuguese phonology
Silesian	Gmina Istebna	umrził	[ˈumr̝iw]	'(he) died'	Contrasts with /r/ and /ʒ/. Merges with /ʐ/ in most Polish dialects.
Silesian	Jablunkov				Contrasts with /r/ and /ʒ/. Merges with /ʐ/ in most Polish dialects.
Slovak	Northern dialects	řyka	[ˈr̝ɪkä]	'river'	Only in a few dialects near the Polish border. See Slovak phonology
Spanish		rana	[ˈr̝änä]	'frog'	Possible realization of /r/ in some dialects, may also be realized as a non-sibilant alveolar fricative [ɹ̝-] or as a sibilant retroflex fricative [ʐ].
Chicahuaxtla Trique		raꞌa	[rᶾa˧ʔaː˧] or [r̥ᶴa˧ʔaː˧]	'hand'	Initial allophone of /r/.
Tsakonian		ρζινοδίτζη	[r̝inoðitɕi]	'justice of the peace'	/ʒ/ appears to have been a fricative trill in the 19th century, and [ʒ] survived latterly only in women's usage in Southern Tsakonian.

== See also ==
- Index of phonetics articles

== Notes ==
Place →	Labial					Coronal										Dorsal					Laryngeal			
Manner ↓	Bilabial		Labiodental		Linguolabial		Dental		Alveolar		Postalveolar		Retroflex		(Alveolo-)palatal		Velar		Uvular		Pharyngeal/epiglottal		Glottal	
Nasal	m̥	m	ɱ̊	ɱ		n̼	n̪̊	n̪	n̥	n	n̠̊	n̠	ɳ̊	ɳ	ɲ̊	ɲ	ŋ̊	ŋ	ɴ̥	ɴ				
Plosive	p	b	p̪	b̪	t̼	d̼	t̪	d̪	t	d			ʈ	ɖ	c	ɟ	k	ɡ	q	ɢ	ʡ		ʔ	
Sibilant affricate							t̪s̪	d̪z̪	ts	dz	t̠ʃ	d̠ʒ	tʂ	dʐ	tɕ	dʑ								
Non-sibilant affricate	pɸ	bβ	p̪f	b̪v			t̪θ	d̪ð	tɹ̝̊	dɹ̝	t̠ɹ̠̊˔	d̠ɹ̠˔			cç	ɟʝ	kx	ɡɣ	qχ	ɢʁ	ʡʜ	ʡʢ	ʔh	
Sibilant fricative							s̪	z̪	s	z	ʃ	ʒ	ʂ	ʐ	ɕ	ʑ								
Non-sibilant fricative	ɸ	β	f	v	θ̼	ð̼	θ	ð	θ̠	ð̠	ɹ̠̊˔	ɹ̠˔	ɻ̊˔	ɻ˔	ç	ʝ	x	ɣ	χ	ʁ	ħ	ʕ	h	ɦ
Approximant		β̞		ʋ				ð̞		ɹ		ɹ̠		ɻ		j		ɰ						˷
Tap/flap		ⱱ̟		ⱱ					ɾ̥	ɾ			ɽ̊	ɽ						ɢ̆		ʡ̆		
Trill	ʙ̥	ʙ							r̥	r		r̠	ɽ̊r̥	ɽr					ʀ̥	ʀ	ʜ	ʢ		
Lateral affricate									tɬ	dɮ			tꞎ	d𝼅	c𝼆	ɟʎ̝	k𝼄	ɡʟ̝						
Lateral fricative							ɬ̪		ɬ	ɮ			ꞎ	𝼅	𝼆	ʎ̝	𝼄	ʟ̝						
Lateral approximant								l̪	l̥	l		l̠	ɭ̊	ɭ	ʎ̥	ʎ	ʟ̥	ʟ		ʟ̠				
Lateral tap/flap									ɺ̥	ɺ			𝼈̊	𝼈		ʎ̆		ʟ̆						

		BL	LD	D	A	PA	RF	P	V	U
Implosive	Voiced	ɓ			ɗ		ᶑ	ʄ	ɠ	ʛ
Implosive	Voiceless	ɓ̥			ɗ̥		ᶑ̊	ʄ̊	ɠ̊	ʛ̥
Ejective	Stop	pʼ			tʼ		ʈʼ	cʼ	kʼ	qʼ
Ejective	Affricate		p̪fʼ	tθʼ	tsʼ	tʃʼ	tʂʼ	tɕʼ	kxʼ	qχʼ
Ejective	Fricative	ɸʼ	fʼ	θʼ	sʼ	ʃʼ	ʂʼ	ɕʼ	xʼ	χʼ
Ejective	Lateral affricate				tɬʼ			c𝼆ʼ	k𝼄ʼ	q𝼄ʼ
Ejective	Lateral fricative				ɬʼ					
Click (top: velar; bottom: uvular)	Tenuis	kʘ qʘ		kǀ qǀ	kǃ qǃ		k𝼊 q𝼊	kǂ qǂ		
Click (top: velar; bottom: uvular)	Voiced	ɡʘ ɢʘ		ɡǀ ɢǀ	ɡǃ ɢǃ		ɡ𝼊 ɢ𝼊	ɡǂ ɢǂ		
Click (top: velar; bottom: uvular)	Nasal	ŋʘ ɴʘ		ŋǀ ɴǀ	ŋǃ ɴǃ		ŋ𝼊 ɴ𝼊	ŋǂ ɴǂ	ʞ	
Click (top: velar; bottom: uvular)	Tenuis lateral				kǁ qǁ					
Click (top: velar; bottom: uvular)	Voiced lateral				ɡǁ ɢǁ					
Click (top: velar; bottom: uvular)	Nasal lateral				ŋǁ ɴǁ					
