= Voiced postalveolar affricate =

Consonantal sound

dʒ

d̠ʒ

ʤ
- IPA number: 104 134

Audio sample
- source · help

Encoding
- Entity (decimal): &#100;&#800;&#658;
- Unicode (hex): U+0064 U+0320 U+0292
- X-SAMPA: d_Z or dZ
Image

A voiced palato-alveolar sibilant affricate, voiced post-alveolar affricate, or voiced domed postalveolar sibilant affricate is a type of consonantal sound, used in some spoken languages. It is familiar to English-speakers as the "j" sound in "jump".

This sound is transcribed in the International Phonetic Alphabet with ⟨d͡ʒ⟩, ⟨d͜ʒ⟩, ⟨dʒ⟩, or in some broad transcriptions ⟨ɟ⟩ (though this is the symbol for a voiced palatal plosive). There is also a ligature ⟨ʤ⟩, which has been retired by the International Phonetic Association but is still used. Alternatives used in the Americanist tradition are ⟨ǰ⟩, ⟨ǧ⟩, ⟨ǯ⟩ and ⟨dž⟩.

== Features ==
Features of a voiced postalveolar affricate:

- Its manner of articulation is sibilant affricate, which means it is produced by first stopping the air flow entirely, then directing it with the tongue to the sharp edge of the teeth, causing high-frequency turbulence.
- Its place of articulation is postalveolar, which means it is articulated with the tip or blade of the tongue behind the alveolar ridge.
- Its phonation is voiced, which means the vocal cords vibrate during the articulation.
- It is an oral consonant, which means that air is not allowed to escape through the nose.
- It is a median consonant, which means it is produced by directing the airstream down the midline of the tongue, rather than to the sides.
- Its airstream mechanism is pulmonic, which means it is articulated by pushing air only with the intercostal muscles and abdominal muscles, as in most speech sounds.

== Occurrence ==
Language		Word	IPA	Meaning	Notes
Abkhaz		аџь	[ad͡ʒ]	'oak'	See Abkhaz phonology
Adyghe		джанэ	[d͡ʒaːna]	'dress'	
Albanian		xham	[d͡ʒam]	'glass'	
Amharic		እንጀራ	[ɨnd͡ʒəra]	'injera'	
Arabic	Modern Standard	جَـرَس	[d͡ʒaras]	'bell'	In other standards and dialects, corresponds to [ɡ] or [ʒ]. See Arabic phonology
Arabic	Hejazi	جــيب/jēb	[d͡ʒe̞ːb]	'pocket'	Pronounced [ʒ] by some speakers. See Hejazi Arabic phonology
Armenian	Eastern	ջուր	[d͡ʒuɾ]	'water'	
Armenian	Western	ճանճ	[d͡ʒɑnd͡ʒ]	'musca (fly)'	
Assyrian		ܓ̰ܝܪܐ s	[d͡ʒjɑɾɑ]	'to pee'	Used in native terminology. Used predominantly in Urmia and some Jilu dialects. [ɟ] is used in other varieties.
Azerbaijani		can	[d͡ʒɑn]	'soul'	
Bengali		জল	[d͡ʒɔl]	'water'	Contrasts with the aspirated form. See Bengali phonology
Bulgarian		джудже	[d͡ʒʊˈd͡ʒɛ]	'dwarf'	See Bulgarian phonology
Catalan	Some speakers	mitjà	[mi̞(d)ˈd͡ʒa]	'means'	Its pronunciation varies between an alveolo-palatal [d͡ʑ] and a postalveolar [d͡ʒ] fricative. See Catalan phonology
Catalan	Some Valencian speakers	joc	[ˈd͡ʒɒ̝k]	'game'	Its pronunciation varies between an alveolo-palatal [d͡ʑ] and a postalveolar [d͡ʒ] fricative. See Catalan phonology
Chechen		джерво / jyerwo	[d͡ʒjerwo]	'previously married woman'	
Chinese	Quzhou dialect	重 / zon	[d͡ʒõ]	'heavy'	
Coptic		ϫⲉ/je	[d͡ʒe]	'that'	
Czech		džbán	[d͡ʒbaːn]	'jug'	See Czech phonology
Dhivehi		ޖަރާސީމު / jarásímu	[d͡ʒaraːsiːmu]	'germs'	See Dhivehi phonology
Dutch		jeans	[d͡ʒiːns]	'jeans'	Some say [ʒiːns]. Occurs mainly in loanwords.
English		jeans	[ˈd͡ʒiːnz]	'jeans'	See English phonology
Esperanto		manĝaĵo	[manˈd͡ʒaʒo̞]	'food'	See Esperanto phonology
Estonian		džäss	[ˈd̥ʒæsː]	'jazz'	Rare, occurs only in loanwords. See Estonian phonology
Finnish		džonkki	[ˈdʒo̞ŋkːi]	'junk (ship)'	Rare, occurs only in loanwords. See Finnish phonology
French		adjonction	[ad͡ʒɔ̃ksjɔ̃]	'addition'	Rare. Also occurs in loanwords. See French phonology
Georgian		ჯიბე/jibe	[d͡ʒibɛ]	'pocket'	
German	Standard	Dschungel	[ˈd͡ʒʊŋəl]	'jungle'	Laminal or apico-laminal and strongly labialized. Some speakers may merge it with /t͡ʃ/. Occurs mainly in loanwords. See Standard German phonology
Goemai			[d͡ʒaːn]	'twins'	
Hebrew	Standard	ג׳וק/juk	[d͡ʒuk]	'cockroach'	Only used in loanwords. See Modern Hebrew phonology
Hebrew	Temani	גָּדוֹל/jaďol	[d͡ʒaðol]	'big, great'	Yemenite Hebrew pronunciation of gimel with dageš. See Yemenite Hebrew
Hindustani	Hindi	जाना/jānā	[d͡ʒäːnäː]	'to go'	Contrasts with aspirated form. See Hindustani phonology
Hindustani	Urdu	جـانا/jānā	[d͡ʒäːnäː]	'to go'	Contrasts with aspirated form. See Hindustani phonology
Hungarian		lándzsa	[laːnd͡ʒɒ]	'spear'	Rare, mostly in loanwords. See Hungarian phonology
Indonesian		jarak	[ˈd͡ʒaraʔ]	'distance'	
Irish		jíp	[dʒiːpʲ]	'jeep'	Only used in loanwords. (loan consonant) See Irish phonology
Italian		gemma	[ˈd͡ʒɛmma]	'gem'	[dʒ] occurs when letter 'G' is before front vowels [e], [i] and [ɛ], while when 'G' is in front of vowels [o], [a], [u] and [ɔ] the phoneme changes to a voiced velar plosive.
Kabyle		lǧiran	[id͡ʒiræn]	'the neighbors'	
Kashmiri		جانوَر	[d͡ʒaːnʋar]	'animal'	
Kashubian		dłudżi	[ˈdwu.d͡ʒi]	'long'	
Khortha		जओनअइर	[d͡ʒonʱair]	'maize'	
Kurdish	Northern	cîger	[d͡ʒiːˈɡɛɾ]	'lung'	See Kurdish phonology
Kurdish	Central	جــەرگ	[d͡ʒɛɾg]	'liver'	See Kurdish phonology
Kurdish	Southern	جــەرگ	[d͡ʒæɾg]	'liver'	See Kurdish phonology
Kyrgyz		жаман / caman	[d͡ʒaman]	'bad'	See Kyrgyz phonology
Ladino		djudyó/גﬞודיו	[d͡ʒudˈjo]	'Jew'	
Latvian		dadži	[dad͡ʒi]	'thistles'	See Latvian phonology
Limburgish	Hasselt dialect	djèn	[d͡ʒɛːn²]	'Eugene'	See Hasselt dialect phonology
Lithuanian		džiaugsmingas	[d͡ʒɛʊɡʲsʲˈmʲɪnɡɐs]	'gladsome'	See Lithuanian phonology
Macedonian		џемпер/džemper	[ˈd͡ʒɛmpɛr]	'sweater'	See Macedonian phonology
Malay		jahat	[d͡ʒahat]	'evil'	
Malayalam		ജീവൻ/jeevan	[d͡ʒiːʋɐn]	'life'	See Malayalam phonology
Maltese		ġabra	[d͡ʒab.ra]	'collection'	
Manchu		ᠵᡠᠸᡝ/juwe	[d͡ʒuwe]	'two'	
Marathi		जय/jay	[d͡ʒəj]	'victory'	Contrasts with the aspirated form. Allophone [dʑ] and [d̪z]. See Marathi phonology
Occitan	Languedocien	jove	[ˈd͡ʒuβe]	'young'	See Occitan phonology
Occitan	Provençal	jove	[ˈd͡ʒuve]	'young'	See Occitan phonology
Odia		ଜମି/jami	[d͡ʒɔmi]	'land'	Contrasts with aspirated form.See Odia phonology
Ojibwe		iijikiwenh	[iːd͡ʒikiwẽːʔ]	'brother'	See Ojibwe phonology
Pashto		جــګ/jeg	[d͡ʒeɡ]	'high'	
Persian		کـجـا/koja	[kod͡ʒɒ]	'where'	See Persian phonology
Polish	Standard	liczba	[ˈlid͡ʐ.ba]	'number'	
Polish	Gmina Istebna	dziwny	[ˈd͡ʒivn̪ɘ]	'strange'	/ɖ͡ʐ/ and /d͡ʑ/ merge into [d͡ʒ] in these dialects. In standard Polish, /d͡ʒ/ is commonly used to transcribe what actually is a laminal voiced retroflex affricate.
Polish	Lubawa dialect	dziwny	[ˈd͡ʒivn̪ɘ]	'strange'	/ɖ͡ʐ/ and /d͡ʑ/ merge into [d͡ʒ] in these dialects. In standard Polish, /d͡ʒ/ is commonly used to transcribe what actually is a laminal voiced retroflex affricate.
Polish	Malbork dialect	dziwny	[ˈd͡ʒivn̪ɘ]	'strange'	/ɖ͡ʐ/ and /d͡ʑ/ merge into [d͡ʒ] in these dialects. In standard Polish, /d͡ʒ/ is commonly used to transcribe what actually is a laminal voiced retroflex affricate.
Polish	Ostróda dialect	dziwny	[ˈd͡ʒivn̪ɘ]	'strange'	/ɖ͡ʐ/ and /d͡ʑ/ merge into [d͡ʒ] in these dialects. In standard Polish, /d͡ʒ/ is commonly used to transcribe what actually is a laminal voiced retroflex affricate.
Polish	Warmia dialect	dziwny	[ˈd͡ʒivn̪ɘ]	'strange'	/ɖ͡ʐ/ and /d͡ʑ/ merge into [d͡ʒ] in these dialects. In standard Polish, /d͡ʒ/ is commonly used to transcribe what actually is a laminal voiced retroflex affricate.
Portuguese	Most Brazilian dialects	grande	[ˈɡɾɐ̃d͡ʒ(i)]	'big'	Allophone of /d/ before /i, ĩ/ (including when the vowel is elided) and other instances of [i] (e.g. epenthesis), marginal sound otherwise.
Portuguese	Most dialects	jambalaya	[d͡ʒɐ̃bɐˈlajɐ]	'jambalaya'	In free variation with /ʒ/ in a few recent loanwords. See Portuguese phonology
Romanian		ger	[ˈd͡ʒɛ̝r]	'frost'	See Romanian phonology
Sardinian	Campidanese	géneru	[ˈd͡ʒɛneru]	'son-in-law'	
Scottish Gaelic		Dia	[d͡ʒia]	'God'	See Scottish Gaelic phonology
Serbo-Croatian	Some speakers	џем / džem	[d͡ʒê̞m]	'jam'	May be laminal retroflex instead, depending on the dialect. See Serbo-Croatian phonology
Serbo-Croatian	Bosnian	ђаво / đavo	[d͡ʑâ̠ʋo̞ː]	'devil'	Most Croatian and some Bosnian speakers merge /d͡ʒ/ and /d͡ʑ/, either to [d͡ʒ] or retroflex [ɖ͡ʐ].
Serbo-Croatian	Croatian	ђаво / đavo	[d͡ʑâ̠ʋo̞ː]	'devil'	Most Croatian and some Bosnian speakers merge /d͡ʒ/ and /d͡ʑ/, either to [d͡ʒ] or retroflex [ɖ͡ʐ].
Silesian	Gmina Istebna				These dialects merge /ɖ͡ʐ/ and /d͡ʑ/ into [d͡ʒ].
Silesian	Jablunkov				These dialects merge /ɖ͡ʐ/ and /d͡ʑ/ into [d͡ʒ].
Slovene		enačba	[eˈnáːd͡ʒbà]	'equation'	Allophone of /t͡ʃ/ before voiced obstruents in native words. As a phoneme present only in loanwords. See Slovene phonology
Somali		joog	[d͡ʒoːɡ]	'stop'	See Somali phonology
Spanish		conllevar	[kondʒeˈβaɾ]	'carry'	Rare, more commonly [ʝ], [ɟʝ], or [ʒ]. See Spanish phonology, Yeísmo.
Tagalog		diyan	[d͡ʒän]	'there'	Used to pronounce the multigraphs ⟨dy⟩ and ⟨diy⟩ in native words and ⟨j⟩ in loanwords outside Spanish. For more information, see Tagalog phonology.
Tamil		இஞ்சி	[in̠ʲd͡ʒi]	'ginger'	Allophone of /tʃ/ after /ɲ/ natively; also occurs in loans, but the standard form tends to merge to /s/ or /tʃ/ elsewhere. See Tamil phonology.
Tatar	Mishar Dialect	can / җан	[d͡ʒɑn]	'soul'	In standard Tatar (Kazan dialect), the sound for letter <c/җ> is [ʑ].
Turkish		acı	[äˈd͡ʒɯ]	'pain'	See Turkish phonology
Turkmen		jar	[d͡ʒär]	'ravine'	
Tyap		jem	[d͡ʒem]	'hippopotamus'	
Ubykh		amcan	[amd͡ʒan]		See Ubykh phonology
Ukrainian		джерело/džerelo	[d͡ʒɛrɛˈlɔ]	'source'	See Ukrainian phonology
Uyghur		coza / جوزا	[d͡ʒozɑ]	'desk'	See Uyghur phonology
Uzbek		jahon / жаҳон	[d͡ʒaˈhɒn]	'world'	
Welsh		siop jips	[ʃɔp d͡ʒɪps]	'chip shop'	Occurs as the colloquial soft mutation of /t͡ʃ/. See Colloquial Welsh morphology
West Frisian		siedzje	[ˈʃɪd͡ʒə]	'to sow'	See West Frisian phonology
Yiddish		דזשוכע/juche	[d͡ʒʊxə]	'insect'	See Yiddish phonology
Zapotec	Tilquiapan	dxan	[d͡ʒaŋ]	'god'	

== Voiced postalveolar non-sibilant affricate ==
Voiced postalveolar non-sibilant affricate

d̠ɹ̝

dɹ̠᷵

Audio sample
- source · help

=== Features ===
- Its manner of articulation is affricate, which means it is produced by first stopping the airflow entirely, then allowing air flow through a constricted channel at the place of articulation, causing turbulence.
- Its place of articulation is postalveolar, which means it is articulated with either the tip or the blade of the tongue behind the alveolar ridge.
- Its phonation is voiced, which means the vocal cords vibrate during the articulation.
- It is an oral consonant, which means that air is not allowed to escape through the nose.
- It is a median consonant, which means it is produced by directing the airstream down the midline of the tongue, rather than to the sides.
- Its airstream mechanism is pulmonic, which means it is articulated by pushing air only with the intercostal muscles and abdominal muscles, as in most speech sounds.

=== Occurrence ===
Language		Word	IPA	Meaning	Notes
English	Australian	dream	[ˈd̠͡ɹ̠᷵iːm]	'dream'	Phonetic realization of the stressed, syllable-initial sequence /dr/. In General American and Received Pronunciation, the less common alternative is alveolar [d͡ɹ̝]. See Australian English phonology and English phonology
English	General American	dream	[ˈd̠͡ɹ̠᷵ʷim]	'dream'	Phonetic realization of the stressed, syllable-initial sequence /dr/. In General American and Received Pronunciation, the less common alternative is alveolar [d͡ɹ̝]. See Australian English phonology and English phonology
English	Received Pronunciation	dream	[ˈd̠͡ɹ̠᷵ʷɪi̯m]	'dream'	Phonetic realization of the stressed, syllable-initial sequence /dr/. In General American and Received Pronunciation, the less common alternative is alveolar [d͡ɹ̝]. See Australian English phonology and English phonology

== See also ==
- Index of phonetics articles

== Notes ==
Place →	Labial					Coronal										Dorsal					Laryngeal			
Manner ↓	Bilabial		Labiodental		Linguolabial		Dental		Alveolar		Postalveolar		Retroflex		(Alveolo-)palatal		Velar		Uvular		Pharyngeal/epiglottal		Glottal	
Nasal	m̥	m	ɱ̊	ɱ		n̼	n̪̊	n̪	n̥	n	n̠̊	n̠	ɳ̊	ɳ	ɲ̊	ɲ	ŋ̊	ŋ	ɴ̥	ɴ				
Plosive	p	b	p̪	b̪	t̼	d̼	t̪	d̪	t	d			ʈ	ɖ	c	ɟ	k	ɡ	q	ɢ	ʡ		ʔ	
Sibilant affricate							t̪s̪	d̪z̪	ts	dz	t̠ʃ	d̠ʒ	tʂ	dʐ	tɕ	dʑ								
Non-sibilant affricate	pɸ	bβ	p̪f	b̪v			t̪θ	d̪ð	tɹ̝̊	dɹ̝	t̠ɹ̠̊˔	d̠ɹ̠˔			cç	ɟʝ	kx	ɡɣ	qχ	ɢʁ	ʡʜ	ʡʢ	ʔh	
Sibilant fricative							s̪	z̪	s	z	ʃ	ʒ	ʂ	ʐ	ɕ	ʑ								
Non-sibilant fricative	ɸ	β	f	v	θ̼	ð̼	θ	ð	θ̠	ð̠	ɹ̠̊˔	ɹ̠˔	ɻ̊˔	ɻ˔	ç	ʝ	x	ɣ	χ	ʁ	ħ	ʕ	h	ɦ
Approximant		β̞		ʋ				ð̞		ɹ		ɹ̠		ɻ		j		ɰ						˷
Tap/flap		ⱱ̟		ⱱ					ɾ̥	ɾ			ɽ̊	ɽ						ɢ̆		ʡ̆		
Trill	ʙ̥	ʙ							r̥	r		r̠	ɽ̊r̥	ɽr					ʀ̥	ʀ	ʜ	ʢ		
Lateral affricate									tɬ	dɮ			tꞎ	d𝼅	c𝼆	ɟʎ̝	k𝼄	ɡʟ̝						
Lateral fricative							ɬ̪		ɬ	ɮ			ꞎ	𝼅	𝼆	ʎ̝	𝼄	ʟ̝						
Lateral approximant								l̪	l̥	l		l̠	ɭ̊	ɭ	ʎ̥	ʎ	ʟ̥	ʟ		ʟ̠				
Lateral tap/flap									ɺ̥	ɺ			𝼈̊	𝼈		ʎ̆		ʟ̆						

		BL	LD	D	A	PA	RF	P	V	U
Implosive	Voiced	ɓ			ɗ		ᶑ	ʄ	ɠ	ʛ
Implosive	Voiceless	ɓ̥			ɗ̥		ᶑ̊	ʄ̊	ɠ̊	ʛ̥
Ejective	Stop	pʼ			tʼ		ʈʼ	cʼ	kʼ	qʼ
Ejective	Affricate		p̪fʼ	tθʼ	tsʼ	tʃʼ	tʂʼ	tɕʼ	kxʼ	qχʼ
Ejective	Fricative	ɸʼ	fʼ	θʼ	sʼ	ʃʼ	ʂʼ	ɕʼ	xʼ	χʼ
Ejective	Lateral affricate				tɬʼ			c𝼆ʼ	k𝼄ʼ	q𝼄ʼ
Ejective	Lateral fricative				ɬʼ					
Click (top: velar; bottom: uvular)	Tenuis	kʘ qʘ		kǀ qǀ	kǃ qǃ		k𝼊 q𝼊	kǂ qǂ		
Click (top: velar; bottom: uvular)	Voiced	ɡʘ ɢʘ		ɡǀ ɢǀ	ɡǃ ɢǃ		ɡ𝼊 ɢ𝼊	ɡǂ ɢǂ		
Click (top: velar; bottom: uvular)	Nasal	ŋʘ ɴʘ		ŋǀ ɴǀ	ŋǃ ɴǃ		ŋ𝼊 ɴ𝼊	ŋǂ ɴǂ	ʞ	
Click (top: velar; bottom: uvular)	Tenuis lateral				kǁ qǁ					
Click (top: velar; bottom: uvular)	Voiced lateral				ɡǁ ɢǁ					
Click (top: velar; bottom: uvular)	Nasal lateral				ŋǁ ɴǁ					
