= Voiceless postalveolar affricate =

Consonantal sound

tʃ

t̠ʃ

ʧ
- IPA number: 103 134

Audio sample
- source · help

Encoding
- Entity (decimal): &#116;&#800;&#643;
- Unicode (hex): U+0074 U+0320 U+0283
- X-SAMPA: t_S or tS
Image

A voiceless palato-alveolar sibilant affricate or voiceless domed postalveolar sibilant affricate is a type of consonantal sound used in some spoken languages. It is familiar to English-speakers as the "ch" sound in "chip".

This sound is transcribed in the International Phonetic Alphabet with ⟨tʃ⟩, ⟨t͡ʃ⟩, ⟨t͜ʃ⟩, or in some broad transcriptions ⟨c⟩ (though this is the symbol for a voiceless palatal plosive). There is also a ligature ⟨ʧ⟩, which was retired by the International Phonetic Association but is still used. An alternative commonly used in Americanist tradition is ⟨č⟩.

Historically, [tʃ] often derives from a former voiceless velar stop /k/ (as in English church; also in Gulf Arabic, Slavic languages, Indo-Iranian languages and Romance languages), or a voiceless alveolar stop /t/ by way of palatalization, especially next to a front vowel (as in English nature; also in Amharic, Portuguese, some accents of Egyptian, etc.).

== Features ==
Features of a voiceless postalveolar affricate:

- Its manner of articulation is sibilant affricate, which means it is produced by first stopping the air flow entirely, then directing it with the tongue to the sharp edge of the teeth, causing high-frequency turbulence.
- Its place of articulation is postalveolar, which means it is articulated with the tip or blade of the tongue behind the alveolar ridge.
- Its phonation is voiceless, which means it is produced without vibrations of the vocal cords.
- It is an oral consonant, which means that air is not allowed to escape through the nose.
- It is a median consonant, which means it is produced by directing the airstream down the midline of the tongue, rather than to the sides.
- Its airstream mechanism is pulmonic, which means it is articulated by pushing air only with the intercostal muscles and abdominal muscles, as in most speech sounds.

== Occurrence ==
Language		Word	IPA	Meaning	Notes
Adyghe		чэмы/čamë/چەمہ	[t͡ʃamə]	'cow'	Some dialects contrast labialized and non-labialized forms.
Albanian		çelur	[t͡ʃɛluɾ]	'opened'	
Aleut	Atkan dialect	chamĝul	[t͡ʃɑmʁul]	'to wash'	
Amharic		አንቺ/anči	[ant͡ʃi]	'you'	
Arabic	Central Palestinian	مكتبة (Normally unwritten)/mačtabe	[ˈmat͡ʃt̪abe]	'library'	Corresponds to [k] in Standard Arabic and other varieties. See Arabic phonology
Arabic	Iraqi	چتاب/čitāb	[t͡ʃɪˈt̪ɑːb]	'book'	Corresponds to [k] in Standard Arabic and other varieties. See Arabic phonology
Arabic	Jordanian	كتاب (Normally unwritten)/čitāb	[t͡ʃɪˈt̪aːb]	'book'	Corresponds to [k] in Standard Arabic and other varieties. See Arabic phonology
Aragonese		chuego	[ˈt͡ʃueɣo]	'game'	
Armenian	Eastern	ճնճղուկ/čënčquk	[t͡ʃənt͡ʃʁuk]	'sparrow'	
Assyrian		ܟ̰ܝܡܐ/č’yama	[t͡ʃˤjɑmɑ]	'to shut'	Found in native terminology. Widespread usage in all dialect varieties. Developed from an original /tˤ/.
Asturian		Chipre	[ˈt͡ʃipɾe]	'Cyprus'	Mostly found in loanwords, if possible, usually replaced by x [ʃ].
Azerbaijani		Əkinçi/اکینچی	[ækint͡ʃʰi]	'the ploughman'	
Bengali		চশমা/čošma	[t͡ʃɔʃma]	'spectacles'	Contrasts with aspirated form. See Bengali phonology
Basque		txalupa	[t͡ʃalupa]	'boat'	
Bulgarian		чучулига/čučuliga	[t͡ʃʊt͡ʃuˈliɡɐ]	'lark'	See Bulgarian phonology
Catalan	Some speakers	cotxe	[ˈko(t)t͡ʃə]	'car'	Its pronunciation varies between an alveolo-palatal [t͡ɕ] and a postalveolar [t͡ʃ] fricative. See Catalan phonology.
Catalan	Some Valencian speakers	xec	[ˈt͡ʃek]	'cheque'	Its pronunciation varies between an alveolo-palatal [t͡ɕ] and a postalveolar [t͡ʃ] fricative. See Catalan phonology.
Catalan	Some speakers	tots	[ˈt̪ot͡ʃ]	'all, everyone'	Its pronunciation varies between an alveolo-palatal [t͡ɕ] and a postalveolar [t͡ʃ] fricative. See Catalan phonology.
Central Alaskan Yup'ik		nacaq	[ˈnat͡ʃaq]	'parka hood'	
Choctaw		hakchioma	[hakt͡ʃioma]	'tobacco'	
Coptic	Bohairic dialect	ϭⲟϩ/čoh	[t͡ʃʰɔh]	'touch'	
Czech		morče	[ˈmɔrt͡ʃɛ]	'guinea pig'	See Czech phonology
Dhivehi		ޗަކަސް / čakas	[t͡ʃakas]	'mud'	Relatively rare, usually occurs in loanwords / onomatoepic words
Dutch		Tjongejonge	[t͡ʃɔŋəjɔŋə]	'jeez'	An exclamation of (mild) annoyance, surprise, wonder or amazement. Pronunciation is region dependent.
English		beach	[biːt͡ʃ]	'beach'	Slightly labialized [tʃʷ]. See English phonology
Esperanto		ĉar	[t͡ʃar]	'because'	See Esperanto phonology
Estonian		tšello	[ˈtʃelˑo]	'cello'	Rare, occurs only in loanwords. see Estonian phonology
Faroese		gera	[t͡ʃeːɹa]	'to do'	Contrasts with aspirated form. See Faroese phonology
Finnish		Tšekki	[ˈt̪ʃe̞kːi]	'Czechia'	Rare, occurs only in loanwords. See Finnish phonology
French	Standard	caoutchouc	[kaut͡ʃu]	'rubber'	Relatively rare; occurs mostly in loanwords. See French phonology
French	Acadian	tiens	[t͡ʃɛ̃]	'(I/you) keep'	Allophone of /k/ and /tj/ before a front vowel.
Galician		cheo	[ˈt͡ʃeo]	'full'	Galician-Portuguese /t͡ʃ/ is conserved in Galician and merged with /ʃ/ in most Portuguese dialects. See Galician phonology
Georgian		ჩიხი/čixi	[t͡ʃixi]	'impasse'	
German	Standard	Tschüss	[t͡ʃʏs]	'bye'	Laminal or apico-laminal and strongly labialized. See Standard German phonology
Greek	Cypriot	τσ̌άι/čai	[t͡ʃɑːiː]	'tea'	
Hausa		ciwo/ثِيوُاْ	[t͡ʃíː.wòː]	'disease, pain'	
Hebrew		תשובה/čuva	[t͡ʃuˈva]	'answer'	See Modern Hebrew phonology
Hindustani	Hindi	चाय/cāy	[t͡ʃaːj]	'tea'	Contrasts with aspirated form. See Hindustani phonology
Hindustani	Urdu	چائے/çāy	[t͡ʃaːj]	'tea'	Contrasts with aspirated form. See Hindustani phonology
Haitian Creole		match	[mat͡ʃ]	'sports match'	
Hungarian		gyümölcslé	[ˈɟymølt͡ʃleː]	'fruit juice'	See Hungarian phonology
Italian		ciao	[ˈt͡ʃaːo]	'hi'	See Italian phonology
Javanese		cedhak/ꦕꦼꦣꦏ꧀/چۤڎَاك	[t͡ʃəɖaʔ]	'near'	
Kʼicheʼ		K'iche'	[kʼiˈt͡ʃeʔ]	'Kʼicheʼ''	Contrasts with ejective form
Kabardian		чэнж/čanž/چەنژ	[t͡ʃanʒ]	'shallow'	
Kashmiri		چاے/cāy/	[t͡ʃaːj]	'tea'	
Kashubian		czësto	[t͡ʃəstɔ]	'cleanly'	
Kharia		रओछओब	[rɔ̀.t͡ʃʰɔ́ʔb˺ᵐ]	'side'	A low-tone pitch in the first syllable, then gradually turns high in the second one. See Anderson (2014) for discussion.
Khortha		चइन	[t͡ʃinʱ]	'mark'	
Kurdish		hirç/هرچ	[hɪɾt͡ʃ]	'bear'	
Ladino		kolcha/קולגﬞה	[ˈkolt͡ʃa]	'quilt'	
Macedonian		чека/čeka	[t͡ʃɛka]	'wait'	See Macedonian phonology
Malay	Malaysian	cuci/چوچي	[t͡ʃut͡ʃi]	'to wash'	See Malay phonology
Malay	Indonesian	cuci/چوچي	[t͡ʃut͡ʃi]	'to wash'	Palatal [c] according to some analyses. See Malay phonology
Makah		qʷidiččaʔa·tx̌	[qʷɪdɪt͡ʃt͡ʃəʔatχ]	'Makah'	Contrasts with ejective form
Malayalam		ചതി/chathi	[t͡ʃɐd̪i]	'betrayal'	See Malayalam phonology
Maltese		bliċ	[blit͡ʃ]	'bleach'	
Manx		çhiarn	[ˈt͡ʃaːrn]	'lord'	
Marathi		चहा/čahá	[t͡ʃəhaː]	'tea'	Contrasts with aspirated form. Allophone of /tɕ / and /ts/.See Marathi phonology
Mongolian	Khalkha dialect	наргиж/nargič ᠨᠠᠷᠭᠢᠵ	[ˈnargit͡ʃ]	'laugh'	
Nahuatl		āyōtōchtli	[aːjoːˈtoːt͡ʃt͡ɬi]	'armadillo'	
Norwegian	Some dialects	kjøkken	[t͡ʃøkːen]	'kitchen'	See Norwegian phonology
Nunggubuyu		jaro	[t͡ʃaɾo]	'needle'	
Occitan		chuc	[ˈt͡ʃyk]	'juice'	See Occitan phonology
Odia		ଚକ/caka	[t͡ʃɔkɔ]	'wheel'	Contrasts with aspirated form.
Persian		چوب/чӯб/çub	[t͡ʃʰuːb]	'wood'	See Persian phonology
Polish	Gmina Istebna	ciemny	[ˈt͡ʃɛmn̪ɘ]	'dark'	/ʈ͡ʂ/ and /t͡ɕ/ merge into [t͡ʃ] in these dialects. In standard Polish, /t͡ʃ/ is commonly used to transcribe what actually is a laminal voiceless retroflex affricate.
Polish	Lubawa dialect	ciemny	[ˈt͡ʃɛmn̪ɘ]	'dark'	/ʈ͡ʂ/ and /t͡ɕ/ merge into [t͡ʃ] in these dialects. In standard Polish, /t͡ʃ/ is commonly used to transcribe what actually is a laminal voiceless retroflex affricate.
Polish	Malbork dialect	ciemny	[ˈt͡ʃɛmn̪ɘ]	'dark'	/ʈ͡ʂ/ and /t͡ɕ/ merge into [t͡ʃ] in these dialects. In standard Polish, /t͡ʃ/ is commonly used to transcribe what actually is a laminal voiceless retroflex affricate.
Polish	Ostróda dialect	ciemny	[ˈt͡ʃɛmn̪ɘ]	'dark'	/ʈ͡ʂ/ and /t͡ɕ/ merge into [t͡ʃ] in these dialects. In standard Polish, /t͡ʃ/ is commonly used to transcribe what actually is a laminal voiceless retroflex affricate.
Polish	Warmia dialect	ciemny	[ˈt͡ʃɛmn̪ɘ]	'dark'	/ʈ͡ʂ/ and /t͡ɕ/ merge into [t͡ʃ] in these dialects. In standard Polish, /t͡ʃ/ is commonly used to transcribe what actually is a laminal voiceless retroflex affricate.
Portuguese	Most northern and some central Portuguese dialects	chamar	[t͡ʃɐˈmaɾ]	'to call'	Archaic realization of etymological ⟨ch⟩. Its use is diminishing due to influence of the standard language, being replaced by [ʃ].
Portuguese	Most Brazilian dialects	presente	[pɾe̞ˈzẽ̞t͡ʃi]	'present'	Allophone of /t/ before /i, ĩ/ (including when [i, ĩ, j] is not actually produced) and other instances of [i] (e.g. epenthesis), marginal sound otherwise. See Portuguese phonology
Portuguese	Most dialects	tchau	[ˈt͡ʃaw]	'bye'	In Standard European Portuguese it occurs only in recent loanwords.
Punjabi		ਚੌਲ/ چول/čol	[t͡ʃɔːl]	'rice'	
Quechua		chunka	[t͡ʃʊŋka]	'ten'	
Romani		ćiriklo	[t͡ʃiriˈklo]	'bird'	Contrasts with aspirated form.
Romanian		cer	[ˈt͡ʃe̞r]	'sky'	See Romanian phonology
Rotuman		joni	[ˈt͡ʃɔni]	'to flee'	
Russian		человек	[ˈt͡ʃɪlɐˈvʲek]	'person'	Allophone of /tɕ/. See Russian phonology
Scottish Gaelic		slàinte	[ˈsl̪ˠaːnʲt͡ʃə]	'health'	Southern dialects only; standard pronunciation is [tʲ]. See Scottish Gaelic phonology
Serbo-Croatian	Some speakers	čokoláda чоколада	[t͡ʃo̞ko̞ˈɫǎ̠ːd̪a̠]	'chocolate'	In varieties that do not distinguish /ʈ͡ʂ/ from /t͡ɕ/.
Silesian	Gmina Istebna	szpańelsko	[t̠͡ʃpaɲɛskɔ]	'Spanish'	These dialects merge /ʈ͡ʂ/ and /t͡ɕ/ into [t͡ʃ].
Silesian	Jablunkov	szpańelsko	[t̠͡ʃpaɲɛlskɔ]	'Spanish'	These dialects merge /ʈ͡ʂ/ and /t͡ɕ/ into [t͡ʃ].
Slovak		číslo	[t͡ʃiːslo]	'number'	See Slovak phonology
Slovene		koča	[ˈkòːt͡ʃáː]	'cottage'	
Solos		tsino	[t͡ʃinɔ]	'bone'	
Spanish		chocolate	[t͡ʃo̞ko̞ˈlät̪e̞]	'chocolate'	See Spanish phonology
Swahili		jicho/جِيچٗ	[ʄit͡ʃo]	'eye'	
Swedish	Finland	tjugo	[t͡ʃʉːɡʉ]	'twenty'	See Swedish phonology
Swedish	Some rural Swedish dialects	kärlek	[t͡ʃæːɭeːk]	'love'	See Swedish phonology
Tagalog		tsuper	[t͡ʃʊˈpɛɾ]	'driver'	See Tagalog phonology
Tlingit		jinkaat	[ˈt͡ʃinkʰaːt]	'ten'	
Turkish		çok	[t͡ʃo̞k]	'very'	See Turkish phonology
Tyap		cat	[t͡ʃad]	'love'	
Ubykh		Çəbƹəja/čëbžëya	[t͡ʃəbʒəja]	'pepper'	See Ubykh phonology
Ukrainian		чотири/čotyry	[t͡ʃo̞ˈtɪrɪ]	'four'	See Ukrainian phonology
Uzbek		choʻl/çúl/چۉل	[t͡ʃɵl]	'desert'	
Welsh		tsips	[t͡ʃɪps]	'chips'	Occurs in loanwords. See Welsh phonology
West Frisian		Tytsjerksteradiel	[tiˈt͡ʃɛrkstəraˌdiə̯l]	'Tytsjerksteradiel'	See West Frisian phonology
Yiddish		טשאַטשקע/čačke	[t͡ʃat͡ʃkɛ]	'knick-knack'	See Yiddish phonology
Zapotec	Tilquiapan	chane	[t͡ʃanɘ]		

Mandarin Chinese, Russian, Japanese, Korean, Mongolian, Polish, Catalan, and Thai have a voiceless alveolo-palatal affricate /t͡ɕ/; this is technically postalveolar but it is less precise to use /t͡ʃ/.

=== Related characters ===
There are several Unicode characters based on the tesh digraph (ʧ):

- U+107AE 𐞮 MODIFIER LETTER SMALL TESH DIGRAPH is an IPA superscript letter
- U+1DF17 𝼗 LATIN SMALL LETTER TESH DIGRAPH WITH PALATAL HOOK is used in phonetic transcription
- U+1DF1C 𝼜 LATIN SMALL LETTER TESH DIGRAPH WITH RETROFLEX HOOK has been used in phonetic descriptions of Polish

== Voiceless postalveolar non-sibilant affricate ==
Voiceless postalveolar non-sibilant affricate

t̠ɹ̝̊

Audio sample
- source · help

=== Features ===
- Its manner of articulation is affricate, which means it is produced by first stopping the airflow entirely, then allowing air flow through a constricted channel at the place of articulation, causing turbulence.
- Its place of articulation is postalveolar, which means it is articulated with the tip or blade of the tongue behind the alveolar ridge.
- Its phonation is voiceless, which means it is produced without vibrations of the vocal cords.
- It is an oral consonant, which means that air is not allowed to escape through the nose.
- It is a median consonant, which means it is produced by directing the airstream down the midline of the tongue, rather than to the sides.
- Its airstream mechanism is pulmonic, which means it is articulated by pushing air only with the intercostal muscles and abdominal muscles, as in most speech sounds.

=== Occurrence ===
Language		Word	IPA	Meaning	Notes
English	Australian	tree	[t̠͡ɹ̝̠̊iː]	'tree'	Phonetic realization of the stressed, syllable-initial sequence /tr/. In General American and Received Pronunciation, the less common alternative is alveolar [tɹ̝̊]. See Australian English phonology and English phonology
English	General American	tree	[t̠͡ɹ̝̠̊ʷi]	'tree'	Phonetic realization of the stressed, syllable-initial sequence /tr/. In General American and Received Pronunciation, the less common alternative is alveolar [tɹ̝̊]. See Australian English phonology and English phonology
English	Received Pronunciation	tree	[t̠͡ɹ̝̠̊ʷɪi̯]	'tree'	Phonetic realization of the stressed, syllable-initial sequence /tr/. In General American and Received Pronunciation, the less common alternative is alveolar [tɹ̝̊]. See Australian English phonology and English phonology
Scottish Gaelic	Lewis	sitrich	[ˈʃiᶜ̧t̠͡ɹ̝̠̊iç]	'to neigh'	Palato-alveolar. Phonetic realization of /t̪ɾ/ after palatal or palatalised consonants in medial clusters.

== Notes ==
Place →	Labial					Coronal										Dorsal					Laryngeal			
Manner ↓	Bilabial		Labiodental		Linguolabial		Dental		Alveolar		Postalveolar		Retroflex		(Alveolo-)palatal		Velar		Uvular		Pharyngeal/epiglottal		Glottal	
Nasal	m̥	m	ɱ̊	ɱ		n̼	n̪̊	n̪	n̥	n	n̠̊	n̠	ɳ̊	ɳ	ɲ̊	ɲ	ŋ̊	ŋ	ɴ̥	ɴ				
Plosive	p	b	p̪	b̪	t̼	d̼	t̪	d̪	t	d			ʈ	ɖ	c	ɟ	k	ɡ	q	ɢ	ʡ		ʔ	
Sibilant affricate							t̪s̪	d̪z̪	ts	dz	t̠ʃ	d̠ʒ	tʂ	dʐ	tɕ	dʑ								
Non-sibilant affricate	pɸ	bβ	p̪f	b̪v			t̪θ	d̪ð	tɹ̝̊	dɹ̝	t̠ɹ̠̊˔	d̠ɹ̠˔			cç	ɟʝ	kx	ɡɣ	qχ	ɢʁ	ʡʜ	ʡʢ	ʔh	
Sibilant fricative							s̪	z̪	s	z	ʃ	ʒ	ʂ	ʐ	ɕ	ʑ								
Non-sibilant fricative	ɸ	β	f	v	θ̼	ð̼	θ	ð	θ̠	ð̠	ɹ̠̊˔	ɹ̠˔	ɻ̊˔	ɻ˔	ç	ʝ	x	ɣ	χ	ʁ	ħ	ʕ	h	ɦ
Approximant		β̞		ʋ				ð̞		ɹ		ɹ̠		ɻ		j		ɰ						˷
Tap/flap		ⱱ̟		ⱱ					ɾ̥	ɾ			ɽ̊	ɽ						ɢ̆		ʡ̆		
Trill	ʙ̥	ʙ							r̥	r		r̠	ɽ̊r̥	ɽr					ʀ̥	ʀ	ʜ	ʢ		
Lateral affricate									tɬ	dɮ			tꞎ	d𝼅	c𝼆	ɟʎ̝	k𝼄	ɡʟ̝						
Lateral fricative							ɬ̪		ɬ	ɮ			ꞎ	𝼅	𝼆	ʎ̝	𝼄	ʟ̝						
Lateral approximant								l̪	l̥	l		l̠	ɭ̊	ɭ	ʎ̥	ʎ	ʟ̥	ʟ		ʟ̠				
Lateral tap/flap									ɺ̥	ɺ			𝼈̊	𝼈		ʎ̆		ʟ̆						

		BL	LD	D	A	PA	RF	P	V	U
Implosive	Voiced	ɓ			ɗ		ᶑ	ʄ	ɠ	ʛ
Implosive	Voiceless	ɓ̥			ɗ̥		ᶑ̊	ʄ̊	ɠ̊	ʛ̥
Ejective	Stop	pʼ			tʼ		ʈʼ	cʼ	kʼ	qʼ
Ejective	Affricate		p̪fʼ	tθʼ	tsʼ	tʃʼ	tʂʼ	tɕʼ	kxʼ	qχʼ
Ejective	Fricative	ɸʼ	fʼ	θʼ	sʼ	ʃʼ	ʂʼ	ɕʼ	xʼ	χʼ
Ejective	Lateral affricate				tɬʼ			c𝼆ʼ	k𝼄ʼ	q𝼄ʼ
Ejective	Lateral fricative				ɬʼ					
Click (top: velar; bottom: uvular)	Tenuis	kʘ qʘ		kǀ qǀ	kǃ qǃ		k𝼊 q𝼊	kǂ qǂ		
Click (top: velar; bottom: uvular)	Voiced	ɡʘ ɢʘ		ɡǀ ɢǀ	ɡǃ ɢǃ		ɡ𝼊 ɢ𝼊	ɡǂ ɢǂ		
Click (top: velar; bottom: uvular)	Nasal	ŋʘ ɴʘ		ŋǀ ɴǀ	ŋǃ ɴǃ		ŋ𝼊 ɴ𝼊	ŋǂ ɴǂ	ʞ	
Click (top: velar; bottom: uvular)	Tenuis lateral				kǁ qǁ					
Click (top: velar; bottom: uvular)	Voiced lateral				ɡǁ ɢǁ					
Click (top: velar; bottom: uvular)	Nasal lateral				ŋǁ ɴǁ					
