= Voiceless postalveolar fricative =

Consonantal sound often represented by ⟨ʃ⟩ in IPA

ʃ
- IPA number: 134

Audio sample
- source · help

Encoding
- Entity (decimal): &#643;
- Unicode (hex): U+0283
- X-SAMPA: S
- Braille: ⠱ (braille pattern dots-156)
Image

A voiceless postalveolar or palato-alveolar fricative is a type of consonantal sound used in many spoken languages. It is familiar to English-speakers as the "sh" sound in "ship".

The sound is represented in the International Phonetic Alphabet with the letter ⟨ʃ⟩. The International Phonetic Association uses the phrase voiceless postalveolar fricative for the sibilant sound [ ʃ ], though technically it also describes the voiceless postalveolar non-sibilant fricative [ɹ̠̊˔], for which there are significant perceptual differences.

== Voiceless palato-alveolar fricative ==
A voiceless palato-alveolar fricative or voiceless domed postalveolar fricative is a type of consonantal sound used in many languages, including English. In English, it is usually spelled ⟨sh⟩, as in ship.

Sagittal section of a voiceless palato-alveolar fricative

The symbol in the International Phonetic Alphabet that represents this sound is ⟨ ʃ ⟩, the letter esh introduced by Isaac Pitman (not to be confused with the integral symbol ⟨∫⟩).

An alternative symbol is ⟨š⟩, an s with a caron or háček, which is used in the Americanist phonetic notation and the Uralic Phonetic Alphabet, as well as in the scientific and ISO 9 transliterations of Cyrillic. It originated with the Czech orthography of Jan Hus and was adopted in Gaj's Latin alphabet and other Latin alphabets of Slavic languages. It also features in the orthographies of many Baltic, Finno-Samic, North American and African languages.

=== Features ===
Features of the voiceless palato-alveolar fricative:

- Its manner of articulation is sibilant (a subclass of fricatives and affricates), which means it is generally produced with a higher-frequency turbulence. Sibilants may be articulated with various tongue shapes and degrees of palatalization, depending on their place of articulation.
- Its place of articulation is postalveolar, which means it is articulated with the tip or blade of the tongue behind the alveolar ridge.
- Its phonation is voiceless, which means it is produced without vibrations of the vocal cords. In some languages the vocal cords are actively separated, so it is always voiceless; in others the cords are lax, so that it may take on the voicing of adjacent sounds.
- It is an oral consonant, which means that air is not allowed to escape through the nose.
- It is a median consonant, which means it is produced by directing the airstream down the midline of the tongue, rather than to the sides.
- Its airstream mechanism is pulmonic, which means it is articulated by pushing air only with the intercostal muscles and abdominal muscles, as in most speech sounds.

=== Occurrence ===
Language		Word	IPA	Meaning	Notes
Adyghe		шыд	[ʃəd]	'donkey'	
Albanian		shtëpi	[ʃtəˈpi]	'house'	
Arabic	Modern Standard	شَمْس	[ʃams]	'sun'	See Arabic phonology
Armenian	Eastern	շուն	[ʃun]	'dog'	
Aromanian		shi	[ʃi]	'and'	
Assyrian		ܫܒܬܐ šebta	[ʃεbta]	'saturday'	
Asturian		(la) xera	[la ˈʃjeɾa]	('the') 'task'	May be realised as [ʃj ~ ɕj ~ ɕ ~ ʃ], depending on context and speaker.
Azerbaijani		şeir	[ʃeiɾ]	'poem'	
Bashkir		биш / biş	[bʲiʃ]	'five'	
Basque		kaixo	[kajʃ̺o]	'hello'	Apical.
Bengali		দেশ	[deʃ]	'country'	See Bengali phonology
Breton		chadenn	[ˈʃadɛ̃n]	'chain'	
Bulgarian		юнашки	[juˈnaʃki]	'heroically'	See Bulgarian phonology
Catalan	Some speakers	reixa	[ˈre(j)ʃə]	'grille'	Its pronunciation varies between an alveolo-palatal [ɕ] and a palato-alveolar [ʃ] fricative. See Catalan phonology.
Chechen		шура / şura	['ʃurə]	'milk'	
Chuvash		шурă	['ʃurə]	'white'	
Czech		kaše	[ˈkaʃɛ]	'mash'	See Czech phonology
Dutch		sjabloon	[ʃäˈbloːn]	'template'	May be [sʲ] or [ɕ] instead. See Dutch phonology
English		sheep	[ˈʃiːp]	'sheep'	See English phonology
Esperanto		ŝelko	[ˈʃelko]	'suspenders'	See Esperanto phonology
Faroese		sjúkrahús	[ʃʉukrahʉus]	'hospital'	See Faroese phonology
Finnish		šekki	[ʃekːi]	'check'	See Finnish phonology
French		cher	[ʃɛʁ]	'expensive'	See French phonology
Galician		viaxe	[ˈbjaʃe]	'trip'	See Galician phonology
Georgian		შარი	[ˈʃɑɾi]	'quibbling'	
German	Standard	schön	[ʃøːn]	'beautiful'	Laminal or apico-laminal and strongly labialized. See Standard German phonology
Greek	Cypriot	ασσιήμια	[ɐˈʃːimɲɐ]	'ugliness'	Contrasts with /ʃ/ and /ʒː/
Greek	Pontic	ςςον	[ʃo̞n]	'snow'	
Hebrew		שָׁלוֹם	[ʃaˈlom]	'peace'	See Modern Hebrew phonology
Hindustani	Hindi	शर्मिन्दगी	[ʃəɾ.mɪn̪.d̪ə.ɡiː]	'embarrassment'	See Hindustani phonology.
Hindustani	Urdu	شرمندگی	[ʃəɾ.mɪn̪.d̪ə.ɡiː]	'embarrassment'	See Hindustani phonology.
Hungarian		só	[ʃoː]	'salt'	See Hungarian phonology
Ilocano		siák	[ʃak]	'I'	
Irish		sí	[ʃiː]	'she'	See Irish phonology
Italian	Marked accents of Emilia-Romagna	sali	[ˈʃäːli]	'you go up'	Apical non-labialized; may be [s̺ʲ] or [ʂ] instead. It corresponds to [s] in standard Italian. See Italian phonology
Italian	Standard	fasce	[ˈfäʃːe]	'bands'	See Italian phonology
Kabardian		шыд	[ʃɛd]	'donkey'	Contrasts with a labialized form
Kabyle		ciwer	[ʃiwər]	'to consult'	
Kashubian		nasz	[naʃ]	'our'	See Kashubian language
Kazakh		шаш / şaş	[ʃаʃ]	'hair'	
Kurdish		şev	[ʃɛv]	'night'	See Kurdish phonology
Latvian		šalle	[ˈʃalːe]	'scarf'	See Latvian phonology
Lillooet		stswúw̓ecw	[ˈʃtʃwuˀwəxʷ]	'creek'	
Limburgish	Maastrichtian	sjat	[ʃɑ̽t]	'darling'	Laminal post-alveolar with an unclear amount of palatalization.
Lingala		shakú	[ʃakú]	'grey parrot'	
Lithuanian		šarvas	[ˈʃɐrˑvɐs]	'armor'	See Lithuanian phonology
Macedonian		што	[ʃtɔ]	'what'	See Macedonian phonology
Malay		syarikat	[ʃarikat]	'company'	
Malayalam		വീശൽ/veeshal	[ʋiːʃɐl]	'fanning' or 'blowing'	See Malayalam phonology
Maltese		x′jismek?	[ˈʃjɪsmɛk]	'what is your name?'	
Marathi		शब्द	[ˈʃəbd̪ə]	'word'	See Marathi phonology
Mayan	Yucatec	ko'ox	[koʔoʃ]	'let's go'	
Mopan		kax	[kɑːʃ]	'chicken'	
Mpade		sha	[ʃa]	'cow'	
Mutsun		raṭmašte	[ɾɑʈmɑʃtɛ]	'having acne'	
Neapolitan		scugnizzo	[ʃkuˈɲːitt͡sə]	'urchin'	
Occitan	Auvergnat	maissant	[meˈʃɔ̃]	'bad'	See Occitan phonology
Occitan	Gascon	maishant	[maˈʃan]		See Occitan phonology
Occitan	Limousin	son	[ʃũ]	'his'	See Occitan phonology
Persian		شاه	[ʃɒːh]	'king'	See Persian phonology
Polish	Gmina Istebna	siano	[ˈʃän̪ɔ]	'hay'	/ʂ/ and /ɕ/ merge into [ʃ] in these dialects. In standard Polish, /ʃ/ is commonly used to transcribe what actually is a laminal voiceless retroflex sibilant
Polish	Lubawa dialect	siano	[ˈʃän̪ɔ]	'hay'	/ʂ/ and /ɕ/ merge into [ʃ] in these dialects. In standard Polish, /ʃ/ is commonly used to transcribe what actually is a laminal voiceless retroflex sibilant
Polish	Malbork dialect	siano	[ˈʃän̪ɔ]	'hay'	/ʂ/ and /ɕ/ merge into [ʃ] in these dialects. In standard Polish, /ʃ/ is commonly used to transcribe what actually is a laminal voiceless retroflex sibilant
Polish	Ostróda dialect	siano	[ˈʃän̪ɔ]	'hay'	/ʂ/ and /ɕ/ merge into [ʃ] in these dialects. In standard Polish, /ʃ/ is commonly used to transcribe what actually is a laminal voiceless retroflex sibilant
Polish	Warmia dialect	siano	[ˈʃän̪ɔ]	'hay'	/ʂ/ and /ɕ/ merge into [ʃ] in these dialects. In standard Polish, /ʃ/ is commonly used to transcribe what actually is a laminal voiceless retroflex sibilant
Portuguese		xamã	[ʃɐˈmɐ̃]	'shaman'	Also described as alveolo-palatal [ɕ]. See Portuguese phonology
Punjabi		ਸ਼ੇਰ	[ʃeːɾ]	'lion'	
Romani		deš	[deʃ]	'ten'	
Romanian		șefi	[ʃefʲ]	'bosses'	See Romanian phonology
Sahaptin		šíš	[ʃiʃ]	'mush'	
Scottish Gaelic		seinn	[ʃeiɲ]	'sing'	See Scottish Gaelic phonology
Serbo-Croatian		škola	[ʃkôːla]	'school'	See Serbo-Croatian phonology
Silesian	Gmina Istebna				These dialects merge /ʂ/ and /ɕ/ into [ʃ]
Silesian	Jablunkov				These dialects merge /ʂ/ and /ɕ/ into [ʃ]
Slovak		škola	[ʃkɔla]	'school'	See Slovak phonology
Slovene		šola	[ˈʃóːlà]	'school'	See Slovene phonology
Somali		shan	[ʃan]	'five'	See Somali phonology
Spanish	New Mexican	echador	[e̞ʃäˈðo̞ɾ]	'boastful'	Corresponds to [t͡ʃ] in other dialects. See Spanish phonology
Spanish	Northern Mexico	echador	[e̞ʃäˈðo̞ɾ]	'boastful'	Corresponds to [t͡ʃ] in other dialects. See Spanish phonology
Spanish	Cuban	echador	[e̞ʃäˈðo̞ɾ]	'boastful'	Corresponds to [t͡ʃ] in other dialects. See Spanish phonology
Spanish	Panamanian	chocolate	[ʃo̞ko̞ˈläte̞]	'chocolate'	Corresponds to [t͡ʃ] in other dialects. See Spanish phonology
Spanish	Southern Andalusia	chocolate	[ʃo̞ko̞ˈläte̞]	'chocolate'	Corresponds to [t͡ʃ] in other dialects. See Spanish phonology
Spanish	Chilean	chocolate	[ʃo̞ko̞ˈläte̞]	'chocolate'	Corresponds to [t͡ʃ] in other dialects. See Spanish phonology
Spanish	Rioplatense	ayer	[äˈʃe̞ɾ]	'yesterday'	May be voiced [ʒ] instead. See Spanish phonology and yeísmo
Sranantongo		syène	[ˈʃɛne]	'blunder, disappointment'	
Swahili		shule	[ʃule]	'school'	
Swedish	Västerbotten dialect	svår	[ˈʃwoːr]	'difficult'	
Tagalog		siya	[ʃa]	'he/she'	See Tagalog phonology
Telugu		శపథము	[ʃapat̪ʰamu]	'oath'	See Telugu phonology
Toda		[pɔʃ]		'language'	Contrasts /θ s̪ s̠ ʃ ʒ ʂ ʐ/.
Tunica		šíhkali	[ˈʃihkali]	'stone'	
Turkish		güneş	[ɟyˈne̞ʃ]	'sun'	See Turkish phonology
Ukrainian		шахи	['ʃɑxɪ]	'chess'	See Ukrainian phonology
Urdu		شکریہ	[ʃʊkˈriːaː]	'thank you'	See Hindustani phonology
Uyghur		شەھەر	[ʃæhær]	'city'	
Uzbek		bosh	[bɒʃ]	'head'	
Walloon		texhou	[tɛʃu]	'knit fabric'	
Welsh	Standard	siarad	[ˈʃɑːrad]	'speak'	See Welsh phonology
Welsh	Southern dialects	mis	[miːʃ]	'month'	See Welsh phonology
West Frisian		anymasje	[ˌaniˈmaʃə]	'animation'	See West Frisian phonology
Western Lombard	Canzés	fescia	[feʃa]	'nuisance'	
Wu Chinese	Northern Wu (Shengpu locality)	詩	[ʃz̩ʷ ˥]	'poem'	
Yiddish		וויסנשאַפֿטלעכע	[vɪsn̩ʃaftləχə]	'scientific'	See Yiddish phonology
Yorùbá		ṣí	[ʃi]	'open'	
Zapotec	Tilquiapan	xana	[ʃana]	'how?'	

In various languages, including English and French, it may have simultaneous labialization, i.e. [ʃʷ], although this is usually not transcribed.

Classical Latin did not have [ʃ], though it does occur in most Romance languages. For example, ⟨ch⟩ in French chanteur "singer" is pronounced /ʃ/. Chanteur is descended from Latin cantare, where ⟨c⟩ was pronounced /k/. The ⟨sc⟩ in Latin scientia "science" was pronounced /sk/, but has shifted to /ʃ/ in Italian scienza.

Similarly, Proto-Germanic had neither [ʃ] nor [ʂ], yet many of its descendants do. In most cases, this [ʃ] or [ʂ] descends from a Proto-Germanic /sk/. For instance, Proto-Germanic *skipą ("hollow object, water-borne vessel larger than a boat") was pronounced /ˈski.pɑ̃/. The English word "ship" /ʃɪp/ has been pronounced without the /sk/ the longest, the word being descended from Old English "scip" /ʃip/, which already also had the [ʃ], though the Old English spelling etymologically indicated that the old /sk/ had once been present.

This change took longer to catch on in West Germanic languages other than Old English, though it eventually did. The second West Germanic language to undergo this sound shift was Old High German. After High German, the shift most likely then occurred in Low Saxon. After Low Saxon, Middle Dutch began the shift, but it stopped shifting once it reached /sx/, and has kept that pronunciation since. Then, most likely through influence from German and Low Saxon, North Frisian experienced the shift.

Then, Swedish quite swiftly underwent the shift, which resulted in the very uncommon [ɧ] phoneme, which, aside from Swedish, is only used in Colognian, a variety of High German, though not as a replacement for the standard High German /ʃ/ but a coronalized /ç/. However, the exact realization of Swedish /ɧ/ varies considerably among dialects; for instance, in Northern dialects it tends to be realized as [ʂ]. See sj-sound for more details. Finally, the last to undergo the shift was Norwegian, in which the result of the shift was [ʃ].

The sound in Russian denoted by ⟨ш⟩ is commonly transcribed as a palato-alveolar fricative but is actually an apical retroflex fricative.

== Voiceless postalveolar non-sibilant fricative ==
Voiceless postalveolar non-sibilant fricative

ɹ̠̊˔
- IPA number: 151 414 402B 429

Audio sample
- source · help

Encoding
- X-SAMPA: r\_-_0_r

A voiceless postalveolar non-sibilant fricative is a type of consonantal sound used in some spoken languages. It can be transcribed in the International Phonetic Alphabet as ⟨ɹ̝̠̊⟩ (dated variants ⟨ɹ̠̊˔⟩, ⟨ɹ̝̊˗⟩), which indicates a [ɹ] that is retracted, raised, and voiceless.

=== Features ===
- Its manner of articulation is fricative, which means it is produced by constricting air flow through a narrow channel at the place of articulation, causing turbulence. However, it does not have the grooved tongue and directed airflow, or the high frequencies, of a sibilant.
- Its place of articulation is postalveolar, which means it is articulated with either the tip or the blade of the tongue behind the alveolar ridge.
- Its phonation is voiceless, which means it is produced without vibrations of the vocal cords. In some languages the vocal cords are actively separated, so it is always voiceless; in others the cords are lax, so that it may take on the voicing of adjacent sounds.
- It is an oral consonant, which means that air is not allowed to escape through the nose.
- It is a median consonant, which means it is produced by directing the airstream down the midline of the tongue, rather than to the sides.
- Its airstream mechanism is pulmonic, which means it is articulated by pushing air only with the intercostal muscles and abdominal muscles, as in most speech sounds.

=== Occurrence ===
Language		Word	IPA	Meaning	Notes
English	Received Pronunciation	crew	[kɹ̝̠̊ʊu̯]	'crew'	Only partially devoiced. It is a realization of /r/ after the word-initial fortis plosives /p, k/, unless they are preceded by /s/ within the same syllable. See English phonology

=== Voiceless postalveolar approximant ===
Voiceless postalveolar approximant

ɹ̠̊

Some scholars also posit the voiceless postalveolar approximant distinct from the fricative. The approximant may be represented in the IPA as ⟨ɹ̠̊⟩.

Language		Word	IPA	Meaning	Notes
Ao	Changki		[ɹ̠̊u]	'stitch'	Contrasts with voiced [ɹ̠]. Treated phonologically as approximant, but phonetically fricative-like.
Bengali	Some dialects	আবার	[ˈäbäɹ̠̊]	'again'	Apical; possible allophone of /ɹ/ in the syllable coda. See Bengali phonology

== See also ==
- Index of phonetics articles
- Voiced postalveolar fricative
- Cedilla
- Shibboleth

== Notes ==
Place →	Labial					Coronal										Dorsal					Laryngeal			
Manner ↓	Bilabial		Labiodental		Linguolabial		Dental		Alveolar		Postalveolar		Retroflex		(Alveolo-)palatal		Velar		Uvular		Pharyngeal/epiglottal		Glottal	
Nasal	m̥	m	ɱ̊	ɱ		n̼	n̪̊	n̪	n̥	n	n̠̊	n̠	ɳ̊	ɳ	ɲ̊	ɲ	ŋ̊	ŋ	ɴ̥	ɴ				
Plosive	p	b	p̪	b̪	t̼	d̼	t̪	d̪	t	d			ʈ	ɖ	c	ɟ	k	ɡ	q	ɢ	ʡ		ʔ	
Sibilant affricate							t̪s̪	d̪z̪	ts	dz	t̠ʃ	d̠ʒ	tʂ	dʐ	tɕ	dʑ								
Non-sibilant affricate	pɸ	bβ	p̪f	b̪v			t̪θ	d̪ð	tɹ̝̊	dɹ̝	t̠ɹ̠̊˔	d̠ɹ̠˔			cç	ɟʝ	kx	ɡɣ	qχ	ɢʁ	ʡʜ	ʡʢ	ʔh	
Sibilant fricative							s̪	z̪	s	z	ʃ	ʒ	ʂ	ʐ	ɕ	ʑ								
Non-sibilant fricative	ɸ	β	f	v	θ̼	ð̼	θ	ð	θ̠	ð̠	ɹ̠̊˔	ɹ̠˔	ɻ̊˔	ɻ˔	ç	ʝ	x	ɣ	χ	ʁ	ħ	ʕ	h	ɦ
Approximant		β̞		ʋ				ð̞		ɹ		ɹ̠		ɻ		j		ɰ						˷
Tap/flap		ⱱ̟		ⱱ					ɾ̥	ɾ			ɽ̊	ɽ						ɢ̆		ʡ̆		
Trill	ʙ̥	ʙ							r̥	r		r̠	ɽ̊r̥	ɽr					ʀ̥	ʀ	ʜ	ʢ		
Lateral affricate									tɬ	dɮ			tꞎ	d𝼅	c𝼆	ɟʎ̝	k𝼄	ɡʟ̝						
Lateral fricative							ɬ̪		ɬ	ɮ			ꞎ	𝼅	𝼆	ʎ̝	𝼄	ʟ̝						
Lateral approximant								l̪	l̥	l		l̠	ɭ̊	ɭ	ʎ̥	ʎ	ʟ̥	ʟ		ʟ̠				
Lateral tap/flap									ɺ̥	ɺ			𝼈̊	𝼈		ʎ̆		ʟ̆						

		BL	LD	D	A	PA	RF	P	V	U
Implosive	Voiced	ɓ			ɗ		ᶑ	ʄ	ɠ	ʛ
Implosive	Voiceless	ɓ̥			ɗ̥		ᶑ̊	ʄ̊	ɠ̊	ʛ̥
Ejective	Stop	pʼ			tʼ		ʈʼ	cʼ	kʼ	qʼ
Ejective	Affricate		p̪fʼ	tθʼ	tsʼ	tʃʼ	tʂʼ	tɕʼ	kxʼ	qχʼ
Ejective	Fricative	ɸʼ	fʼ	θʼ	sʼ	ʃʼ	ʂʼ	ɕʼ	xʼ	χʼ
Ejective	Lateral affricate				tɬʼ			c𝼆ʼ	k𝼄ʼ	q𝼄ʼ
Ejective	Lateral fricative				ɬʼ					
Click (top: velar; bottom: uvular)	Tenuis	kʘ qʘ		kǀ qǀ	kǃ qǃ		k𝼊 q𝼊	kǂ qǂ		
Click (top: velar; bottom: uvular)	Voiced	ɡʘ ɢʘ		ɡǀ ɢǀ	ɡǃ ɢǃ		ɡ𝼊 ɢ𝼊	ɡǂ ɢǂ		
Click (top: velar; bottom: uvular)	Nasal	ŋʘ ɴʘ		ŋǀ ɴǀ	ŋǃ ɴǃ		ŋ𝼊 ɴ𝼊	ŋǂ ɴǂ	ʞ	
Click (top: velar; bottom: uvular)	Tenuis lateral				kǁ qǁ					
Click (top: velar; bottom: uvular)	Voiced lateral				ɡǁ ɢǁ					
Click (top: velar; bottom: uvular)	Nasal lateral				ŋǁ ɴǁ					
