= Yiddish phonology =

Sounds used in the Yiddish language

There is significant phonological variation among the various Yiddish dialects. The description that follows is of a modern Standard Yiddish that was devised during the early 20th century and is frequently encountered in pedagogical contexts.

== Consonants ==
Yiddish consonants
		Labial	Alveolar		Postalveolar		Palatal	Velar/ Uvular	Glottal
		Labial	hard	soft	hard	soft	Palatal	Velar/ Uvular	Glottal
Nasal		m	n	(nʲ)				(ŋ)	
Plosive	voiceless	p	t					k	(ʔ)
Plosive	voiced	b	d					ɡ	
Affricate	voiceless		ts	(tsʲ)	tʃ	(tʃʲ)			
Affricate	voiced		dz	(dzʲ)	dʒ	(dʒʲ)			
Fricative	voiceless	f	s	(sʲ)	ʃ			χ	h
Fricative	voiced	v	z	(zʲ)	(ʒ)			(ɣ)	
Rhotic			r						
Approximant	median						j		
Approximant	lateral		l				(ʎ)		

- /m, p, b/ are bilabial, whereas /f, v/ are labiodental.
- The /l – ʎ/ contrast has collapsed in some speakers.
- The palatalized coronals /nʲ, tsʲ, dzʲ, tʃʲ, dʒʲ, sʲ, zʲ/ appear primarily in Slavic loanwords. The phonemic status of these palatalised consonants, as well as any other affricates, is unclear.
- /k, ɡ/ and [ŋ] are velar, whereas /j, ʎ/ are palatal.
  - [ŋ] is an allophone of /n/ after /k, ɡ/, and it can only be syllabic [ŋ̍].
  - [ɣ] is an allophone of /χ/ before /b, d, ɡ, v, z, ʒ/.
- The phonetic realization of /χ/ and /nʲ/ is unclear:
  - In the case of /χ/, Kleine (2003) puts it in the "velar" column, but consistently uses a symbol denoting a voiceless uvular fricative ⟨χ⟩ to transcribe it.
  - In the case of /nʲ/, Kleine (2003) puts it in the "palatalized" column. This can mean that it is either palatalized alveolar [nʲ] or alveolo-palatal [ɲ̟]. /ʎ/ may actually also be alveolo-palatal [ʎ̟], rather than just palatal.
- The rhotic /r/ can be either alveolar or uvular, either a trill [r ~ ʀ] or, more commonly, a flap/tap [ɾ ~ ʀ̆].
- The glottal stop [ʔ] appears only as an intervocalic separator.

As in the Slavic languages with which Yiddish was long in contact (Russian, Belarusian, Polish, and Ukrainian), but unlike German, voiceless stops have little to no aspiration; unlike many such languages, voiced stops are not devoiced in final position. Moreover, Yiddish has regressive voicing assimilation, so that, for example, זאָגט /zɔɡt/ ('says') is pronounced [zɔkt] and הקדמה /hakˈdɔmɜ/ ('foreword') is pronounced [haɡˈdɔmɜ].

== Vowels ==
The vowel phonemes of Standard Yiddish are:

Yiddish monophthongs
	Front	Central	Back
Close	ɪ		ʊ
Open-mid	ɛ	ɜ	ɔ
Open	a		

- /ɪ, ʊ/ are typically near-close [ɪ, ʊ] respectively, but the height of /ɪ/ may vary freely between a higher and lower allophone.
- /ɜ/ appears only in unstressed syllables.

Diphthongs
Front nucleus	Central nucleus	Back nucleus
ɛɪ	aɪ	ɔɪ

- The last two diphthongs may be realized as [aɛ] and [ɔɜ], respectively.

In addition, the sonorants /l/ and /n/ can function as syllable nuclei:

- אײזל /ˈɛɪzl̩/ 'donkey'
- אָװנט /ˈɔvn̩t/ 'evening'

[m] and [ŋ] appear as syllable nuclei as well, but only as allophones of /n/, after bilabial consonants and dorsal consonants, respectively.

The syllabic sonorants are always unstressed.

=== Dialectal variation ===
Stressed vowels in the Yiddish dialects may be understood by considering their common origins in the Proto-Yiddish sound system. Yiddish linguistic scholarship uses a system developed by Max Weinreich in 1960 to indicate the descendent diaphonemes of the Proto-Yiddish stressed vowels.

Each Proto-Yiddish vowel is given a unique two-digit identifier, and its reflexes use it as a subscript, for example Southeastern o_{11} is the vowel /o/, descended from Proto-Yiddish */a/. The first digit indicates Proto-Yiddish quality (1-=*[a], 2-=*[e], 3-=*[i], 4-=*[o], 5-=*[u]), and the second refers to quantity or diphthongization (−1=short, −2=long, −3=short but lengthened early in the history of Yiddish, −4=diphthong, −5=special length occurring only in Proto-Yiddish vowel 25).

Vowels 23, 33, 43 and 53 have the same reflexes as 22, 32, 42 and 52 in all Yiddish dialects, but they developed distinct values in Middle High German; Katz (1987) argues that they should be collapsed with the −2 series, leaving only 13 in the −3 series.

Genetic sources of Yiddish dialect vowels
		Netherlandic		Polish		Lithuanian	
		Front	Back	Front	Back	Front	Back
Close	short	i _{31}	u _{52}	i _{31/51}	u _{12/13}	i _{31/32}	u _{51/52}
Close	long	iː _{32}	—N/a	iː _{32/52}	—N/a	—N/a	
Close-mid	short	—N/a	o _{51}	—N/a		—N/a	
Close-mid	long	eː _{25}	oː _{12}	eː ~ ej _{25}	oː ~ ou _{54}	—N/a	
Close-mid	diphthong	—N/a		eː ~ ej _{25}	oː ~ ou _{54}	ej _{22/24/42/44}	—N/a
Open-mid	short	ɛ _{21}	ɔ _{41}	ɛ _{21}	ɔ _{41}	ɛ _{21/25}	ɔ _{12/13/41}
Open-mid	diphthong	ɛj _{22/34}	ɔu _{42/54}	—N/a	ɔj _{42/44}	—N/a	ɔj _{54}
Open	short	a _{11/13}		a _{11}		a _{11}	
Open	long	aː _{24/44}		aː _{34}		—N/a	
Open	diphthong	—N/a		aj _{22/24}		aj _{34}	

== Comparison with German ==
In vocabulary of Germanic origin, the differences between Standard German and Yiddish pronunciation are mainly in the vowels and diphthongs. All varieties of Yiddish lack the German front rounded vowels /œ, øː/ and /ʏ, yː/, having merged them with /ɛ, e:/ and /ɪ, i:/, respectively.

Diphthongs have also undergone divergent developments in German and Yiddish. Where Standard German has merged the Middle High German diphthong ei and long vowel î to /aɪ/, Yiddish has maintained the distinction between them; and likewise, the Standard German /ɔʏ/ corresponds to both the MHG diphthong öu and the long vowel iu, which in Yiddish have merged with their unrounded counterparts ei and î, respectively. Lastly, the Standard German /aʊ/ corresponds to both the MHG diphthong ou and the long vowel û, but in Yiddish, they have not merged. Although Standard Yiddish does not distinguish between those two diphthongs and renders both as /ɔɪ/, the distinction becomes apparent when the two diphthongs undergo Germanic umlaut, such as in forming plurals:

Singular			Plural	
MHG	Standard German	Standard Yiddish	Standard German	Standard Yiddish
boum	Baum /baʊ̯m/	בױם /bɔɪm/	Bäume /ˈbɔʏ̯mə/	בײמער /bɛɪmɜr/
bûch	Bauch /baʊ̯x/	בױך /bɔɪχ/	Bäuche /ˈbɔʏ̯çə/	בײַכער /baɪχɜr/

The vowel length distinctions of German do not exist in the Northeastern (Lithuanian) varieties of Yiddish, which form the phonetic basis for Standard Yiddish. In those varieties, the vowel qualities in most long/short vowel pairs diverged and so the phonemic distinction has remained.

Yiddish has some coincidental resemblances to Dutch in vowel phonology, which extend even to orthography, such as Dutch ij versus Yiddish tsvey judn, both pronounced /ɛɪ/; and Dutch ui (pronounced /œy/) versus Yiddish vov yud (/ɔj/). For example, the Yiddish "to be" is זײַן, which orthographically matches Dutch zijn more than German sein, or Yiddish הױז, "house", versus Dutch huis (plural huizen). Along with the pronunciation of Dutch g as /ɣ/, Yiddish is said to sound closer to Dutch than to German because of that even though its structure is closer to High German.

There are consonantal differences between German and Yiddish. Yiddish deaffricates the Middle High German voiceless labiodental affricate /pf/ to /f/ initially (as in פֿונט funt, but this pronunciation is also quasi-standard throughout northern and central Germany); /pf/ surfaces as an unshifted /p/ medially or finally (as in עפּל /ɛpl/ and קאָפּ /kɔp/). Additionally, final voiced stops appear in Standard Yiddish but not Northern Standard German.

M. Weinreich's diaphoneme	Pronunciation						Examples		
M. Weinreich's diaphoneme	Middle High German	Standard German	Western Yiddish	Northeastern ("Litvish")	Central ("Poylish")	South-Eastern ("Ukrainish")	MHG	Standard German	Standard Yiddish
A_{1}	a in closed syllable	short a /a/	/a/	/a/	/a/	/a~ɔ/	machen, glat	machen, glatt /ˈmaxən, ɡlat/	מאַכן, גלאַט /maχn, ɡlat/
A_{2}	â	long a /aː/	/oː/	/ɔ/	/uː/	/u/	slâfen	schlafen /ˈʃlaːfən/	שלאָפֿן /ˈʃlɔfn̩/
A_{3}	a in open syllable	long a /aː/	/aː/	/ɔ/	/uː/	/u/	vater, sagen	Vater, sagen /ˈfaːtɐ, zaːɡən/	פֿאָטער, זאָגן /ˈfɔtɜr, zɔɡn̩/
E_{1}	e, ä, æ, all in closed syllable	short ä and short e /ɛ/	/ɛ/	/ɛ/	/ɛ/	/ɛ/	becker, mensch	Bäcker, Mensch /ˈbɛkɐ, mɛnʃ/	בעקער, מענטש /ˈbɛkɜr, mɛntʃ/
E_{1}	ö in closed syllable	short ö /œ/	/ɛ/	/ɛ/	/ɛ/	/ɛ/	töhter	Töchter /ˈtœçtɐ/	טעכטער /ˈtɛχtɜr/
E_{5}	ä and æ in open syllable	long ä /ɛː/	/eː/	/ɛ/	/eː~eɪ/	/eɪ~ɪ/	kæse	Käse /ˈkɛːzə/	קעז /kɛz/
E_{2/3}	e in open syllable, and ê	long e /eː/	/ɛɪ/	/eɪ/	/aɪ/	/eɪ/	esel	Esel /eːzl̩/	אײזל /ɛɪzl/
E_{2/3}	ö in open syllable, and œ	long ö /øː/	/ɛɪ/	/eɪ/	/aɪ/	/eɪ/	schœne	schön /ʃøːn/	שײן /ʃɛɪn/
I_{1}	i in closed syllable	short i /ɪ/	/ɪ/	/ɪ/	/ɪ/	/ɪ/	niht	nicht /nɪçt/	נישט /nɪʃt/
I_{1}	ü in closed syllable	short ü /ʏ/	/ɪ/	/ɪ/	/ɪ/	/ɪ/	brück, vünf	Brücke, fünf /ˈbʁʏkə, fʏnf/	בריק, פֿינף /brɪk, fɪnf/
I_{2/3}	i in open syllable, and ie	long i /iː/	/iː/	/ɪ/	/iː/	/iː/	liebe	Liebe /ˈliːbə/	ליבע /ˈlɪbɜ/
I_{2/3}	ü in open syllable, and üe	long ü /yː/	/iː/	/ɪ/	/iː/	/iː/	grüene	grün /ɡʁyːn/	גרין /ɡrɪn/
O_{1}	o in closed syllable	short o /ɔ/	/ɔ/	/ɔ/	/ɔ/	/ɔ/	kopf, scholn	Kopf, sollen /kɔpf, ˈzɔlən/	קאָפּ, זאָלן /kɔp, zɔln/
O_{2/3}	o in open syllable, and ô	long o /oː/	/ɔu/	/eɪ/	/ɔɪ/	/ɔɪ/	hôch, schône	hoch, schon /hoːx, ʃoːn/	הױך, שױן /hɔɪχ, ʃɔɪn/
U_{1}	u in closed syllable	short u /ʊ/	/ʊ/	/ʊ/	/ɪ/	/ɪ/	hunt	Hund /hʊnt/	הונט /hʊnt/
U_{2/3}	u in open syllable, and uo	long u /uː/	/uː/	/ʊ/	/iː/	/iː/	buoch	Buch /buːx/	בוך /bʊχ/
E_{4}	ei	ei /aɪ/	/aː/	/eɪ/	/aɪ/	/eɪ/	vleisch	Fleisch /flaɪ̯ʃ/	פֿלײש /flɛɪʃ/
I_{4}	î	ei /aɪ/	/aɪ/	/aɪ/	/aː/	/a/	mîn	mein /maɪ̯n/	מײַן /maɪn/
O_{4}	ou	au /aʊ/	/aː/	/eɪ/	/ɔɪ/	/ɔɪ/	ouh, koufen	auch, kaufen /aʊ̯x, ˈkaʊ̯fən/	אױך, קױפֿן /ɔɪχ, kɔɪfn/
U_{4}	û	au /aʊ/	/ɔu/	/ɔɪ/	/oː~ou/	/ou~u/	hûs	Haus /haʊ̯s/	הױז /hɔɪz/
(E_{4})	öu	äu and eu /ɔʏ/	/aː/	/eɪ/	/aɪ/	/eɪ/	vröude	Freude /ˈfʁɔʏ̯də/	פֿרײד /frɛɪd/
(I_{4})	iu	äu and eu /ɔʏ/	/aɪ/	/aɪ/	/aː/	/a/	diutsch	Deutsch /dɔʏ̯t͡ʃ/	דײַטש /daɪtʃ/

== Comparison with Hebrew ==
The pronunciation of vowels in Yiddish words of Hebrew origin is similar to Ashkenazi Hebrew but not identical. The most prominent difference is kamatz gadol in closed syllables being pronounced same as patah in Yiddish but the same as any other kamatz in Ashkenazi Hebrew. Also, Hebrew features no reduction of unstressed vowels and so the given name Jochebed יוֹכֶבֶֿד would be /jɔɪˈχɛvɛd/ in Ashkenazi Hebrew but /ˈjɔχvɜd/ in Standard Yiddish.

M. Weinreich's diaphoneme	Tiberian vocalization	Pronunciation			Examples
M. Weinreich's diaphoneme	Tiberian vocalization	Western Yiddish	Northeastern ("Litvish")	Central ("Poylish")	Standard Yiddish
A_{1}	patah and kamatz gadol in closed syllable	/a/	/a/	/a/	אַלְמָן, כְּתָבֿ /ˈalmɜn, ksav/
A_{2}	kamatz gadol in open syllable	/oː/	/ɔ/	/uː/	פָּנִים /ˈpɔnɜm/
E_{1}	tzere and segol in closed syllable; hataf segol	/ɛ/	/ɛ/	/ɛ/	גֵּט, חֶבְֿרָה, אֱמֶת /gɛt, ˈχɛvrɜ, ˈɛmɜs/
E_{5}	segol in open syllable	/eː/	/ɛ/	/eː~eɪ/	גֶּפֶֿן /ˈgɛfɜn/
E_{2/3}	tzere in open syllable	/ɛɪ/	/eɪ/	/aɪ/	סֵדֶר /ˈsɛɪdɜr/
I_{1}	hiriq in closed syllable	/ɪ/	/ɪ/	/ɪ/	טיִף /tɪf/
I_{2/3}	hiriq in open syllable	/iː/	/ɪ/	/iː/	מְדִינָה /mɜˈdɪnɜ/
O_{1}	holam and kamatz katan in closed syllable	/ɔ/	/ɔ/	/ɔ/	חָכְמָה, עוֹף /ˈχɔχmɜ, ɔf/
O_{2/3}	holam in open syllable	/ɔu/	/eɪ/	/ɔɪ/	סוֹחֵר /ˈsɔɪχɜr/
U_{1}	kubutz and shuruk in closed syllable	/ʊ/	/ʊ/	/ɪ/	מוּם /mʊm/
U_{2/3}	kubutz and shuruk in open syllable	/uː/	/ʊ/	/iː/	שׁוּרָה /ˈʃʊrɜ/

Patah in open syllable, as well as hataf patah, are unpredictably split between A_{1} and A_{2}: קַדַּחַת, נַחַת /kaˈdɔχɜs, ˈnaχɜs/; חֲלוֹם, חֲתֻנָּה /ˈχɔlɜm, ˈχasɜnɜ/.

== Bibliography ==
- Birnbaum, Solomon A. (1979). Yiddish: A Survey and a Grammar. Toronto: University of Toronto Press. ISBN 0-8020-5382-3.
- Herzog, Marvin, et al. ed., YIVO, The Language and Culture Atlas of Ashkenazic Jewry, 3 vols., Max Niemeyer Verlag, Tübingen, 1992–2000, ISBN 3-484-73013-7.
- Jacobs, Neil G. (2005). Yiddish: A Linguistic Introduction. Cambridge: Cambridge University Press. ISBN 0-521-77215-X.
- Katz, Dovid (1978). Genetic Notes on Netherlandic Yiddish Vocalism (PDF).
- Katz, Dovid (1987). Grammar of the Yiddish Language. London: Duckworth. ISBN 0-7156-2162-9.
- Kleine, Ane (2003). "Standard Yiddish". Journal of the International Phonetic Association. 33 (2): 261–265. doi:10.1017/S0025100303001385.
