= Bengali phonology =

Phonology of the Bengali language

The phonology of Bengali, like that of its neighbouring Eastern Indo-Aryan languages, is characterised by a wide variety of diphthongs and inherent back vowels (both /o/ and /ɔ/).

== Phonemic inventory ==
Standard Bangladeshi Bengali vowel chart, from Khan (2010:222)

Phonemically, Bengali features 29 consonants, 7 oral vowels (8 if non-native /ʌ/ is counted), and up to 7 nasalized vowels. In the tables below, the sounds are given in IPA.

Oral vowels
	Front	Central	Back
Close	i		u (Note: The phonetic quality of /u/ may also be a fully back near-close rounded vowel [ʊ].) (Note: The semivowels /o̯ u̯/ may be merged as [w] as a result of fortition, especially in loan words e.g. ওয়াদা [wad̪a~o̯ad̪a] 'promise', উইলিয়াম [wiliam~u̯iliam] 'William'.)
Close-mid	e		o
Open-mid	æ~ɛ (Note: /æ/ never occurs outside of the initial syllable in native words, as it was originally and allophone of word-initial /e/ in some that later became phonemic via syncope. An example would be the word for "alike", একই, original [ækoi̯] but now [æki]. of The main exceptions are when prefixes added to words starting জ্ঞা /ggæ/ (pronounced [gæ] when no prefixes are added but [gːæ] after a prefix is added). An example would be the word বিজ্ঞান /big.gæn/ [bigːæn] "science", a combination of the prefix বি- /bi/ (denoting deliberation, distinction, order or opposition) to the word জ্ঞান /ggæn/ [gæn] "knowledge". Some may choose to pronounce /æ/ in this environment as /a/, giving rise to the pronunciations [gan] (homophonous with গান "song") & [bigːan]. Examples of non-syllable initial /æ/ in this environment are rarer when the word doesn't start with জ্ঞা, but they do exist. (অন্যায় /ɔn.næe̯/ [ɔnːæe̯] "Injustice" from অ- /ɔ/ (denoting negation) & ন্যায় /nnæe̯/ [næe̯] "justice"). The vowel is usually pronounced as a near-open [æ] but may also be pronounced and transcribed in IPA as open-mid [ɛ], particularly in Dhaka.)	(ʌ) (Note: /ʌ/ is only found English loanwords containing the vowel /ʌ/, and is merged by most speakers with /a/ & by some as /ɔ/.)	ɔ
Open		a (Note: In onomatopoeias and polysyllabic words, /a/ is phonetically realised as the vowel [ɐ]. In monosyllabic words, /a/ is realised as the more opened vowel [ä~äː].)	

Nasal vowels (as applicable)
	Front	Central	Back
Close	ĩ		ũ
Close-mid	ẽ		õ
Open-mid	(æ̃~ɛ̃) (Note: Bengali is usually said to have 7 nasal vowels. However, whilst /æ̃~ɛ̃/ and /ɔ̃/ do not have minimal pairs between them and their oral counterparts, they are still phonetically distinct, which makes their phonemic status hard to define. Furthermore, nasal vowels are either not phonemic or lacking entirely in several dialects of Bengali, including the majority of eastern dialects, i.e., those spoken primarily in Bangladesh.)		(ɔ̃)
Open		ã	

Consonants
			Labial	Dental/ Alveolar	Retroflex (Note: True retroflex (murdhonno) consonants are not found in Bengali. They are apical postalveolar in western dialects. In other dialects, they are fronted to apico-alveolar.)	Palatal (-alveolar)	Velar	Glottal
Nasal			m	n (Note: [ɳ] may occur as an allophone of /n/ in conjuncts with retroflex stops as it was the original sound for the letter ণ while in other words it is pronounced as [n] like with the letter ন.)	(ɳ)		ŋ	
Plosive/ Affricate	voiceless	unaspirated	p	t	ʈ	tʃ (Note: Palato-alveolar affricates [tʃ] and [tʃʰ], and [dʒ] and [dʒʱ] can also be pronounced as alveolo-palatal affricates [tɕ] and [tɕʰ], and [dʑ] and [dʑʱ].)	k	
Plosive/ Affricate	voiceless	aspirated	pʰ (Note: /pʰ/ (written as ⟨ফ⟩) is phonetically realised as either an aspirated stop [pʰ] or, commonly, fricative [ɸ~f]. The fricatives can additionally occur as an allophone of /pʰ/ in foreign loan words e.g. ফ্যান [ɸæn] 'fan'.)	tʰ	ʈʰ	tʃʰ	kʰ	
Plosive/ Affricate	voiced	unaspirated	b	d	ɖ	dʒ	ɡ	
Plosive/ Affricate	voiced	aspirated (Note: The voiced aspirated (murmured) series is missing in the Eastern Bengali of Sylhet, Barak Valley, Cumilla, Tripura, Noakhali and Chittagong, where it is replaced by tone, as in Punjabi.)	bʱ (Note: /bʱ/ (written as ⟨ভ⟩) is phonetically realised as either an aspirated stop [bʱ] or, much rarely, fricative [β~v]. The fricatives can additionally occur as an allophone of /bʱ/ in foreign loan words e.g. ভিসা [βisa] 'visa'.)	dʱ	ɖʱ	dʒʱ	ɡʱ	
Fricative	voiceless			s (Note: /s/ is a phoneme for many speakers of Standard Bengali (e.g. সিরকা /sirka/ 'vinegar', অস্থির /ɔstʰir/ 'uneasy', ব্যস /bas/ or /bæs/ 'enough'). For most speakers, /s/ and /ʃ/ are phonemically distinct (আস্তে /aste/ 'softly' vs. আসতে /aʃte/ 'to come'). For some, especially in Rajshahi and Western Bengali dialects, there is no difference between স and শ, (বাস /bʌs/ 'bus' vs. বাঁশ /bas/ 'bamboo'); they have the same consonant sound. For some speakers, [s] can be analyzed as an allophone of either /ʃ/ or /tʃʰ/ ([ʃalam] for সালাম /salam/ 'greetings' or বিচ্ছিরি [bitʃːʰiri] for বিশ্রী /bisːri/ 'ugly'). Some loanwords that originally had /s/ are now pronounced with [tʃʰ] in Standard Bengali (পছন্দ pochondo [pɔtʃʰondo] 'like', compared to Persian pasand).)		ʃ		
Fricative	voiced			(z) (Note: /z/: ⟨জ⟩ and ⟨য⟩ may represent a voiced affricate /dʒ/ in Standard Bengali words of native origin, but they can also represent /z/ in foreign words and names (জাকাত /zakat/ 'zakah charity', আজিজ /aziz/ 'Aziz'). Most foreign borrowings with /z/ sound are replaced with /dʒ/, as in নামাজ /namadʒ/ 'namaz' and ডিজাইন /ɖidʒain/ 'design'. However, a native s/z opposition has developed in Chittagonian Bengali. Additionally, some loanwords that originally had [z] are now pronounced with /dʒ/ in Standard Bengali (সবজি /ʃobdʒi/ 'vegetable', from Persian sabzi).)				ɦ (Note: /ɦ/: [h] occurs in word-initial or final positions while [ɦ] occurs medially.)
Approximant			(w)	l		(j) (Note: [j] occurs in some pronunciations of Bengali vowel clusters as a result of the semivowels /e̯ i̯/ undergoing fortitional merging. This fortitional merging occurs in the same areas as the fortition /o̯ u̯/ to [w]. Examples include: নয়ন "eye" [nɔjon~nɔe̯on] ভাই "brothers" [bʱaj~bʱai̯].)		
Rhotic	unaspirated			r (Note: The /r/ phoneme is pronounced either as a voiced alveolar tap [ɾ] or voiced alveolar approximant [ɹ]. Most speakers colloquially pronounce /r/ as a tap [ɾ], although it may also very rarely be a trill [r], especially in some word-initial positions. /r/ can also occur as an approximant [ɹ], especially in some eastern dialects and sometimes in conjuncts before consonants.)	ɽ (Note: /ɽ/ originated as an allophone of /ɖ/ that occurs outside of word initial positions & the clusters /ɖɖ/ and /nɖ/ (realised phonetically as [d̠ː] & [n̠d̠] respectively), though loanwords with /ɖ/ have caused it to become phonemic. Bengali dialects make alveolar /r/ and postalveolar /ɽ/ increasingly indistinct phonemically eastwards, and it is fully realised as alveolar in eastern dialects (including the Standard Bengali dialect spoken in Dhaka), where both may be phonetically realised as either [ɾ] or [ɹ]. Thus the pairs পড়ে /pɔɽe/ 'reads'/'falls' vs. পরে /pɔre/ 'wears'/'after', and করা /kɔra/ 'do' vs. কড়া [kɔɽa] 'strict' can be homophonous.)			
Rhotic	aspirated				(ɽʱ) (Note: [ɽʱ] is a non-word initial allophone of /ɖʱ/. It is distinct phonetically only in far western Bengali dialects (and some conservative speech), and usually pronounced as either as [ɾ̠] or as the many phonetic realisations of Bengali /r/ in most dialects.)			

Although the standard form of Bengali is largely uniform across Bangladesh and India, there are a few sounds that vary in pronunciation (in addition to the myriad variations in non-standard dialects):

=== Consonant clusters ===
Native Bengali (তদ্ভব tôdbhôbo) words do not allow initial consonant clusters; the maximum syllabic structure is CVC (i.e. one vowel flanked by a consonant on each side). Many speakers of Bengali restrict their phonology to this pattern, even when using Sanskrit or English borrowings, such as গেরাম geram (CV.CVC) for গ্রাম gram (CCVC) meaning 'village' or ইস্কুল iskul / ishkul (VC.CVC) for স্কুল skul (CCVC) 'school'.

Sanskrit (তৎসম tôtśômo) words borrowed into Bengali, however, possess a wide range of clusters, expanding the maximum syllable structure to CCCVC. Some of these clusters, such as the [mr] in মৃত্যু mrittu ('death') or the [sp] in স্পষ্ট spôshṭo ('clear'), have become extremely common, and can be considered permitted consonant clusters in Bengali. English and other foreign (বিদেশী bideshi) borrowings add even more cluster types into the Bengali inventory, further increasing the syllable capacity, as commonly used loanwords such as ট্রেন ṭren ('train') and গ্লাস glash ('glass') are now included in leading Bengali dictionaries.

Final consonant clusters are rare in Bengali. Most final consonant clusters were borrowed into Bengali from English, as in লিফ্ট lifṭ ('elevator') and ব্যাংক beņk ("bank'). However, final clusters do exist in some native Bengali words, although rarely in standard pronunciation. One example of a final cluster in a standard Bengali word would be গঞ্জ gônj, which is found in names of hundreds of cities and towns across Bengal, including নবাবগঞ্জ Nôbabgônj and মানিকগঞ্জ Manikgônj. Some nonstandard varieties of Bengali make use of final clusters quite often. For example, in some Purbo (eastern) dialects, final consonant clusters consisting of a nasal and its corresponding oral stop are common, as in চান্দ chand ('moon'). The Standard Bengali equivalent of chand would be চাঁদ chãd, with a nasalized vowel instead of the final cluster.

=== Diphthongs ===
Diphthongs
IPA	Transliteration	Example
/ii̯/	ii	nii "I take"
/iu̯/	iu	biubhôl "upset"
/ei̯/	ei	dei "I give"
/eu̯/	eu	ḍheu "wave"
/æe̯/	êe	nêe "they (singular) takes"
/ai̯/	ai	pai "I find"
/ae̯/	ae	pae "they (singular) find"
/au̯/	au	pau "sliced bread"
/ao̯/	ao	pao "you find"
/ɔe̯/	ôe	nôe "they (singular) are not"
/ɔo̯/	ôo	nôo "you are not"
/oi̯/	oi	noi "I am not"
/oo̯/	oo	dhoo "you wash"
/ou̯/	ou	nouka "boat"
/ui̯/	ui	dhui "I wash"

Magadhan languages such as Bengali are known for their wide variety of diphthongs, or combinations of vowels occurring within the same syllable. Two of these, /oi̯/ and /ou̯/, are the only ones with representation in script, as ঐ and ঔ respectively. The semivowels /e̯ i̯ o̯ u̯/ may all form the glide part of a diphthong. The total number of diphthongs is not established, with bounds at 17 and 31. Several vowel combinations can be considered true monosyllabic diphthongs, made up of the main vowel (the nucleus) and the trailing vowel (the off-glide). Almost all other vowel combinations are possible, but only across two adjacent syllables, such as the disyllabic vowel combination [u.a] in কুয়া kua ('well'). As many as 25 vowel combinations can be found, but some of the more recent combinations have not passed through the stage between two syllables and a diphthongal monosyllable.

== Prosody ==
=== Stress ===
In standard Bengali, stress is predominantly initial. Bengali words are virtually all trochaic; the primary stress falls on the initial syllable of the word, while secondary stress often falls on all odd-numbered syllables thereafter, giving strings such as সহযোগিতা sahayogitā [ˈʃɔhoˌdʒoɡiˌta] ('cooperation'). The first syllable carries the greatest stress, with the third carrying a somewhat weaker stress, and all following odd-numbered syllables carrying very weak stress. However, in words borrowed from Sanskrit, the root syllable has stress, out of harmony with the situation with native Bengali words. Also, in a declarative sentence, the stress is generally lowest on the last word of the sentence.

Adding prefixes to a word typically shifts the stress to the left; for example, while the word সভ্য sabhya [ˈʃobbʱo] ('civilized') carries the primary stress on the first syllable, adding the negative prefix /ɔ-/ creates অসভ্য asabhya [ˈɔʃobbʱo] ('uncivilized'), where the primary stress is now on the newly added first syllable অ ô. Word-stress does not alter the meaning of a word and is always subsidiary to sentence-level stress.

=== Intonation ===
For Bengali words, intonation or pitch of voice have minor significance, apart from a few cases such as distinguishing between identical vowels in a diphthong. However, in sentences intonation does play a significant role. In a simple declarative sentence, most words and/or phrases in Bengali carry a rising tone, with the exception of the last word in the sentence, which only carries a low tone. This intonational pattern creates a musical tone to the typical Bengali sentence, with low and high tones alternating until the final drop in pitch to mark the end of the sentence.

In sentences involving focused words and/or phrases, the rising tones only last until the focused word; all following words carry a low tone. This intonation pattern extends to wh-questions, as wh-words are normally considered to be focused. In yes–no questions, the rising tones may be more exaggerated, and most importantly, the final syllable of the final word in the sentence takes a high falling tone instead of a flat low tone.

=== Vowel length ===
Like most Magadhan languages, vowel length is not contrastive in Bengali; all else equal, there is no meaningful distinction between a "short vowel" and a "long vowel", unlike the situation in most Indo-Aryan languages. However, when morpheme boundaries come into play, vowel length can sometimes distinguish otherwise homophonous words. This is because open monosyllables (i.e. words that are made up of only one syllable, with that syllable ending in the main vowel and not a consonant) can have somewhat longer vowels than other syllable types. For example, the vowel in caচা ('tea') can be somewhat longer than the first vowel in caṭa ('licking'), as ca is a word with only one syllable, and no final consonant. The suffix ṭa ('the') can be added to ca to form caṭa ('the tea'), and the long vowel is preserved, creating a minimal pair ([ˈtʃaʈa] vs. [ˈtʃaˑʈa]). Knowing this fact, some interesting cases of apparent vowel length distinction can be found. In general, Bengali vowels tend to stay away from extreme vowel articulation.

Furthermore, using a form of reduplication called "echo reduplication", the long vowel in ca can be copied into the reduplicant ṭa, giving caṭa ('tea and all that comes with it'). Thus, in addition to caṭa ('the tea') with a longer first vowel and caṭa ('licking') with no long vowels, we have caṭa চাটা('tea and all that comes with it') with two longer vowels.

== Regional phonological variations ==
=== Affricates and fricatives ===
In the dialects prevalent in much of eastern and south-eastern Bangladesh (Barisal, Chittagong, Dhaka and Sylhet Divisions), and Tripura and Barak Valley of India, many of the stops and affricates heard in the western and (south) central dialects are pronounced as fricatives. Western palato-alveolar and alveolo-palatal affricates চ [tɕ~tʃ], ছ [tɕʰ~tʃʰ], জ [dʑ~dʒ], ঝ [dʑʱ~dʒʱ] correspond to eastern চ় [ts~s], স [s], জ় [z~dz], য [z~zʱ]. Note that few Perso-Arabic borrowings containing the phoneme [z] are realised as such in all dialects.

The unvoiced aspirated velar stop খ [kʰ], the aspirated labial stop ফ [pʰ] and the voiced aspirated labial stop ভ [bʱ] of western-central Bengali dialects correspond to খ় [x~χ], ফ় [ɸ~f] and ভ় [b~β~b̰] in eastern Bengali. These pronunciations are more prevalent in the Sylheti variety of northeastern Bangladesh and south Assam, the variety spoken by most of the Bengali community in the United Kingdom. Note that phonemic transcriptions from left to right for eastern Bengali dialects indicate the realizations further eastwards. Retroflexes lose aspiration and variously remain like that or become alveolar. Breathy voiced stops lose breathiness. The voiced velar stop গ [g] can fricative to গ় [ɣ], and is mostly lost afterwards. The stops ঘ থ ধ ঠ ঢ are relatively stable across dialects that do not lose aspiration, remaining [gʱ t̪ʰ d̪ʱ ʈʰ ɖʰ]. The first 3 stops may be phonetically realised as affricates [gɣ t̪θ d̪ð] by a few speakers, though this is extremely rare and idiosyncratic. থ [t̪ʰ] and দ [d̪] in English loanwords fricatise to থ় [θ] and দ় respectively in the speech of educated speakers (Bengali approximates English /ð/ as দ [d̪], not ধ [d̪ʱ]), though this realisation isn't used in native words.

Many eastern Bengali dialects share phonological features with Assamese, including the debuccalisation of স, শ & ষ [ʃ] to হ [h] (but not to খ় [x]).

=== Substrate and Tibeto-Burman influence ===
The influence of older substrate and Tibeto-Burman languages on the phonology is more observable in eastern Bengali dialects, and becomes increasingly prominent eastwards. In dialects of the Mymensingh, Sylhet, Chittagong Divisions of Bangladesh (and bordering areas of Dhaka and Barishal Divisions), and Tripura and Barak Valley of India, alveolar stops are realised in place of postalveolar stops ট [t̠], ঠ [t̠ʰ], ড [d̠], and ঢ [d̠ʱ], resembling the equivalent phonemes in Southeast Asian languages such as Thai and Lao.

In the phonology of far western Bengali, the distinction between the alveolar tap র [ɾ], and postalveolar taps ড় [ɽ] and ঢ় [ɽʱ~ɽ] is clear and distinct like Indian languages further west. However, the distinction is often less clear in western and central dialects (unless in careful or conservative speech), and fully lost in eastern dialects, where both tap sounds are realised as either the alveolar tap or the alveolar approximant [ɹ], similar to Assamese ৰ, due to older substrate and Tibeto-Burman influence. Far eastern Bengali dialects tend not to distinguish aspirated voiced stops ঘ [ɡʱ], ঝ [dʑʱ] (often fricativized instead), ঢ [d̠ʱ], ধ [dʱ], and ভ [bʱ] from their unaspirated equivalents, with some dialects treating them as allophones of each other and other dialects replacing the former with the latter completely. Note that ঢ় is realised as [ɽ] but not as [ɽʱ] in all Bengali dialects (including the standard one) except for far western ones (in Jharkhand and western parts of West Bengal).

Some variants of the Bengali, particularly the Chittagonian, Noakhailla and Sylheti, have contrastive tone and so differences in pitch can distinguish words. There is also a distinction between ই and ঈ in many northern Bangladeshi Bengali dialects. ই represents the uncommon [ɪ], but ঈ the standard [i] used for both letters in most other dialects.

== See also ==
- Bengali alphabet

== Bibliography ==
- Bhattacharya, Tanmoy (2000), "Bangla (Bengali)" (PDF), in Gary, Jane; Rubino, Carl (eds.), Encyclopedia of World's Languages: Past and Present (Facts About the World's Languages), New York: WW Wilson, ISBN 978-0-8242-0970-4
- Chatterji, S.K. (1921), "Bengali Phonetics", Bulletin of the School of Oriental and African Studies, 2: 1–25, doi:10.1017/S0041977X0010179X, S2CID 246637825
- Chatterji, S.K. (1926), The Origin and Development of the Bengali Language, Calcutta University Press
- Ferguson, C.A.; Chowdhury, M. (1960), "The Phonemes of Bengali: Part 1", Language, 36 (1): 22–59, doi:10.2307/410622, JSTOR 410622
- Hayes, B.; Lahiri, A. (1991), "Bengali intonational phonology", Natural Language & Linguistic Theory, 9: 47, doi:10.1007/BF00133326, S2CID 170109876
- Khan, Sameer ud Dowla (2010), "Bengali (Bangladeshi Standard)" (PDF), Journal of the International Phonetic Association, 40 (2): 221–225, doi:10.1017/S0025100310000071
- Masica, C. (1991), The Indo-Aryan Languages, Cambridge University Press
- Sarkar, Pabitra (1985). Bangla diswar dhoni. Kolkata: Bhasa.
