= Gmina Istebna =

Gmina in Poland

Gmina Istebna Istebna Commune
- Gmina
- Coat of arms

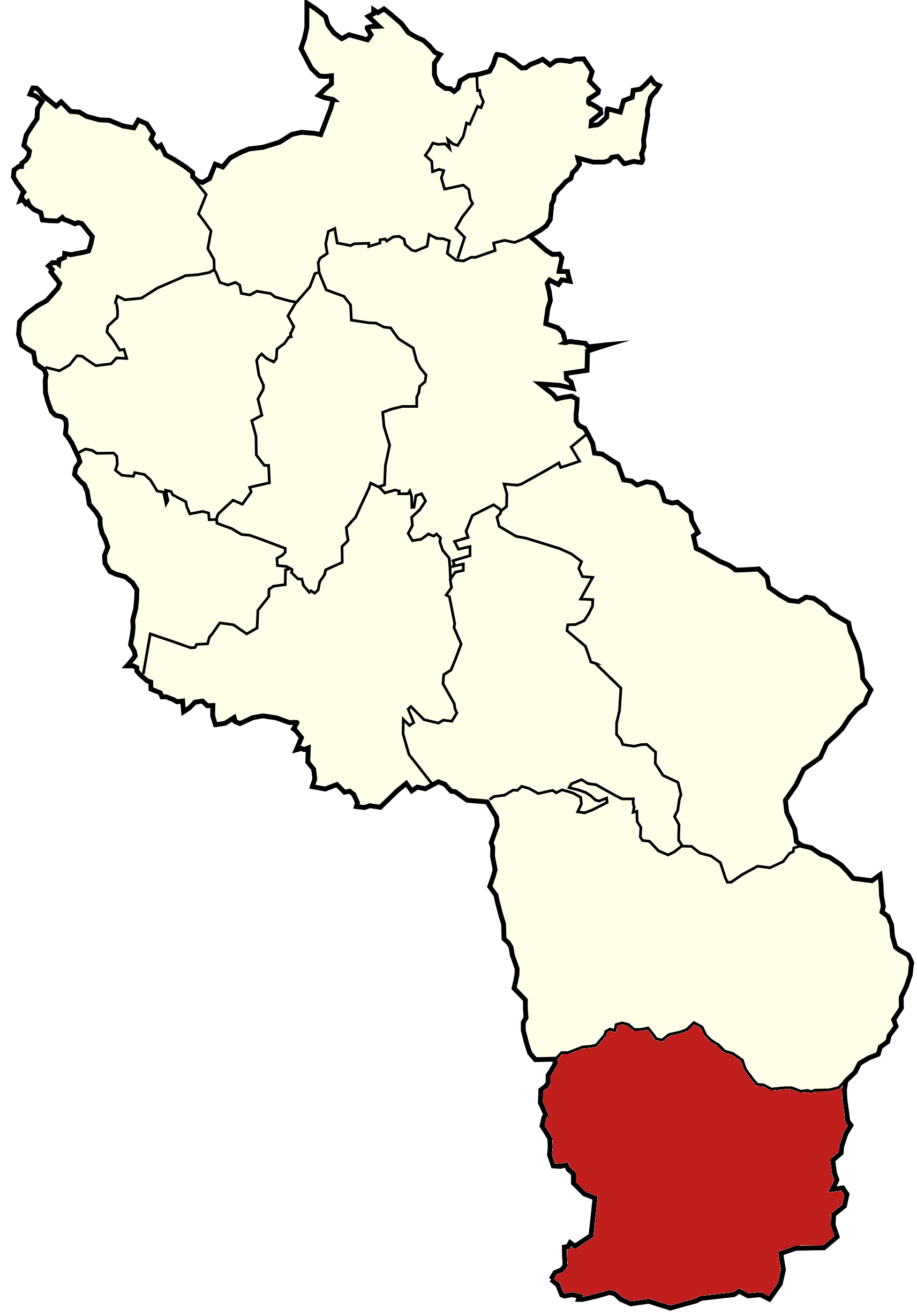
- Gmina Istebna within the Cieszyn County
- Coordinates (Istebna): 49°33′50.75″N 18°53′35.82″E
- Country: Poland
- Voivodeship: Silesian
- County: Cieszyn
- Seat: Istebna

Government
  - Mayor: Łucja Michałek

Area
  - Total: 84.25 km^{2} (32.53 sq mi)

Population (2019-06-30)
  - Total: 12,129
  - Density: 144.0/km^{2} (372.9/sq mi)
- Website: http://www.ug.istebna.pl/

Gmina Istebna is a rural gmina (administrative district) in Cieszyn County, Silesian Voivodeship, in southern Poland, in the historical region of Cieszyn Silesia. Its seat is the village of Istebna.

The gmina covers an area of 84.25 square kilometres (32.5 sq mi), and as of 2019 its total population is 12,129.

== Neighbouring gminas ==
Gmina Istebna is bordered by the gminas of Milówka, Rajcza and Wisła. It also borders the Czech Republic and Slovakia.

== Twin towns – sister cities ==
Gmina Istebna is twinned with:

- Trzebiatów, Poland
