= Gha =

Letter in mostly Turkic-Latin script

- Ƣ ƣ
- ğ

Usage
- Writing system: Latin script
- Type: Alphabetic
- Language of origin: Azerbaijani language
- Sound values: [ɣ] [ʁ]
- In Unicode: U+01A2, U+01A3
- Alphabetical position: 18 (after Q)

History
Development
O34
      - Ϙ ϙ
        - 𐌒
          - Q
            - Ƣ ƣ
- Time period: ~1900 to 1983
- Sisters: Q Φ φ Փ փ Ֆ ֆ
- Transliterations: ğ, q, g, gh, Ғ
- Variations: ğ

Other
- Writing direction: Left-to-right

The letter Ƣ (minuscule: ƣ), called gha, was used in the Latin orthographies of various, mostly Turkic languages, as part of the early Soviet Jaꞑalif orthographies. It was also later included in the Chinese pinyin-based alphabets for Kazakh and Uyghur until 1983. It usually represents a voiced velar fricative [ɣ] but is sometimes used for a voiced uvular fricative [ʁ]. Except for the Uyghur New Script, which still sees limited use, all orthographies that used the letter have been phased out.

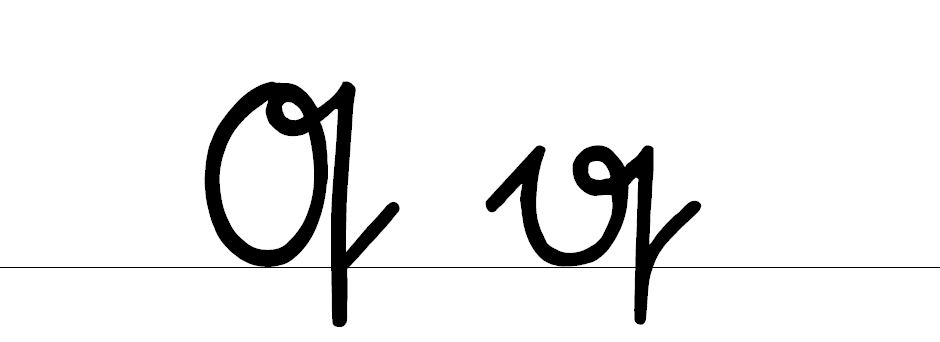
Letters Q and q of Sütterlin script

Historically, it is derived from a handwritten form of the small Latin letter ⟨q⟩ around 1900. The majuscule is then based on the minuscule. Its use for [ɣ] stems from the linguistic tradition of representing such sounds (and similar ones) by q in Turkic languages and in transcriptions of Arabic or Persian (compare kaf and qaf).

In alphabetical order, it comes between G and H.

== Modern replacements ==
Language	Letter
Abaza	ГЪ, гъ
Abkhaz	Ҕ, ҕ/Ӷ, ӷ
Avar	ГЪ, гъ
Azerbaijani	Ğ, ğ
Bashkir	Ғ, ғ
Crimean Tatar	Ğ, ğ (Latin), ГЪ, гъ (Cyrillic)
Dargin (literary)	ГЪ, гъ
Dungan	Р, р
Kabardian	ГЪ, гъ (Cyrillic), Ğ, ğ (Latin)
Karachay-Balkar	ГЪ, гъ
Karaim	ГЪ, гъ (Cyrillic), G, g (Latin)
Karakalpak	Ǵ, ǵ (Latin), Ғ, ғ (Cyrillic)
Kazakh	Ğ, ğ (Latin), Ғ, ғ (Cyrillic), ع (Arabic)
Khakas	Ғ, ғ
Kumyk	ГЪ, гъ
Kurdish	غ (Arabic), x/ẍ (Latin)
Kyrgyz	Г, г (Cyrillic), ع (Arabic)
Lak	ГЪ, гъ
Laz	ღ (Georgian), Ğ, ğ (Latin)
Lezgi	ГЪ, гъ
Nogai	Г, г
Tajik	Ғ, ғ
Talysh	Ğ, ğ (Latin), غ (Persian), Ғ, ғ (Cyrillic)
Tat	Ğ, ğ (Latin), ГЪ, гъ (Cyrillic)
Tatar	Г, г (Cyrillic), Ğ, ğ (Latin)
Tsakhur	ГЪ, гъ (Cyrillic), Ğ, ğ (Latin)
Turkmen	G, g
Tuvan	Г, г
Udin	Ğ, ğ (Latin), ГЪ, гъ (Cyrillic)
Urum	Ґ, ґ; Ғ, ғ
Uyghur	غ (Arabic), Ғ, ғ (Cyrillic), Gh, gh (Latin)
Uzbek	Ğ, ğ; Gʻ, gʻ (Latin), Ғ, ғ (Cyrillic)
Yakut	Ҕ, ҕ

== Unicode ==
In Unicode, the majuscule Ƣ is encoded in the Latin Extended-B block at U+01A2 and the minuscule ƣ is encoded at U+01A3. The assigned names, "LATIN CAPITAL LETTER OI" and "LATIN SMALL LETTER OI" respectively, are acknowledged by the Unicode Consortium to be mistakes, as gha is unrelated to the letters O and I. The Unicode Consortium therefore has provided the character name aliases "LATIN CAPITAL LETTER GHA" and "LATIN SMALL LETTER GHA".

== In popular culture ==
Thomas Pynchon's novel Gravity's Rainbow features an episode purporting to be the story of a Soviet officer, Tchitcherine, dispatched to Kirghizstan to serve on a committee tasked with devising an alphabet for the Kyrgyz language. Tchitcherine's particular contribution is the invention of the letter Ƣ.
