= Ǧ =

Latin letter G with caron

G with caron
- Ǧ ǧ
- ğ, ĝ, ḡ, ġ, ǥ, ǵ, g̃, ģ, ɠ

Usage
- Writing system: Latin script
- Type: Alphabetic
- Language of origin: Czechoslovak language
- Sound values: [ɟ͡ʝ], [g], [ɣ], [q], [d͡ʒ], [ʁ]
- In Unicode: U+01E6, U+01E7

History
Development
(speculated origin)
  T14
          - Γ γ
            - 𐌂
              - C
                - G
                  - Ǧ ǧ
- Time period: 16th century to present
- Descendants: • Ğ • Ġ
- Sisters: G Ғ Ґ Ҕ Ӻ چ غ ገ ࠂ ג Ð
- Variations: ğ, ĝ, ḡ, ġ, ǥ, ǵ, g̃, ģ, ɠ

Other
- Associated graphs: ğ, ĝ, ḡ, ġ, ǥ, ǵ, g̃, ģ, ɠ
- Writing direction: Left-to-Right

Ǧ (minuscule: ǧ), called G with caron, is a letter used in several Latin orthographies.

== Usage ==
In the Romani and Skolt Sami languages, it represents the palatalized g [ɟ͡ʝ].

It has also been used in Czech and Slovak orthographies until the middle of the 19th century to represent a voiced velar plosive (IPA: [g]; the English hard G-sound), whereas a regular ⟨G⟩ stood for a voiced palatal approximant (IPA: [j]; the English consonantal Y-sound).

In the Berber Latin and Resian alphabets, ⟨ǧ⟩ is pronounced as a voiced postalveolar affricate (IPA: [d͡ʒ]; an English J-sound).

In Lakota, ⟨ǧ⟩ represents a voiced uvular fricative (IPA: [ʁ]; an R-sound pronounced back in the throat)

In Heiltsuk, it represents a plain uvular plosive [q].

In the DIN 31635 Arabic transliteration, it represents the letter Ǧīm ⟨ﺝ⟩.

In Latvian, ⟨ǧ⟩ is also used as a handwritten form of ⟨ģ⟩, particularly in cursive writing.

== Computing codes ==
Character information
Preview	Ǧ		ǧ	
Unicode name	LATIN CAPITAL LETTER G WITH CARON		LATIN SMALL LETTER G WITH CARON	
Encodings	decimal	hex	dec	hex
Unicode	486	U+01E6	487	U+01E7
UTF-8	199 166	C7 A6	199 167	C7 A7
Numeric character reference	&#486;	&#x1E6;	&#487;	&#x1E7;

== See also ==
- Ğ (with breve)
