= Azerbaijani alphabet =

Scripts used to write the Azerbaijani language

Azerbaijani Latin alphabet Latın qrafikalı Azərbaycan əlifbası
- Script type: Alphabet
- Period: 1991 – present
- Languages: Azerbaijani

Related scripts
- Parent systems: Egyptian hieroglyphs: Proto-Sinaitic; Phoenician alphabet; Greek alphabet; Latin alphabet; Turkish alphabet; Azerbaijani Latin alphabet

Unicode
- Unicode range: subset of Latin (U+0000...U+02AF)

The Azerbaijani alphabet is the foundation of the written Azerbaijani language. The alphabet can be written in three scripts: Latin, Arabic or Cyrillic. The Azerbaijani language has been written in the Arabic script since as early as the 16th century in the Safavid Empire. Under the rule of the Soviet Union, prior to Azerbaijani independence in 1991, the Cyrillic script was used. After independence, Azerbaijan chose to utilise the Latin script. In the Dagestan Republic of Russia, Azerbaijani is still written in Cyrillic.

== Azerbaijani Latin script ==
The Azerbaijani alphabet in Latin script consists of 32 letters.

Azerbaijani Latin alphabet
Uppercase
A	B	C	Ç	D	E	Ə	F	G	Ğ	H	X	I	İ	J	K
Q	L	M	N	O	Ö	P	R	S	Ş	T	U	Ü	V	Y	Z
Lowercase
a	b	c	ç	d	e	ə	f	g	ğ	h	x	ı	i	j	k
q	l	m	n	o	ö	p	r	s	ş	t	u	ü	v	y	z
Names
a	be	ce	çe	de	e	ə	fe	ge	ğe	he	xe	ı	i	je	ke
qe	el	em	en	o	ö	pe	er	se	şe	te	u	ü	ve	ye	ze

=== Latin script reforms ===
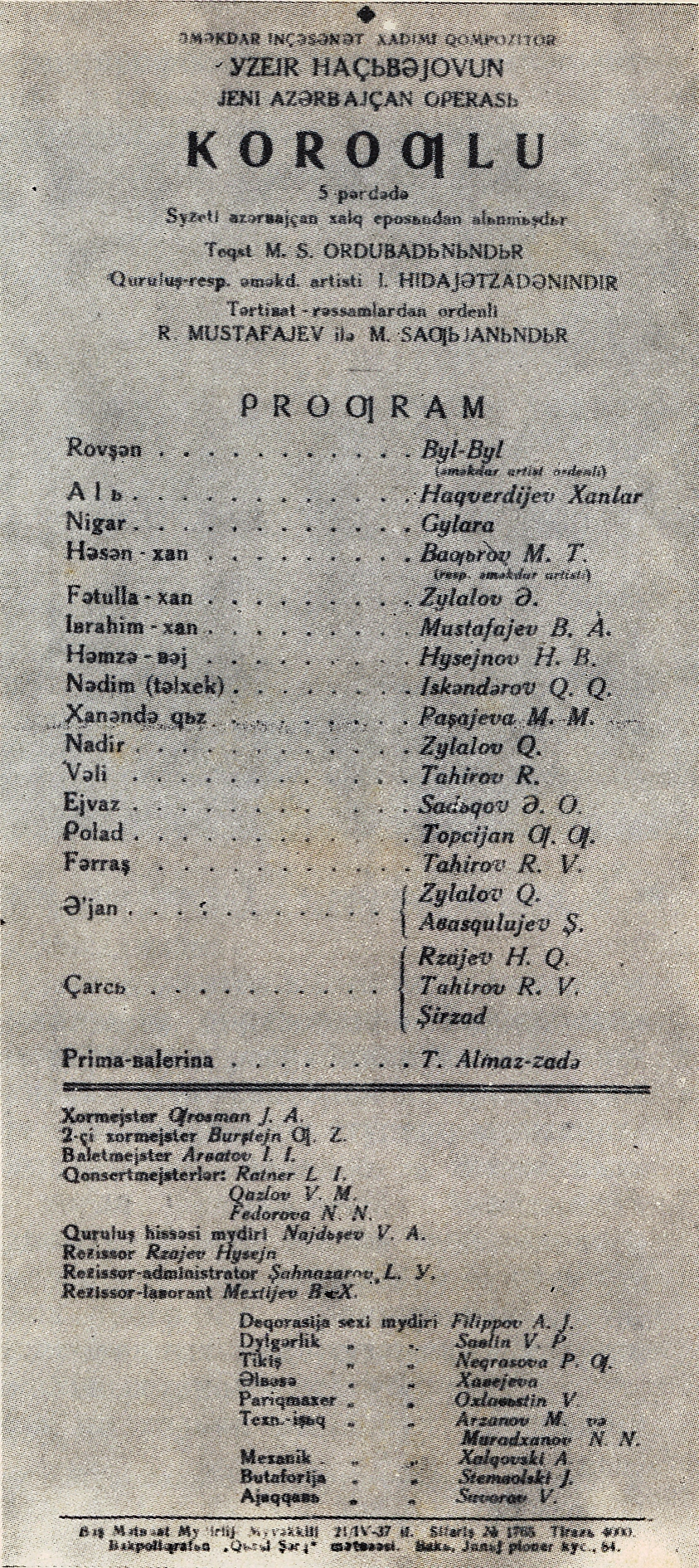
1937 program for the opera Koroğlu, in the old Latin script

==== Akhundov ====
In the 19th century, intellectuals such as Mirza Fatali Akhundov (1812–1878) and Mammad agha Shahtakhtinski (1846–1931) promoted the development of a Latin script for the Azerbaijani language. Akhundov argued that the use of the Arabic script in writing the Azerbaijani alphabet made literacy more difficult to obtain. Moreover, it made education the privilege of the elite.

Akhundov's proposals evolved over approximately 20 years. Initially, Akhundov proposed that when writing the Azerbaijani alphabet, the Arabic script be used though with dots removed and marks added for unwritten vowels. Later, Akhundov suggested letters be written separately, each with a distinct form. Finally, he recommended use of the Latin script to write the alphabet and that lines be read left to right.

Akhundov's proposal was called "The New Alphabet Project". In 1857, Akhundov presented his proposal to authorities in Iran and in 1863, to Fuad Pasha and Ali Pasha in Istanbul. The project was also discussed at the Cemiyyet-i İlmiyye-i Osmaniyye (the Ottoman Scientific Society). Although the disadvantages of using the Arabic script to write the Azerbaijani alphabet were acknowledged, the project was not supported by officials. Difficulties in creating printed text and political reasons were cited.

==== Soviet Union reforms ====
In 1922, a Latin alphabet was created by the Yeni türk əlifba komitəsi (the new Turkic alphabet committee; Јени түрк әлифба комитәси) in Baku, the capital city of Azerbaijan. The committee was sponsored by the Soviet Union with the aim of differentiating Azerbaijanis in the Soviet union from those in Iran and encouraging the secularisation of Muslim culture in Azerbaijan. Alphabet reforms were previously by the Azerbaijani religious establishment on the grounds that the Arabic script, the language of the Qur’an, was "holy and should not be tampered with". However, in 1926, at the first Turkology congress in Baku, alphabet reform was strongly supported.

From 1922 to 1929, both Arabic and Latin scripts were used in Soviet texts printed in Azerbaijan. In 1929, the Latin script officially replaced the Arabic script. In 1933, the Azerbaijani Latin alphabet was reformed to match the alphabets of other Soviet Turkic languages according to the new Turkic alphabet and the uniform Turkic alphabet. The reform changed certain glyphs and phonetic values.

In 1939, Joseph Stalin ordered Azerbaijani be written in the Cyrillic script. This was again to differentiate Azebaijanis living the Soviet Union to those living in Turkey.

In December 1991, the Soviet Union was formally dissolved. With this, Azerbaijan gained independence. The Azerbaijani parliament adopted a new Latin script alphabet. Latin and Cyrillic scripts were both accepted in a transition period from 1991 to 2001. Since 2001, the official alphabet of Azerbaijan has been written in the Latin alphabet.

The Azerbaijani poet Samad Vurgun declared, "Azerbaijani people are proud of being the first among Oriental nations that buried the Arabic alphabet and adopted the Latin alphabet. This event is written in golden letters of our history".

==== Historical variations ====
- 1922–1933
  Aa, Bb, Cc, Çç, Dd, Ee, Əə, Ff, Gg, Ƣƣ, Hh, Ii,, Jj, Kk, Ll, Mm, Nn, Ꞑꞑ, Oo, Ɵɵ, Pp, Qq, Rr, Ss, Tt, Uu, Vv, Xx, Yy, Zz, Ƶƶ, Ɜɜ, ' (apostrophe)
- 1933–1939
  Aa, Bʙ, Cc, Çç, Dd, Ee, Əə, Ff, Gg, Ƣƣ, Hh, Ii, Ьь, Jj, Kk, Qq, Ll, Mm, Nn, Ꞑꞑ, Oo, Ɵɵ, Pp, Rr, Ss, Şş, Tt, Uu, Vv, Xx, Уy, Zz, Ƶƶ, ' (apostrophe)
- 1939–1958
  Аа, Бб, Вв, Гг, Ғғ, Дд, Ее, Әә, Жж, Зз, Ии, Йй, Кк, Ҝҝ, Лл, Мм, Нн, Оо, Өө, Пп, Рр, Сс, Тт, Уу, Үү, Фф, Хх, Һһ, Цц, Чч, Ҹҹ, Шш, Ыы, Ээ, Юю, Яя, ' (apostrophe)
- 1958–1991
  Аа, Бб, Вв, Гг, Ғғ, Дд, Ее, Әә, Жж, Зз, Ии, Ыы, Јј, Кк, Ҝҝ, Лл, Мм, Нн, Оо, Өө, Пп, Рр, Сс, Тт, Уу, Үү, Фф, Хх, Һһ, Чч, Ҹҹ, Шш, ' (apostrophe)
- 1991–1992
  Aa, Ää, Bb, Cc, Çç, Dd, Ee, Ff, Gg, Ğğ, Hh, Xx, Iı, İi, Jj, Kk, Qq, Ll, Mm, Nn, Oo, Öö, Pp, Rr, Ss, Şş, Tt, Uu, Üü, Vv, Yy, Zz
- 1992 onwards
  Aa, Bb, Cc, Çç, Dd, Ee, Əə, Ff, Gg, Ğğ, Hh, Xx, Iı, İi, Jj, Kk, Qq, Ll, Mm, Nn, Oo, Öö, Pp, Rr, Ss, Şş, Tt, Uu, Üü, Vv, Yy, Zz

Azerbaijani alphabets, 1922–present
1922–1933	Aa	Bʙ	Cc	Çç	Dd	Ee	Əə	Ff	Ƣƣ	Gg	Hh	Xx		Ii	Ƶƶ	Qq	Kk	Ll	Mm	Nn	Ꞑꞑ	Oo	Ɵɵ	Pp	Rr	Ss	Ɜɜ	Tt	Yy	Uu	Vv	Jj	Zz
1933–1939	Aa	Bʙ	Çç	Cc	Dd	Ee	Əə	Ff	Gg	Ƣƣ	Hh	Xx	Ьь	Ii	Ƶƶ	Kk	Qq	Ll	Mm	Nn	Ꞑꞑ	Oo	Ɵɵ	Pp	Rr	Ss	Şş	Tt	Uu	Уy	Vv	Jj	Zz
1939–1958	Аа	Бб	Ҹҹ	Чч	Дд	Ээ	Әә	Фф	Ҝҝ	Ғғ	Һһ	Хх	Ыы	Ии	Жж	Кк	Гг	Лл	Мм	Нн		Оо	Өө	Пп	Рр	Сс	Шш	Тт	Уу	Үү	Вв	Йй	Зз
1958–1991	Аа	Бб	Ҹҹ	Чч	Дд	Ее	Әә	Фф	Ҝҝ	Ғғ	Һһ	Хх	Ыы	Ии	Жж	Кк	Гг	Лл	Мм	Нн		Оо	Өө	Пп	Рр	Сс	Шш	Тт	Уу	Үү	Вв	Јј	Зз
1991–1992	Aa	Bb	Cc	Çç	Dd	Ee	Ää	Ff	Gg	Ğğ	Hh	Xx	Iı	İi	Jj	Kk	Qq	Ll	Mm	Nn		Oo	Öö	Pp	Rr	Ss	Şş	Tt	Uu	Üü	Vv	Yy	Zz
1992–present	Aa	Bb	Cc	Çç	Dd	Ee	Əə	Ff	Gg	Ğğ	Hh	Xx	Iı	İi	Jj	Kk	Qq	Ll	Mm	Nn		Oo	Öö	Pp	Rr	Ss	Şş	Tt	Uu	Üü	Vv	Yy	Zz
IPA	/ɑ/	/b/	/d͡ʒ/	/t͡ʃ/	/d/	/e/	/æ/	/f/	/ɟ/	/ɣ/	/h/	/x/	/ɯ/	/i/	/ʒ/	/c/, /k/	/ɡ/	/l/	/m/	/n/	[ŋ]	/ɔ/	/œ/	/p/	/r/	/s/	/ʃ/	/t/	/u/	/y/	/v/	/j/	/z/

=== Contemporary alphabet ===
The Azerbaijani alphabet is the same as the Turkish alphabet, except for Әə, Xx, and Qq, which do not exist as separate phonemes in Turkish. There are several important differences between the modern Latin Azerbaijani alphabet and its predecessors.

- Ğğ has replaced the historic Ƣƣ.
- The dotless Iı has replaced the historic I with bowl Ьь.
- The lowercase form of the letter B has changed from a small capital ʙ to the usual b, while the uppercase form of the letter y has changed from a Cyrillic like У to the Latin Y.
- The dotted İi has replaced the historic soft-dotted Ii, with the addition of a tittle on its uppercase counterpart. Additionally, I has become the uppercase counterpart of ı, while i is the lowercase counterpart of İ.
- Jj has replaced Ƶƶ.
- Öö has replaced Ɵɵ.
- Üü has replaced Yy
- Yy has replaced Jј.
- Әə was replaced by Ää, which was placed between Aa and Bb, but was then changed back to Әə, placed between Ee and Ff in the alphabet. Consequently, Jj, Yy, and some other letters (Cc, Çç) have changed their phonetic values.

The sounds [k] and [ɡ] in loanwords were rendered q and ƣ respectively in the Latin alphabet of 1933. However, к and г in the Cyrillic are rendered k and q in the latest Latin alphabet: ƣrafiqa (1933 Latin) — графика (Cyrillic) — qrafika (current Latin).

In translingual contexts (mathematics, for example), the letters of the ISO basic Latin alphabet are named in Azerbaijani in the following way: a, be, ce (se), de, e, ef, qe, aş (haş), i, yot, ka, el, em, en, o, pe, ku, er, es, te, u, ve, dubl-ve, iks, iqrek, zet.

=== Schwa (Ə) ===
When the new Latin script was introduced on 25 December 1991, A-diaeresis (Ä ä) was selected to represent the sound /æ/. However, on 16 May 1992, it was replaced by the previously-used grapheme schwa (Ə ə).

Although Ä ä may seem a simpler alternative, due to the schwa being absent in most character sets, schwa was reintroduced for historical reasons. The schwa represented Azerbaijani's most common vowel in both of the post-Arabic alphabets (Latin and Cyrillic) of Azerbaijan.

However, the lack of standardisation of the placement of the inverted "e" key on Azerbaijani computer keyboards of the 1990s and its assignment in computer code caused difficulties in the use of the schwa.

== Arabic script ==
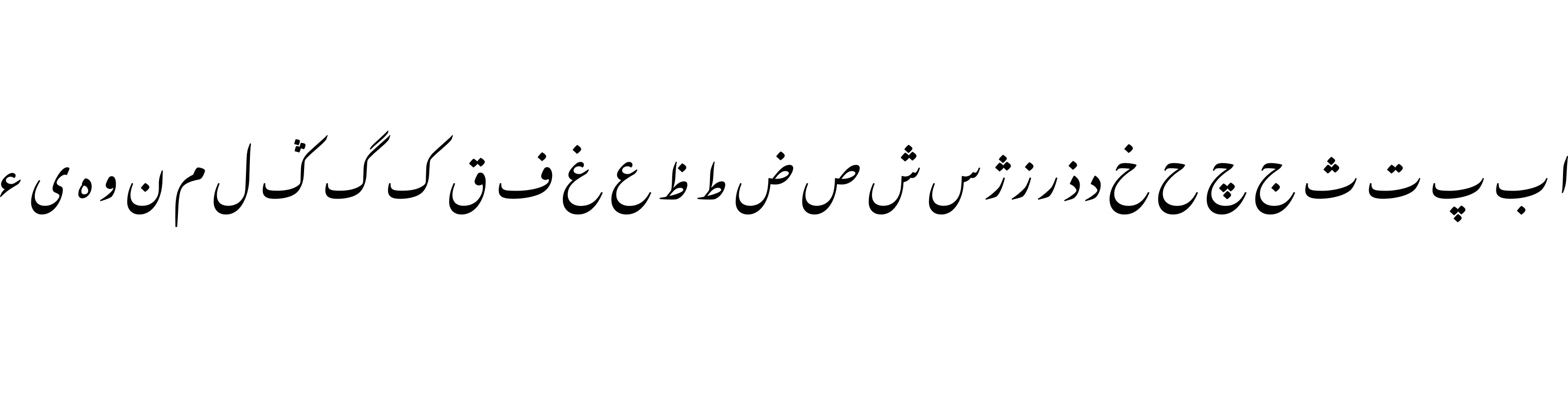
The Arabic script used in the Iranian Azerbaijan region, lacking ؽ and ۆ

In Iran, the Arabic script (or the closely related script of the Persian alphabet) has traditionally been used to write the Azerbaijani alphabet. In the late 20th century standardisation began. However, linguists associated with the standardization movement, including contributors to Varlıq (a quarterly literary magazine published in both Persian and Azerbaijano languages) argued that Azerbaijani written in an unmodified Persian script presented phonetic redundancies. For example, the Persian script contained multiple letters for the same consonant sound. The letters ت and ط both represent the "t" sound. Conversely, diacritics and dedicated characters for vowel sounds specific to Azerbaijani were lacking.

In 2001, linguistic seminars to resolve these difficulties were convened by Javad Heyat, founder of Varlıq, in Tehran. The resulting standardised Azerbaijani alphabet was integrated into the Azerbaijani dictionary (Lügatnâme-ye Torki-ye Âzarbâyjâni).

Although the use of tribal and regional languages is permitted in Iran, there is no state curriculum for the teaching of Azerbaijani. The use of the Latin script to write the Azerbaijani alphabet is increasing amongst young Azerbaijani speaking Iranians. This is attributed to the use of the Latin script in neighbouring Azerbaijan and the convenience of using the Latin script in the information technology environment.

=== Persian and Arabic scripts ===
==== Vowels ====
In the Arabic script Azerbaijani alphabet, nine vowels are defined. Six of those vowels are present in Persian script and three are absent. This is an important difference. For example, vowels in the initial position in the Persian script require an alef (ا) and may also require a following vav (و) or ye (ی). Thus, Arabic loanwords starting with ʿayn (ع) may be unable to write using the Persian script Azerbaijani alphabet. Arabic diacritics including hamza are used in combination with the letters alhree areef (ا), vav (و) or ye (ی) to denote the vowels.

Below are the six vowels present in the Persian, Arabic and Latin script Azerbaijani alphabets.

- Ə-ə (اَ / ـَ / ـه‌ / ه); /æ/; A front vowel; only marked with fatha (ـَ) diacritic, or with a he at middle or final positions in the word. Examples include: əl اَل 'hand', ət اَت 'meat', əzmək اَزمَک 'to crush'.
- E-e (ائ / ئ); /ɛ/; A front vowel; marked with a hamza on top a ye (ئ). Examples include: el ائل 'people', en ائن 'wide'.
- O-o (اوْ / وْ); /o/; A rounded back vowel; shown with vav (و), either unmarked, or marked with sukun (zero-vowel) (ـْ). Examples include: od اوْد 'fire', ot اوْت 'grass', on اوْن 'ten'.
- A-a (آ / ‍ـا); /ɑ/; A back vowel; shown with alef (ا) in middle and final positions, and alef-maddeh (آ) in initial position. Examples include: ad آد 'name', at آت 'horse'.
- İ-i (ای / ی) /i/; A front vowel; shown with a ye (ی) and no diacritic. Examples include: il ایل 'year', ip ایپ 'rope'.
- U-u (اۇ / ۇ) /u/; A back vowel; shown with a vav and a Ḍammah (ـُ). Examples include: uzun اۇزۇن 'long', ucuz اۇجۇز 'cheap'.

The following three vowels are absent in the Persian script Azrbaijani alphabet.

- Ö-ö (اؤ / ؤ) /œ/; A front vowel; shown with a hamza on top a vav (ؤ). Examples include: öyüd اؤیوٚد 'advice', göz گؤز 'eye'.
- Ü-ü (اوٚ / وٚ) /y/; A front vowel; shown with a "v" diacritic on top a vav (وٚ). Examples include üst اوٚست 'up', üzüm اوٚزوٚم 'grapes', güzgü گوٚزگوٚ 'mirror'.
- I-ı (ایٛ / یٛ) /ɯ/; rarely used and usually substituted by ى; A back vowel; shown with an inverted "v" diacritic on top of a ye (یٛ). Examples include: qızıl قیٛزیٛل 'gold', açıq آچیٛق 'open, turned on', sırğa سیٛرغا 'earring', sarı ساریٛ 'yellow'.

		Front اینجه صائیتلر incə saitlər		Back قالین صائیتلر qalın saitlər	
		Unrounded	Rounded	Unrounded	Rounded
Close	Arabic	ای / ی	اوٚ / وٚ	ایٛ / یٛ	اوُ / وُ
Close	Latin	İ i	Ü ü	I ı	U u
Close	IPA	[i]	[y]	[ɯ]	[u]
Mid	Arabic	ائ / ئ	اؤ / ؤ		اوْ / وْ
Mid	Latin	E e	Ö ö		O o
Mid	IPA	[ɛ]	[œ]		[o]
Open	Arabic	اَ / ـَ / ـه‌ / ه		آ / ‍ـا	
Open	Latin	Ə ə		A a	
Open	IPA	[æ]		[ɑ]	

==== Vowel harmony ====
Azerbaijani has, as do other Turkic languages, systems of vowel harmony. Azerbaijani's system of vowel harmony involves rules of uniformity between vowels pronounced at the front or the back of the mouth within words. That is, all the vowels in a word must be either pronounced at the front or the back of the mouth. In Azerbaijani, there are two suffixes that make a plural word. It is either -ـلَر -lər, a front vowel, or -ـلار -lar, a back vowel.

For instance, in the Azerbaijani word for "dog", all the vowels are pronounced at the front of the mouth.

- The word for 'dog' is ایت it. The word for 'dogs' is ایتلَر itlər. (ایتلار itlar is incorrect.)

Similarly, in the Azerbaijani word for "mountain", all the vowels are pronounced at the back of the mouth.

- The word for 'mountain' is داغ dağ, thus the word for 'mountains' is داغلار dağlar.

In another case of vowel harmony, vowels are pronounced either rounded or unrounded. A rounded vowel is pronounced with the lips rounded. This applies to some but not all of the suffixes.

For example, there are four variations for the common suffix لی- -lı/-li and -لو -lu/-lü.

- The word for 'salt' is دوُز duz. The word for 'salty' will be دوُزلو duzlu.
- The city of Tabriz is تبریز Təbriz. The word for someone from Tabriz is تبریزلی Təbrizli.

==== Conventions on the writing of vowels ====
In the Arabic script Azerbaijani alphabet, there are conventions with regards to the writing of diacritics. In some situations, depending on the educational status and position of the writer, diacritics are sometimes omitted.

For A-a (آ / ‍ـا), the vowel is always written and shown with an alef.

For Ə-ə (اَ / ـَ / ـه‌ / ه), the initial vowel is written with an alef. Vowels in the middle of the word are written either with a diacritic or with a final he (ـه‌ / ه). The former is used in closed syllables or in the first open syllable of the word. The latter is used in open syllables with the exception of the first syllable of the word.

The vowel he (ـه‌ / ه) is not attached to the following letter, but is separated from it with a Zero-width non-joiner. For example, the word gələcəyim (gə-lə-cəy-im) 'my future' is written as گله‌جگیم.

The E-e (ائ / ئ) sound is shown with a hamzeh on top of a ye in mosy cases. The exceptions are loanwords of Persian, Arabic, or European origin. For example, enerji 'energy' is written as انرژی.

If ⟨E⟩ and ⟨Y⟩ occur side by side, both letters are written. For example, قئید qeyd, شئیدا şeyda, ویئتنام Vyetnam, غئیرت ğeyrət.

Loanwords from Persian or Arabic which contain the sound [i] but are adopted in Azerbaijani with the sound [e] are shown with ⟨ئ⟩. Examples include تسبئح təsbeh, بئساواد besavad, پئشکش peşkəş.

İ-i (ای / ی), (ی) and I-ı (ایٛ / یٛ), are shown with ye (ی).

=== Consonants ===
The Arabic script Azerbaijani alphabet has thirty consonants. Some sounds are represented by more than one consonant. Some letters in Arabic script are only used for loanwords.

No.	Letter	Latin equivalent	IPA	Example	Latin spelling	Meaning
1	ب	B b	[b]	بالؽق بئل قاب	Balıq; Bel; Qab	fish dorsum plate
2	پ	P p	[p/pʰ]	ایپک ساپ	İpək; Sap	silk string
3	ت	T t	[t/tʰ]	تلیس	Təlis	sack
4	ث	S s	[s]	ثۆریّا	Sürəyya	Surayya (name)
5	ج	C c	[d͡ʑ]	جئیران قوْجا کرپیج	Ceyran; Qoca; Kərpic	‌ Gazelle old person brick
6	چ	Ç ç	[t͡ɕ/t͡ɕʰ]	چای سئرچه قوْلچاق	Çay; Serçə; Qolçaq	river sparrow puppet
7	ح^{1}	H h	[h/hˁ]	حۆریّت صاباح	Hürriyyət; Sabah	freedom morning, tomorrow
8	خ	X x	[x/χ]	خوْرتان آرخ توْخۇماق	Xortan; Arx; Toxumaq	boogeyman water stream to knit
9	د	D d	[d̪]	داراق دامجؽ	Daraq; Damcı	shoulder droplet
10	ذ	Z z	[z]	اذیّت گۆذشت	‌ əziyyət güzəşt	bothering forgiveness
11	ر	R r	[ɾ/r]	بَرک قارا	Bərk; Qara	hard black
12	ز	Z z	[z]	زای مازالاق بالدؽز	Zay; Mazalaq; Baldız	rotten spinning top (toy) sister-in-law
13	ژ	J j	[ʒ]	قؽژقؽرماق ژاله	Qıjqırmaq; Jalə	to go sour Zhaleh (name)
14	س^{2}	S s	[s]	ساچ ترسَه	Saç; Tərsə	hair bun in reverse
15	ش	Ş ş	[ʃ/ʂ/ɕ]	شیش مئشه دؤش	Şiş; Meşə; Döş	skewer forest chest
16	ص	S s	[s]	صاباح صۆلح ایصفاهان	Sabah; Sülh; İsfahan	morning, tomorrow peace Isfahan
17	ض	Z z	[t/tʰ]	ضربه	Zərbə	hit
18	ط	T t	[t̪]	طاماح	Tamah	greed
19	ظ	Z z	[z]	ظالؽم	Zalım	tyrant
20	غ^{3}	Ğ ğ	[ɣ/ʁ (ʕ/ʢ)]	آغرؽ یاغ	Ağrı; Yağ	pain oil
21	ف	F f	[f]	کۆفلنمیش	Küflənmiş	moldy
22	ق^{4}	Q q	[g/ɢ]	قارقا قۇلاق قارپؽز	Qarqa; Qulaq; Qarpız	crow ear watermelon
23	ک^{5}	K k	[c/cʰ/k (ç)]	کۆرک تیکان اؤرتۆک	Kürək; Tikan; Örtük	shoulder blade thorn bedsheet
24	گ^{6}	G g	[ɟ]	گؤزل گَلین سۆپۆرگه	Gözəl; Gəlin; Süpürgə	beautiful bride broom
25	ل	L l	[l/ɫ]	لاله سالخؽم اَل	Lalə; Salxım; Əl	tulip fruit bunch (e.g. grape) hand
26	م	M m	[m]	مارال اَپریمک	Maral; Əprimək	deer to rut or rust
27	ن	N n	[n]	نارین	Narin	tiny
28	و^{7}	V v	[v]	وئرمک سئوگی	Vermək sevgi	to give love
29	ه / هـ^{1,7}	H h	[h/hˁ]	هؤرمک	Hörmək	to braid
30	ی^{7}	Y y	[j]	آیؽ آی	Ayı; Ay	bear moon

Notes

1. Arabic loanwords that end in ʿayn (ع), such as "طمع" (təmə') (greed), or "متاع" (məta') (baggage), are pronounced in Azerbaijani with a final [h]. Thus they written with a "ح" (he). For example, "طاماح" (tamah), "ماتاح" (matah). If the change in pronunciation of ʿayn (ع) happens mid-word, it would be written as "ه / هـ". For example, "فعله" (fə'lə) (worker) is written as "فهله" (fəhlə).
2. Loanwords that start with consonant sequences SK, ST, SP, ŞT, and ŞP are started with an "ای" (i). For example, ایستئیک (isteyk) (Steak) and ایسپورت (isport) (sports).
3. Loanwords with "غ" or "ق" may be pronounced differently in Azerbaijani but the original spelling is kept. For example, "افغان" (Əfqan) (Afghan).
4. Loanwords with "گ" (G g) re written with a "ق". For example, "قاز" (Qaz) (gas); "اوْرتوقرافی" (Orfoqrafi) (orthography).
5. When the letter "ک" (K k) appears between two vowels, the letter "گ" (G g) is substituted in the Arabic Azerbaijani script to maintain the shape of the word. For example, "چؤرک+یم" becomes "چؤرگیم" (my bread).
6. Whenever the letter "ی" (Y) is placed between two "ای" (İ-i) vowels, it is written as "گ" (G g). For example, "ایگیرمی" (iyirmi) (twenty).
7. The letters "و" ,"ه / هـ", and "ی" have a double function, as consonant, and as part of vowels. When used as consonant, they are written with no diacritic or marking.
8. Shadda, the Arabic diacritic for gemination, is retained. For example, "مۆکمّل" (mükəmməl) (complementary) and "مدنیّت" (mədəniyyət) (civility). In native Azerbaijani words and in loanwords of European origin, double consonants are written twice. For example, "یئددی" (yeddi) (seven), "ساققال" (saqqal) (beard) and "اوْتللو" (Otello).

== Cyrillic alphabet ==
The Azerbaijani Cyrillic alphabet consists of 32 letters.

Azerbaijani Cyrillic alphabet
Uppercase
А	Б	В	Г	Ғ	Д	Е	Ә	Ж	З	И	Ы	Ј	К	Ҝ	Л
М	Н	О	Ө	П	Р	С	Т	У	Ү	Ф	Х	Һ	Ч	Ҹ	Ш
Lowercase
а	б	в	г	ғ	д	е	ә	ж	з	и	ы	ј	к	ҝ	л
м	н	о	ө	п	р	с	т	у	ү	ф	х	һ	ч	ҹ	ш
Names
а	бе	ве	ге	ғе	де	е	ә	же	зе	и	ы	је	ке	ҝе	ел
ем	ен	о	ө	пе	ер	се	те	у	ү	фе	хе	һе	че	ҹе	ше

== Sample texts ==
=== National anthem ===
This section contains the national anthem of Azerbaijan, in the contemporary Latin, Arabic and Cyrillic script alphabets with an English translation.

Azerbaijani in Latin script (since 1992)	Azerbaijani in Arabic script (modern convention)	English translation
Azərbaycan! Azərbaycan! Ey qəhrəman övladın şanlı Vətəni! Səndən ötrü can verməyə cümlə hazırız! Səndən ötrü qan tökməyə cümlə qadiriz! Üçrəngli bayrağınla məsud yaşa! Üçrəngli bayrağınla məsud yaşa! Minlərlə can qurban oldu, Sinən hərbə meydan oldu! Hüququndan keçən əsgər, Hərə bir qəhrəman oldu! Sən olasan gülüstan, Sənə hər an can qurban! Sənə min bir məhəbbət Sinəmdə tutmuş məkan! Namusunu hifz etməyə, Bayrağını yüksəltməyə Namusunu hifz etməyə, Cümlə gənclər müştaqdır! Şanlı Vətən! Şanlı Vətən! Azərbaycan! Azərbaycan! Azərbaycan! Azərbaycan!	آذربایجان! آذربایجان! ای قهرمان اؤولادؽن شانلؽ وطنی! سندن اؤترۆ جان وئرمه‌یه ج‍ۆمله حاضؽرؽز! سندن اؤترۆ قان تؤکمه‌یه ج‍ۆمله قادیریز! اۆچ رنگلی بایراغؽنلا مسعود یاشا! اۆچ رنگلی بایراغؽنلا مسعود یاشا! مینلرله جان قۇربان اوْلدۇ، سینه‌ن حربه مئیدان اوْلدۇ! حۆقۇقۇندان کئچن عسگر، هره بیر قهرمان اوْلدۇ! سن اوْلاسان گۆلۆستان، سنه هر آن جان قۇربان! سنه مین بیر محبّت سینه‌مده تۇتمۇش مکان! نامۇسۇنۇ حیفظ ائتمه‌یه، بایراغؽنؽ یۆکسلتمه‌یه نامۇسۇنۇ حیفظ ائتمه‌یه، ج‍ۆمله گنجلر مۆشتاقدؽر! شانلؽ وطن! شانلؽ وطن! آذربایجان! آذربایجان! آذربایجان! آذربایجان!	Azerbaijan! Azerbaijan! O triumphant homeland of children of heroes! We are all ready to bestow our lives on you! We are fain to shed our very own blood for you! May you live in bliss with your three-coloured flag! May you live in bliss with your three-coloured flag! Thousands of lives were sacrificed, Your soul a battlefield became, Of every soldier devoted, Each one of them heroes became! Blossom like a rose garden, My life ever sworn to you, A thousand one loves for you, In my heart rooted deeply! To stand on guard for your honour, Bearing aloft your sacred flag; To stand on guard for your honour, Eager be every youthful heir! Glorious homeland! Glorious homeland! Azerbaijan! Azerbaijan! Azerbaijan! Azerbaijan!
Azerbaijani in Latin script (1991–1992)	Azerbaijani in Cyrillic script (1958–1991; still used in Dagestan)	Azerbaijani in Cyrillic script (1939–1958)
Azärbaycan! Azärbaycan! Ey qähräman övladın şanlı Vätäni! Sändän ötrü can vermäyä cümlä hazırız! Sändän ötrü qan tökmäyä cümlä qadiriz! Üçrängli bayrağınla mäsud yaşa! Üçrängli bayrağınla mäsud yaşa! Minlärlä can qurban oldu, Sinän härbä meydan oldu! Hüququndan keçän äsgär, Härä bir qähräman oldu! Sän olasan gülüstan, Sänä här an can qurban! Sänä min bir mähäbbät Sinämdä tutmuş mäkan! Namusunu hifz etmäyä, Bayrağını yüksältmäyä Namusunu hifz etmäyä, Cümlä gänclär müştaqdır! Şanlı Vätän! Şanlı Vätän! Azärbaycan! Azärbaycan! Azärbaycan! Azärbaycan!	Азәрбајҹан! Азәрбајҹан! Еј гәһрәман өвладын шанлы Вәтәни! Сәндән өтрү ҹан вермәјә ҹүмлә һазырыз! Сәндән өтрү ган төкмәјә ҹүмлә гадириз! Үчрәнҝли бајрағынла мәсуд јаша! Үчрәнҝли бајрағынла мәсуд јаша! Минләрлә ҹан гурбан олду, Синән һәрбә мејдан олду! Һүгугундан кечән әсҝәр, Һәрә бир гәһрәман олду! Сән оласан ҝүлүстан, Сәнә һәр ан ҹан гурбан! Сәнә мин бир мәһәббәт Синәмдә тутмуш мәкан! Намусуну һифз етмәјә, Бајрағыны јүксәлтмәјә Намусуну һифз етмәјә, Ҹүмлә ҝәнҹләр мүштагдыр! Шанлы Вәтән! Шанлы Вәтән! Азәрбајҹан! Азәрбајҹан! Азәрбајҹан! Азәрбајҹан!	Азәрбайҹан! Азәрбайҹан! Эй гәһрәман өвладын шанлы Вәтәни! Сәндән өтрү ҹан вермәйә ҹүмлә һазырыз! Сәндән өтрү ган төкмәйә ҹүмлә гадириз! Үчрәнҝли байрағынла мәсуд яша! Үчрәнҝли байрағынла мәсуд яша! Минләрлә ҹан гурбан олду, Синән һәрбә мейдан олду! Һүгугундан кечән әсҝәр, Һәрә бир гәһрәман олду! Сән оласан ҝүлүстан, Сәнә һәр ан ҹан гурбан! Сәнә мин бир мәһәббәт Синәмдә тутмуш мәкан! Намусуну һифз этмәйә, Байрағыны йүксәлтмәйә Намусуну һифз этмәйә, Ҹүмлә ҝәнҹләр мүштагдыр! Шанлы Вәтән! Шанлы Вәтән! Азәрбайҹан! Азәрбайҹан! Азәрбайҹан! Азәрбайҹан!
Azerbaijani in Latin script (1933–1939)	Azerbaijani in Latin script (1929–1933)	Azerbaijani in Arabic script (until 1929)
Azərʙajçan! Azərʙajçan! Ej qəhrəman ɵvladьn şanlь Vətəni! Səndən ɵtry çan verməjə çymlə hazьrьz! Səndən ɵtry qan tɵkməjə çymlə qadiriz! Уcrəngli ʙajraƣьnla məsud jaşa! Уcrəngli ʙajraƣьnla məsud jaşa! Minlərlə çan qurʙan oldu, Sinən hərʙə mejdan oldu! Hyququndan kecən əsgər, Hərə ʙir qəhrəman oldu! Sən olasan gylystan, Sənə hər an çan qurʙan! Sənə min ʙir məhəʙʙət Sinəmdə tutmuş məkan! Namusunu hifz etməjə, Bajraƣьnь jyksəltməjə Namusunu hifz etməjə, Çymlə gənçlər myştaqdьr! Şanlь Vətən! Şanlь Vətən! Azərʙajçan! Azərʙajçan! Azərʙajçan! Azərʙajçan!	Azərbajcan! Azərbajcan! Ej kəhrəman ɵvladn ɜanl Vətəni! Səndən ɵtru can verməjə cumlə hazrz! Səndən ɵtru kan tɵkməjə cumlə kadiriz! Uçrənƣli bajragnla məsyd jaɜa! Uçrənƣli bajragnla məsyd jaɜa! Minlərlə can kyrban oldy, Sinən hərbə mejdan oldy! Hukykyndan keçən əsƣər, Hərə bir kəhrəman oldy! Sən olasan ƣulustan, Sənə hər an can kyrban! Sənə min bir məhəbbət Sinəmdə tytmyɜ məkan! Namysyny hifz etməjə, Bajragn juksəltməjə Namysyny hifz etməjə, Cumlə ƣənclər muɜtakdr! Ɜanl Vətən! ɜanl Vətən! Azərbajcan! Azərbajcan! Azərbajcan! Azərbajcan!	آذربایجان! آذربایجان! ای قهرمان اولادین شانلی وطنی سندن اوترو جان ورمه‌یه جومله حاضریز سندن اوتروقان توکمه‌یه جومله قادیریز اوچ رنگلی بایراقین‌لا مسعود یاشا! اوچ رنگلی بایراقین‌لا مسعود یاشا! مینلرله جان قوربان اولدو سینن حربه میدان اولدو! حقوقوندان کچن عسکر هره بیر قهرمان اولدو! سن اولاسان گولوستان! سنه هرآن جان قوربان! سنه مین بیر محبت سینه‌مده توتموش مکان! ناموسونو حیفظ اتمه‌یه بایراقینی یوکسلتمه‌یه ناموسونو حیفظ اتمه‌یه جومله گنجلر موشتاقدیر شانلی وطن! شانلی وطن! آذربایجان! آذربایجان! آذربایجان! آذربایجان!

== Correspondence table ==
The Arabic, Latin, and Cyrillic alphabets each have a different sequence of letters. The table below is ordered according to the contemporary Latin alphabet:

Azerbaijani alphabet transliteration table
Arabic	Latin		Cyrillic		Latin		IPA
	1922–1933	1933–1939	1939–1958	1958–1991	1991–1992	1992–Present	IPA
آ-ا	A a						[ɑ]
ب	B b	B ʙ	Б б		B b		[b]
ج	C c	Ç ç	Ҹ ҹ		C c		[dʒ]
چ	Ç ç	C c	Ч ч		Ç ç		[tʃ]
د	D d		Д д		D d		[d]
ائ	E e		Е е, Э э (Note: in the beginning of a word and after vowels)	Е е			[e]
ه-ٱ-اَ-هٔ	Ə ə				Ä ä	Ə ə	[æ]
ف	F f		Ф ф		F f		[f]
گ	Ƣ ƣ	G g	Ҝ ҝ		G g		[ɟ]
غ	G g	Ƣ ƣ	Ғ ғ		Ğ ğ		[ɣ]
ح, ه	H h		Һ һ		H h		[h]
خ	X x						[x]
اؽ	Į į	Ь ь	Ы ы		I ı		[ɯ]
ای	I i		И и		İ i		[ɪ]
ژ	Ƶ ƶ		Ж ж		J j		[ʒ]
ک	Q q	K k	К к		K k		[c], [ç], [k]
ق	K k	Q q	Г г		Q q		[ɡ]
ل	L l		Л л		L l		[l]
م	M m		М м		M m		[m]
ن	N n		Н н		N n		[n]
وْ	O o						[o]
ؤ	Ɵ ɵ				Ö ö		[œ]
پ	P p		П п		P p		[p]
ر	R r		Р р		R r		[r]
ث, س, ص	S s		С с		S s		[s]
ش	Ɜ ɜ	Ş ş	Ш ш		Ş ş		[ʃ]
ت, ط	T t		Т т		T t		[t]
ۇ	Y y	U u	У у		U u		[u]
ۆ	U u	У y	Ү ү		Ü ü		[y]
و	V v		В в		V v		[v]
ی	J j		Й й	Ј ј	Y y		[j]
یا	ЈА ја		Я я	ЈА jа	YA ya		[jɑ]
یئ	ЈE јe		Е е	ЈЕ је	YE ye		[je]
ئ	E e						[e]
یوْ	ЈO јo		Йо йо	ЈО јо	YO yo		[jo]
یۇ	JY jy	ЈU јu	Ю ю	ЈУ ју	YU yu		[ju]
ذ, ز, ض, ظ	Z z		З з		Z z		[z]

The Azerbaijani Arabic alphabet once contained the letter ڴ ([ŋ] and )[n].These sounds were removed from the Latin script alphabet in 1938.

The Cyrillic letter Цц ([ts]) found in loanwords, was removed in 1951. In Azerbaijani, like in most Turkic languages, the sound [ts] generally becomes [s].

The apostrophe (glottal stop) in Persian script loan words was removed in 2004. It is still used to write foreign proper names.
