= Ğ =

Latin letter G with breve

G with breve
- Ğ ğ
- ǧ, ĝ, ḡ, ġ, ǥ, ǵ, g̃, ģ, ɠ

Usage
- Writing system: Latin script
- Type: Alphabetic
- Language of origin: Azerbaijani language, Crimean Tatar language, Turkish language
- Sound values: [.] [◌ː] [ɣ] [ʁ] [ɰ] [j] [d͡ʒ]
- In Unicode: U+011E, U+011F

History
Development
T14
        - Γ γ
          - 𐌂
            - C
              - G
                - Ğ ğ
- Time period: 1928 to present
- Descendants: • Ǧ • Ġ
- Sisters: G Г Ґ Ғ Ҕ Ӻ چ ج ገ ࠂ ג Ð
- Transliterations: غ, Gh (digraph), Ғ
- Variations: ǧ, ĝ, ḡ, ġ, ǥ, ǵ, g̃, ģ, ɠ

Other
- Associated graphs: gh, ǧ, ĝ, ḡ, ġ, ǥ, ǵ, g̃, ģ, ɠ
- Writing direction: Left-to-Right

Ğ (g with breve; minuscule: ğ) is a Latin letter found in the Turkish and Azerbaijani alphabets as well as the Latin alphabets of Zazaki, Laz, Crimean Tatar, Tatar, Kazakh. It will also be used in Uzbek when the law of October 2026 modifying the Uzbek Latin alphabet comes into force in April 2027. It traditionally represented the voiced velar fricative /ɣ/ or the voiced uvular fricative /ʁ/. In Turkish, in most cases it is reduced to a silent letter, serving as a vowel-lengthener. In Crimean Tatar in Romania it represents the voiced palato-alveolar affricate /d͡ʒ/.

== Turkish use ==
=== Current use ===
In Turkish, the ⟨ğ⟩ is known as yumuşak ge (pronounced [jumuˈʃak ˈɟe]; 'soft g') and is the ninth letter of the Turkish alphabet. It always follows a vowel, and can be compared to the blødt g ('soft g') in Danish.

Similarly to Azerbaijani, Crimean Tatar and other Turkic languages, Turkish used to have a /ɣ/ phoneme which could occur in all positions. However, the phoneme was gradually lost as it fortified to a /g/ if not preceded by a vowel and eroded away elsewhere. The fortified form is now written with a ⟨g⟩, while the eroded form is shown with a ⟨ğ⟩; showing that in native Turkish words which have vowels in contact with each other, there used to be a consonant separating them (in fact Turkish language resources will still insist native words do not have consecutive vowels). In loanwords, consecutive vowels are not separated with a ğ, but in speech they may be separated by a glottal stop. For example, the Arabic loanword cemaat or cemaât may be pronounced as either [dʒeˈma.atʲ] or [dʒeˈmaʔatʲ].

The realization of the phoneme depends on its location in a word and the surrounding vowels:

| spelling | pronunciation | spelling | pronunciation |
|---|---|---|---|
| ağ | [aː] | eğ | [ej] |
| iğ | [iː] | ığ | [ɯː] |
| oğ | [oː] | uğ | [uː] |
| öğ | [œː] | üğ | [yː] |
| ağa | [a.a] | ığı | [ɯ.ɯ] |
| uğu | [u.u] | | |
| eğe | [e(j)e] | iği | [i.i] |
| üğü | [y(j)y] | | |
| ağu | [a(w)u] | oğa | [o(w)a] |
| oğu | [o(w)u] | uğa | [u(w)a] |
| öğe | [œ.e] | öğü | [œ.y] |
| üğe | [y.e] | | |
| ağı | [a.ɯ~aː~a]* | ığa | [ɯ.a] |
| eği | [eji~iː~e.i~æ]* | iğe | [i.e~ije] |

- in word-final and syllable-final positions it lengthens the preceding vowel, for example: dağ(lar) [daː(laɾ)] ('mountain[s]'), sığ [sɯː] ('shallow'); when following a front vowel (e, i), it may sound /j/ instead: değnek [dejnek] ('cane'), it may be different in some dialects compared to each other([deːnek] or [dejnek] );
- between identical back vowels (a, ı, u) it is silent: sığınak [sɯːnak] ('shelter'), uğur [uːɾ] ('good luck');
- between identical front vowels (e, i, ü) it is either silent: sevdiğim [sevdiːm] ('that I love'), or pronounced [j]: düğün [dyjyn] ('wedding');
- between different rounded vowels (o, u, ö, ü), or between rounded (o, u, ö, ü) and unrounded (a, e) vowels it is mostly silent, but may be a bilabial glide: soğuk [so(w)uk] ('cold'), soğan [so(w)an] ('onion');
- ağı may sound as two vowels or as long a: ağır [a.ɯɾ, aːɾ] ('heavy');
- ığa is always two vowels: sığan [sɯ.an] ('which fits');
- in eği and iğe it is either silent or pronounced [j] as if written y: değil [dejil] ('not'), diğer [dijeɾ] ('other'); in colloquial speech eği is long i: değil [diːl];
- eği and ağı in the future suffix -(y)AcAK- are formally [e.i]/[a.ɯ] or colloquially [æ]/[a]: seveceğim [seveˈdʒe.im, seviˈdʒæm] ('I will love'); yazacağım [jazaˈdʒa.ɯm, jazɯˈdʒam] ('I will write').

Some webpages may use ⟨Ð⟩ (uppercase) and ⟨ð⟩ (lowercase) for ⟨Ğ⟩ because of improper encoding; see Turkish characters for the reasons of this.

=== Historical use ===
The letter, and its counterpart in the Ottoman Turkish alphabet, ⟨غ⟩, were once pronounced as a consonant, /ɣ/, the voiced velar fricative, until very recently in the history of Turkish, but it has undergone a sound change by which the consonant was completely lost and compensatory lengthening of the preceding vowel occurred, hence its function today. The sound change has not completely eliminated the sound in some Turkish dialects. The previous consonantal nature of the sound is evinced by earlier English loanwords from Turkish, such as yoghurt/yogurt (modern Turkish yoğurt) and agha (modern Turkish ağa), and the corresponding velar fricative found in cognate words in the closely related Azerbaijani language and the Turkish-influenced Crimean Tatar language. In Old Turkic (as well as earlier during Proto-Turkic times), this voiced velar fricative originated as an allophone of /ɡ/, the voiced velar stop, when it occurred intervocalically. The expected process of lenition (weakening and eventual loss of the intervocalic Proto-Turkic consonant *ɡ) is thus complete in Turkish and underway in many other Common Turkic languages.

== Azerbaijani use ==
In Azerbaijani ⟨ğ⟩ represents /ɣ/, the voiced velar fricative. In Azerbaijani, ğ never occurs at the beginning of a word.

== Crimean Tatar use ==
In Crimean Tatar, ⟨ğ⟩ represents /ɣ/ the voiced velar fricative.

== Dobruja Tatar use ==
For Crimean Tatar spelling used in Romania, also known as Dobrujan Tatar it represents the voiced palato-alveolar affricate /dʒ/.

== Tatar use ==
The Turkic Tatar language is written mostly in Cyrillic, but a Latin-based alphabet is also in use. In the Latin alphabet, ğ represents /ʁ/, the voiced uvular fricative. In Cyrillic, Tatar uses г for both g and ğ without distinction.

Tatar ğ / г is the Arabic ghayn غ. In Arabic words and names where there’s an ayin ع, Tatar adds the ghayn instead (عبد الله, ʻAbd Allāh, ’Abdullah; Tatar: Ğabdulla, Габдулла; Yaña imlâ: غابدوللا /ʁabdulla/).

In the Mishar Tatar Dialect, ğ is not pronounced, and thus, a word like şiğır (شعر, шигыр, "poem") is şigır or şiyır for Mishars (who in Finland use the Latin alphabet).

== Kazakh use ==
The current Kazakh Latin alphabet proposal, last updated in March 2021 and commissioned by President Kassym-Jomart Tokayev, uses ğ to replace the Kazakh Cyrillic Ғ to represent the IPA /ʁ/. The earlier 2020 proposal listed Ǵ instead, but was replaced after public criticism and the fact that it is a much-lesser used character.

== Friulian use ==
The Faggin–Nazzi alphabet for Friulian language uses the caron, owing to its Slavic influence. However, ⟨Ǧ⟩/⟨ǧ⟩ is often substituted with ⟨Ğ⟩/⟨ğ⟩ due to the former's lack of availability in fonts and input systems. This is because ⟨Ğ⟩/⟨ğ⟩ is in Latin Extended-A alongside ⟨Č⟩/⟨č⟩ and ⟨Š⟩/⟨š⟩, the other caron bearing letters in the alphabet, whereas ⟨Ǧ⟩/⟨ǧ⟩ is in Latin Extended-B, which is available in fewer fonts and input systems. Ǧǧ/Ğğ represents the phoneme /dʒ/.

== Character encoding ==
Character information
| Preview | Ğ | | ğ | |
|---|---|---|---|---|
| Unicode name | LATIN CAPITAL LETTER G WITH BREVE | | LATIN SMALL LETTER G WITH BREVE | |
| Encodings | decimal | hex | dec | hex |
| Unicode | 286 | U+011E | 287 | U+011F |
| UTF-8 | 196 158 | C4 9E | 196 159 | C4 9F |
| Numeric character reference | &#286; | &#x11E; | &#287; | &#x11F; |
| Named character reference | &Gbreve; | | &gbreve; | |
| ISO 8859-3 | 171 | AB | 187 | BB |
| ISO 8859-9 | 208 | D0 | 240 | F0 |

== See also ==
- Ǧ (g with caron)
- Ġayn (Arabic)
- Ghayn (Cyrillic)
- Hard sign
- Soft sign
