= Ghani (letter) =

26th letter of the three Georgian scripts

- Ⴖ ⴖ ღ ღ

Usage
- Writing system: Georgian script
- Type: Alphabetic
- Language of origin: Georgian language
- Sound values: [ɣ], [ʁ]
- In Unicode: U+10B6, U+2D16, U+10E6, U+1CA6
- Alphabetical position: 26

History
- Time period: c. 430 to present
- Transliterations: Gh, Ḡ, Ǧ, Ġ, Ɣ

Other
- Associated numbers: 700
- Writing direction: Left-to-right

Ghani, or Ghan (Asomtavruli: Ⴖ, Nuskhuri: ⴖ, Mkhedruli: ღ, Mtavruli: Ღ; Georgian: ღანი, ღან) is the 26th letter of the three Georgian scripts.

In the system of Georgian numerals, it has a value of 700. In the Georgian language, Ghani’s phonemic realisation can be classified as a voiced velar fricative /ɣ/, although it is argued that it can also be a voiced uvular fricative /ʁ/, depending on the context it appears in. It is typically romanized with the digraph Gh or with the letters Ḡ, Ǧ, Ġ, and Ɣ.

The mkhedruli form has become popular as an emoticon in the Western world due to its resemblance to a heart symbol and as part of a "love" emoticon, is often rendered as: ღ <3, and sometimes ღ(✿◠ᴗ◠)ღ

== Letter ==
asomtavruli	nuskhuri	mkhedruli	mtavruli

=== Three-dimensional ===
asomtavruli

nuskhuri

mkhedruli

=== Stroke order ===
asomtavruli

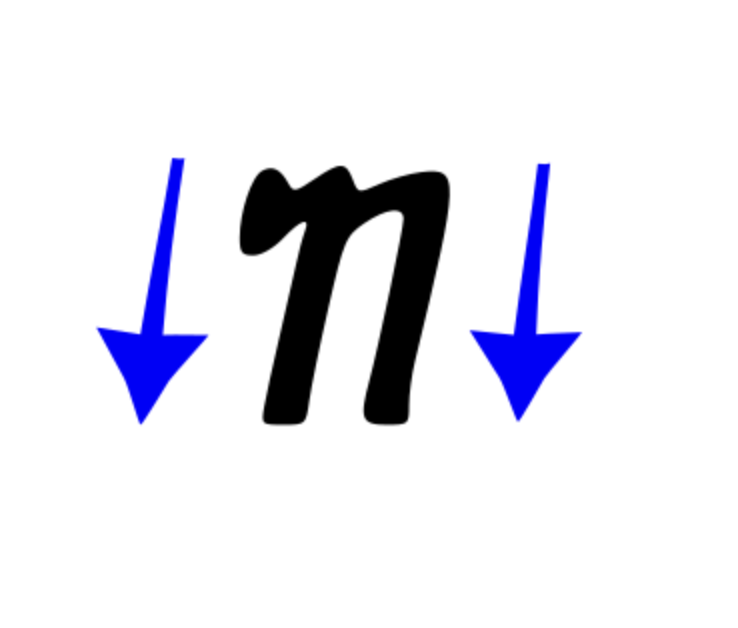
nuskhuri

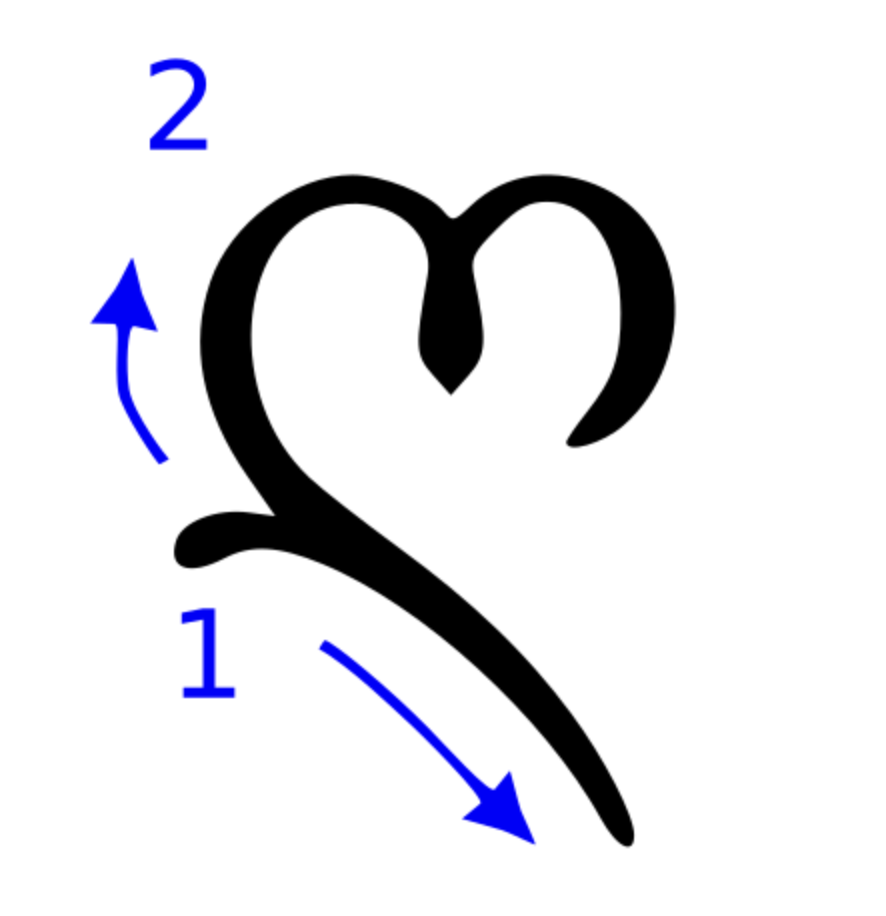
mkhedruli

== Computer encodings ==
Character information
Preview	Ⴖ		ⴖ		ღ		Ღ	
Unicode name	GEORGIAN CAPITAL LETTER GHAN		GEORGIAN SMALL LETTER GHAN		GEORGIAN LETTER GHAN		GEORGIAN MTAVRULI CAPITAL LETTER GHAN	
Encodings	decimal	hex	dec	hex	dec	hex	dec	hex
Unicode	4278	U+10B6	11542	U+2D16	4326	U+10E6	7334	U+1CA6
UTF-8	225 130 182	E1 82 B6	226 180 150	E2 B4 96	225 131 166	E1 83 A6	225 178 166	E1 B2 A6
Numeric character reference	&#4278;	&#x10B6;	&#11542;	&#x2D16;	&#4326;	&#x10E6;	&#7334;	&#x1CA6;

== Braille ==
mkhedruli

== See also ==
- Latin letter Ǧ
- Latin digraph Gh
- Cyrillic letter Ge with stroke

== Bibliography ==
- Mchedlidze, T. (1) The restored Georgian alphabet, Fulda, Germany, 2013
- Mchedlidze, T. (2) The Georgian script; Dictionary and guide, Fulda, Germany, 2013
- Machavariani, E. Georgian manuscripts, Tbilisi, 2011
- The Unicode Standard, Version 6.3, (1) Georgian, 1991-2013
- The Unicode Standard, Version 6.3, (2) Georgian Supplement, 1991-2013
