= Ge with breve =

Cyrillic letter

- Г̆ г̆

Usage
- Type: alphabetic
- Language of origin: Abkhaz language
- Sound values: [gʲ]

History
- Transliterations: Гь

Ge with breve (Г̆ г̆; italics: Г̆ г̆) is a letter of the Cyrillic script. It was formerly used in the Abkhaz language.

== Usage ==
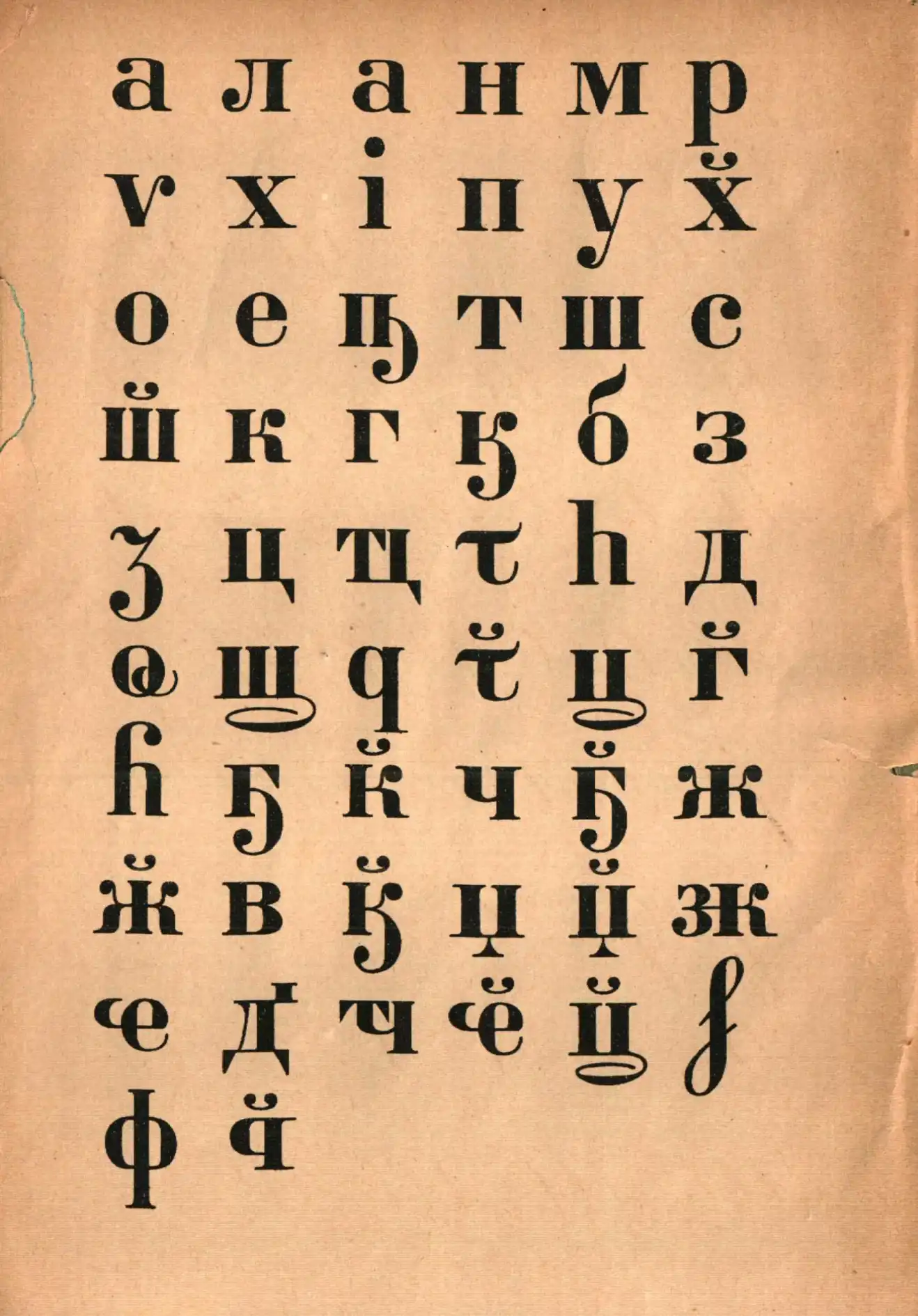
A page from a 1909 primer of Abkhaz

Ge with breve represented the phoneme [gʲ] in Abkhaz and corresponds to modern Гь.

== Computing codes ==
Character information
Preview	Г		г		̆	
Unicode name	CYRILLIC CAPITAL LETTER; GHE		CYRILLIC SMALL LETTER; GHE		COMBINING BREVE	
Encodings	decimal	hex	dec	hex	dec	hex
Unicode	1043	U+0413	1075	U+0433	774	U+0306
UTF-8	208 147	D0 93	208 179	D0 B3	204 134	CC 86
Numeric character reference	&#1043;	&#x413;	&#1075;	&#x433;	&#774;	&#x306;
Named character reference	&Gcy;		&gcy;			

== See also ==
- Г г : Cyrillic letter Ge
- Ğ ğ : Latin letter G with breve - a Turkish and Azerbaijani letter
