= Ge with descender =

Cyrillic letter used in four languages

- Ӷ ӷ
- Г̡ г̡

Usage
- Writing system: Cyrillic
- Type: Alphabetic
- Sound values: [ɣ], [ʁ], [ɢ]

History
- Development: Γ: Г; Ӷ ӷ
- Variations: Г̡ г̡

Ge with descender (Ӷ ӷ; italics: Ӷ ӷ) is a letter of the Cyrillic script formed from the Cyrillic letter Ge (Г г Г г) by adding a descender. In Unicode this letter is called "Ghe with descender".

== Usage ==
Ge with descender is used in the alphabets of the following languages:

Language	Pronunciation
Abkhaz	voiced velar fricative or voiced uvular fricative /ɣ ~ ʁ/
Ket	voiced uvular plosive /ɢ/ or voiced uvular fricative /ʁ/
Nivkh	voiced uvular plosive /ɢ/
Siberian Yupik	voiced uvular plosive /ɢ/

== Variants ==
Ge with descender can sometimes appear as having a hook instead of a descender (sometimes Г̡ г̡, italics: Г̡ г̡), as an allograph found in Ket and sometimes Nivkh, and in the transcription of Eskaleut languages.

=== Usage ===
Ge with hook is used in the literature of Nivkh to represent the voiced uvular plosive [ɢ], and is sometimes represented instead with the ge with descender ⟨Ӷ ӷ⟩. It is used, in particular, in the Sakhalin dialects and not in the Amur dialect of the Russian Far East.

=== Forms and variants ===
Ge with hook has the hook attached to the right in Nivkh in Taksami 1996, as well as Eskaleut languages works such as Ainana 1994, and Vakhtin 2003, in the Chaplino dialect in Menovchtchikov 1988, Menovchtchikov and Vakhtin 1990, Sigunylik 2003, in Naukan Yupik in Menovchtchikov 1975.

Form used in Eskaleut languages, in Ket or in Nivkh.

== Computing codes ==
Character information
Preview	Ӷ		ӷ	
Unicode name	CYRILLIC CAPITAL LETTER; GHE WITH DESCENDER		CYRILLIC SMALL LETTER; GHE WITH DESCENDER	
Encodings	decimal	hex	dec	hex
Unicode	1270	U+04F6	1271	U+04F7
UTF-8	211 182	D3 B6	211 183	D3 B7
Numeric character reference	&#1270;	&#x4F6;	&#1271;	&#x4F7;

=== Ge with hook ===
Ge with hook has not yet been encoded in Unicode. In theory, it is possible to use the letter ge with descender ⟨Ӷ, ӷ⟩ with fonts or adapted applications in which these have the form of this letter, however, it is possible to be in some way approximate it as ge with a combining palatal hook so ⟨Г̡⟩ for uppercase and ⟨г̡⟩ for lowercase. This form is sometimes used instead of.

== See also ==
- Г г : Cyrillic letter Ge
- Ҕ ҕ : Cyrillic letter Ge with middle hook
- Ғ ғ : Cyrillic letter Ge with stroke
- Nivkh languages
- Cyrilic script
