= Gimel =

Third letter of many Semitic alphabets

← Bet Gimel Dalet →
- Phoenician: 𐤂
- Hebrew: ג
- Samaritan: ࠂ
- Aramaic: 𐡂
- Syriac: ܓ
- Nabataean: 𐢄
- Arabic: ج
- South Arabian: 𐩴
- Geʽez: ገ
- North Arabian: 𐪔
- Ugaritic: 𐎂
- Phonemic representation: ɡ, ɟ, ɣ, d͡ʒ, ʒ
- Position in alphabet: 3
- Numerical value: 3

Alphabetic derivatives of the Phoenician
- Greek: Γ
- Latin: C, G, Ȝ, Ɣ
- Cyrillic: Г, Ґ, Ғ

Gimel is the third (in alphabetical order; fifth in spelling order) letter of the Semitic abjads, including Phoenician gīml 𐤂, Hebrew gīmel ג, Aramaic gāmal 𐡂, Syriac gāmal ܓ Arabic jīm ج. Ancient North Arabian 𐪔, South Arabian 𐩴, and Ge'ez ገ.

Its sound value in the original Phoenician and in all derived alphabets, except Arabic, is a voiced velar plosive [ɡ]; in Modern Standard Arabic, it represents either a /d͡ʒ/ or /ʒ/ for most Arabic speakers except in Northern Egypt, the southern parts of Yemen and some parts of Oman where it is pronounced as the voiced velar plosive [ɡ].

In its Proto-Canaanite form, the letter may have been named after a weapon that was either a staff sling or a throwing stick (spear thrower), ultimately deriving from a Proto-Sinaitic glyph based on the hieroglyph below:

T14

The Phoenician letter gave rise to the Greek gamma (Γ), the Latin C, G, Ɣ and Ȝ, and the Cyrillic Г, Ґ, and Ғ.

== Arabic Jīm ==
Ǧīm Jīm جيم
- ج

Usage
- Writing system: Arabic script
- Type: Abjad
- Language of origin: Arabic language
- Sound values: /d͡ʒ/, /ʒ/, /g/, /ɟ/
- Alphabetical position: 5

History
- Development: 𓌙: 𐤂; 𐡂; 𐢄; ح; ج
- Transliterations: ǧ, j, g

Other
- Writing direction: Right-to-left

The Arabic letter ج is named جيم, jīm [d͡ʒiːm, ʒiːm, ɡiːm, ɟiːm]. It has four forms, and is written in several ways depending on its position in the word:

Position in word:	Isolated	Final	Medial	Initial
Glyph form: (Help)	ج	ـج	ـجـ	جـ

The similarity to ḥāʼ ح is likely a function of the original Syriac forms converging to a single symbol, requiring that one of them be distinguished as a dot; a similar process occurred to zāy and rāʾ.

=== Pronunciation ===
In all varieties of Arabic, cognate words will have consistent differences in pronunciation of the letter. The standard pronunciation taught outside the Arabic speaking world is an affricate [d͡ʒ], which was the agreed-upon pronunciation by the end of the nineteenth century to recite the Qur'an, this sound also corresponds to ġ /d͡ʒ/ in Maltese as in ġar "neighbor" and Arabic جار jār "neighbor" both pronounced /d͡ʒaːr/. It is pronounced as a fricative [ʒ] in most of Northern Africa and the Levant, and [ɡ] is the prestigious and most common pronunciation in Egypt, which is also found in Southern Arabian Peninsula. Differences in pronunciation occur because readers of Modern Standard Arabic pronounce words following their native dialects.

Egyptians always use the letter to represent [ɡ] as well as in names and loanwords, such as جولف "golf". However, ⟨ج⟩ may be used in Egypt to transcribe /ʒ~d͡ʒ/ (normally pronounced [ʒ]) or if there is a need to distinguish them completely, then ⟨چ⟩ is used to represent /ʒ/, which is also a proposal for Mehri and Soqotri languages.

The literary standard pronunciations

- [d͡ʒ]: In most of the Arabian Peninsula, northern Algeria, Iraq, southern Egypt, mountainous Levant. This is also the commonly taught pronunciation outside the Arabic speaking countries when Literary Arabic is taught as a foreign language. It is the agreed-upon pronunciation to recite the Qur'an.
- [ʒ]: In the Levant (urban centers), Southern Iraq, most of Northwestern Africa, and southern Algeria (Oran), and by some speakers in western Arabia (Hejaz).
- [g]: In Egypt, coastal Yemen (west and south), southwestern and eastern Oman.
- [ɟ]: In Sudan, northern Arabia, and hinterland Yemen.
- [ɟ͡ʝ]: attested among some bedouin in Saudi Arabia.

Non-literary pronunciation

- [j]: In eastern Arabian Peninsula and Iraq but only colloquial speech, for example Kuwaiti Arabic وايد [ˈwɑːjəd] “a lot” vs. Najdi Arabic واجد [ˈwæːd͡ʒɪd].

=== Historical pronunciation ===
While in most Semitic languages, e.g. Aramaic, Hebrew, Ge'ez, Old South Arabian the equivalent letter represents a [ɡ], Arabic is considered unique among them where the Jīm ⟨ج⟩ was palatalized to an affricate [d͡ʒ] or a fricative [ʒ] in most dialects from classical times. While there is variation in Modern Arabic varieties, most of them reflect this palatalized pronunciation except in coastal Yemeni and Omani dialects as well as in Egypt, where it is pronounced [g].

It is not well known when palatalization occurred or the probability of it being connected to the pronunciation of Qāf ⟨ق⟩ as a [ɡ], but in most of the Arabian peninsula (Saudi Arabia, Kuwait, Qatar, Bahrain, UAE and parts of Yemen and Oman), the ⟨ج⟩ represents a [d͡ʒ] and ⟨ق⟩ represents a [ɡ], except in coastal Yemen and southern Oman where ⟨ج⟩ represents a [ɡ] and ⟨ق⟩ represents a [q], which shows a strong correlation between the palatalization of ⟨ج⟩ to [d͡ʒ] and the pronunciation of the ⟨ق⟩ as a [ɡ] as shown in the table below:

Language varieties	Pronunciation of the letters	
Language varieties	ج	ق
Proto-Semitic	[ɡ]	[kʼ]
Dialects in parts of Oman and Yemen^{1}	[ɡ]	[q]
Modern Standard Arabic^{2}	[d͡ʒ]	[q]
Dialects in most of the Arabian Peninsula	[d͡ʒ]	[ɡ]

Notes:

1. Western and southern Yemen: Taʽizzi, Adeni and Tihamiyya dialects (coastal Yemen), in addition to southwestern (Salalah region) and eastern Oman, including Muscat, the capital.
2. As used in the Arabian Peninsula: in Sanaa; ق is [ɡ] in Sanʽani dialect and also in the literary standard (local MSA), whereas the literary standard pronunciation in Sudan is [ɢ] or [ɡ]. For the pronunciation of ج in Modern Standard Arabic, check Jīm.

=== Pronunciation across other languages ===
Pronunciation of ⟨ج⟩ in other languages
Language	Alphabet name	Pronunciation (IPA)
Azeri	Arabic script	/d͡ʒ/
Balochi		/d͡ʒ/
Brahui		/d͡ʒ/
Hindko		/d͡ʒ/
Javanese	Pegon	/d͡ʒ/
Kashmiri		/d͡ʒ/
Kurdish	Sorani	/d͡ʒ/
Malay	Jawi	/d͡ʒ/
Pashto		/d͡ʒ/
Persian		/d͡ʒ/
Punjabi	Shahmukhi	/d͡ʒ/
Saraiki		/d͡ʒ/
Sindhi	Arabic script	/d͡ʒ/
Swahili	Ajami	/d͡ʒ/
Urdu		/d͡ʒ/
Uyghur		/d͡ʒ/
Uzbek	Arabic script	/d͡ʒ/
Hausa	Ajami	/d͡ʒ/ or /ʒ/
Kazakh	Tote Jazu	/d͡ʒ/ or /ʒ/

Note: In Kazakh ⟨ج⟩ is pronounced /d͡ʒ/ in some dialects, such as in the south and east. Hausa ⟨ج⟩ is pronounced /d͡ʒ/, in the Hausa of Niger, /d͡ʒ/ is usually pronounced [ʒ].

=== Variant ===
A variant letter named che is used in Persian, with three dots below instead having just one dot below. However, it is not included on one of the 28 letters on the Arabic alphabet. It is thus written as:

Position in word:	Isolated	Final	Medial	Initial
Glyph form: (Help)	چ	ـچ	ـچـ	چـ

== Hebrew gimel ==
=== Variations ===
Orthographic variants
Various print fonts			Cursive Hebrew	Solitreo	Rashi script
Serif	Sans-serif	Monospaced	Cursive Hebrew	Solitreo	Rashi script
ג	ג	ג			

Hebrew spelling: גִּימֶל

Bertrand Russell posits that the letter's form is a conventionalized image of a camel. The letter may be the shape of the walking animal's head, neck, and forelegs. Barry B. Powell, a specialist in the history of writing, states “It is hard to imagine how gimel = ‘camel’ can be derived from the picture of a camel (it may show his hump, or his head and neck!)”. Solomon Gandz suggests instead that it is derived from "weapon" or "battle-axe".

Gimel is one of the six letters which can receive a dagesh qal. The two functions of dagesh are distinguished as either qal (light) or hazaq (strong). The six letters that can receive a dagesh qal are bet, gimel, daled, kaph, pe, and taf. Three of them (bet, kaph, and pe) have their sound value changed in modern Hebrew from the fricative to the plosive by adding a dagesh. The other three represent the same pronunciation in modern Hebrew, but have had alternate pronunciations at other times and places. They are essentially pronounced in the fricative as ג gh غ, dh ذ and th ث. In the Temani pronunciation, gimel represents /ɡ/, /ʒ/, or /d͡ʒ/ when with a dagesh, and /ɣ/ without a dagesh. In modern Hebrew, the combination ג׳ (gimel followed by a geresh) is used in loanwords and foreign names to denote [d͡ʒ].

=== Significance ===
In gematria, gimel represents the number three.

It is written like a vav with a yud as a "foot", and is traditionally believed to resemble a person in motion; symbolically, a rich man running after a poor man to give him charity. In the Hebrew alphabet gimel directly precedes dalet, which signifies a poor or lowly man, given its similarity to the Hebrew word dal (b. Shabbat, 104a).

Gimel is also one of the seven letters which receive special crowns (called tagin) when written in a Sefer Torah. See shin, ayin, teth, nun, zayin, and tsadi.

The letter gimel is the electoral symbol for the United Torah Judaism party, and the party is often nicknamed Gimmel.

In Modern Hebrew, the frequency of usage of gimel, out of all the letters, is 1.26%.

== Syriac gamal/gomal ==
Gamal/Gomal
Madnḫaya Gamal
Serṭo Gomal
Esṭrangela Gamal

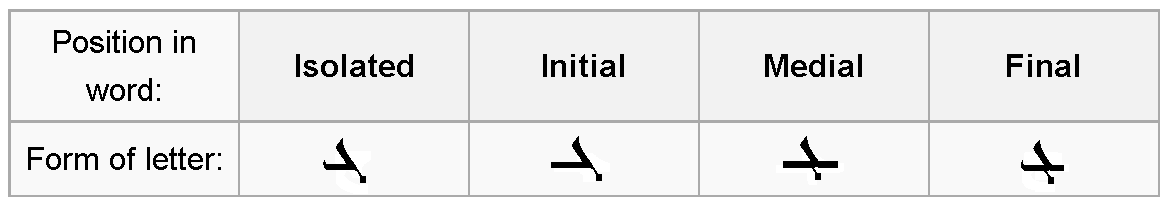

In the Syriac alphabet, the third letter is ܓ — Gamal in eastern pronunciation, Gomal in western pronunciation (ܓܵܡܵܠ). It is one of six letters that represent two associated sounds (the others are Bet, Dalet, Kaph, Pe and Taw). When Gamal/Gomal has a hard pronunciation (qûššāyâ ) it represents [ɡ], like "goat". When Gamal/Gomal has a soft pronunciation (rûkkāḵâ ) it traditionally represents [ɣ] (ܓ݂ܵܡܵܠ), or Ghamal/Ghomal. The letter, renamed Jamal/Jomal, is written with a tilde/tie either below or within it to represent the borrowed phoneme [d͡ʒ] (ܓ̰ܡܵܠ), which is used in Garshuni and some Neo-Aramaic languages to write loan and foreign words from Arabic or Persian.

== Other uses ==
=== Mathematics ===
The serif form $\gimel$ of the Hebrew letter gimel is occasionally used for the gimel function in mathematics.

== Character encodings ==
Character information
Preview	ג		ج		گ		ܓ		ࠂ		ℷ	
Unicode name	HEBREW LETTER GIMEL		ARABIC LETTER JEEM		ARABIC LETTER GAF		SYRIAC LETTER GAMAL		SAMARITAN LETTER GAMAN		GIMEL SYMBOL	
Encodings	decimal	hex	dec	hex	dec	hex	dec	hex	dec	hex	dec	hex
Unicode	1490	U+05D2	1580	U+062C	1711	U+06AF	1811	U+0713	2050	U+0802	8503	U+2137
UTF-8	215 146	D7 92	216 172	D8 AC	218 175	DA AF	220 147	DC 93	224 160 130	E0 A0 82	226 132 183	E2 84 B7
Numeric character reference	&#1490;	&#x5D2;	&#1580;	&#x62C;	&#1711;	&#x6AF;	&#1811;	&#x713;	&#2050;	&#x802;	&#8503;	&#x2137;
Named character reference											&gimel;	

Character information
Preview	𐎂		𐡂		𐤂	
Unicode name	UGARITIC LETTER GAMLA		IMPERIAL ARAMAIC LETTER GIMEL		PHOENICIAN LETTER GAML	
Encodings	decimal	hex	dec	hex	dec	hex
Unicode	66434	U+10382	67650	U+10842	67842	U+10902
UTF-8	240 144 142 130	F0 90 8E 82	240 144 161 130	F0 90 A1 82	240 144 164 130	F0 90 A4 82
UTF-16	55296 57218	D800 DF82	55298 56386	D802 DC42	55298 56578	D802 DD02
Numeric character reference	&#66434;	&#x10382;	&#67650;	&#x10842;	&#67842;	&#x10902;
