= G̃ =

Latin letter G with tilde

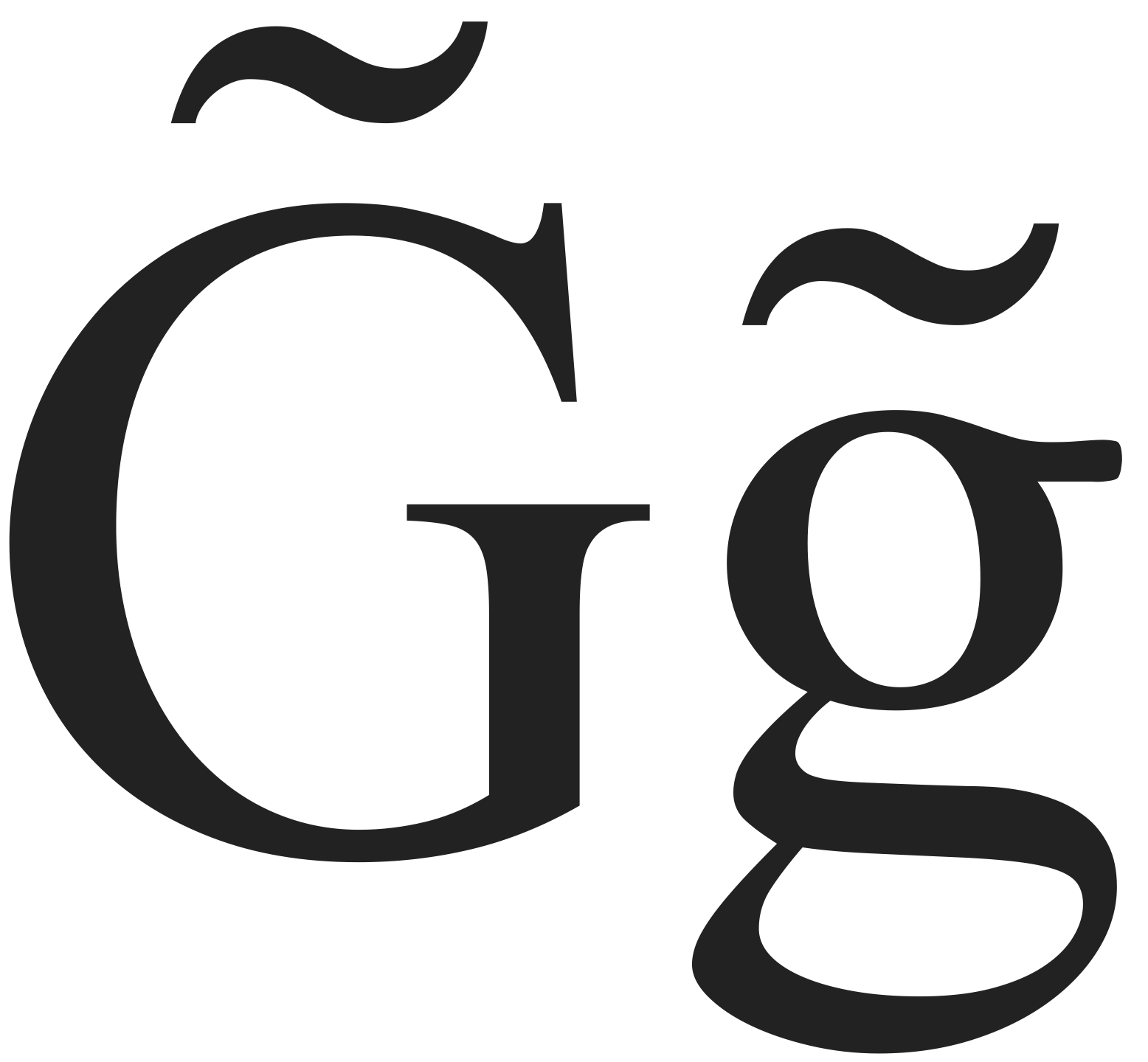
Doulos SIL glyphs for Majuscule and minuscule g̃.

G̃ / g̃ is a letter which combines the common letter G with a tilde.

The character does not exist in most alphabets. Examples of alphabets with this letter are:

- Guarani alphabet – where the tilde marks nasalization of /g/, representing the sound /ŋ/
- Filipino alphabet – during the Spanish colonial period and up to the mid-20th century, adopting Spanish orthography for the Tagalog language
- Sumerian language – an extinct language, where it is used to transcribe the cuneiform script.
- Northern Sámi orthography – g̃ appears in the Sámi alphabet used by Rask in Ræsonneret lappisk sproglære in 1832

The letter is also occasionally used as a (stylistic) substitute for G with breve (Ğ) in languages such as Turkish.

== Computer encoding ==
Unicode encodes g with tilde with a combining diacritical mark (U+0303 ◌̃ COMBINING TILDE), rather than a precomposed character. As such, the tilde may not align properly with some typefaces and systems. Additionally, owing to the difficulties in inputting this character, Guarani speakers often omit the diacritic altogether.

Letter	Unicode sequence	HTML	Windows (Note: Subject to application)
G̃	U+0047 U+0303	G&#x303;	G303 Alt+X
g̃	U+0067 U+0303	g&#x303;	g303 Alt+X
