= Mammad agha Shahtakhtinski =

Azerbaijani publicist, linguist and political writer (1846–1931)

Mammad Agha Shahtakhtinski
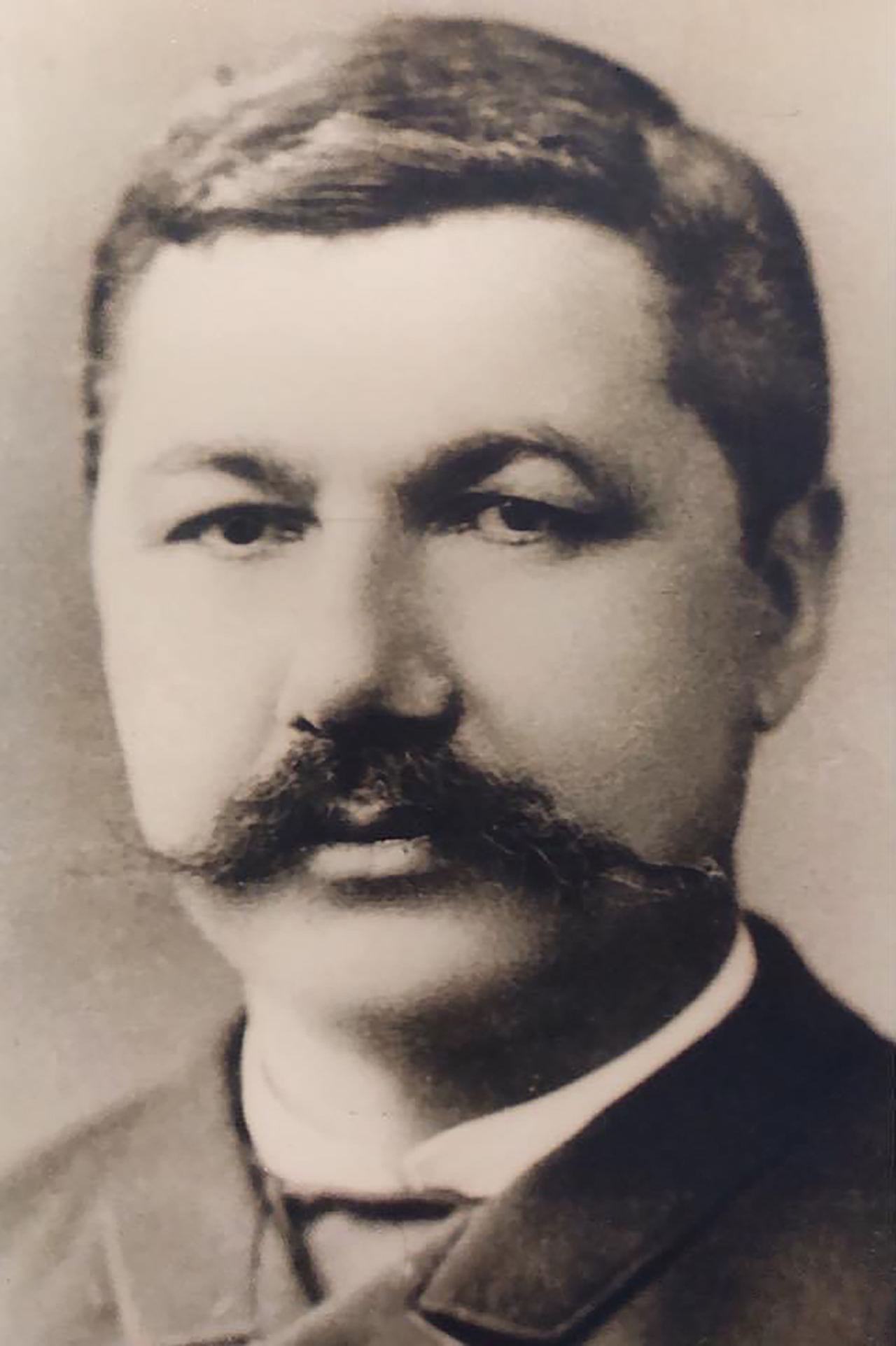

Member of Second Duma
- In office 6 February 1907 – October 1907

Personal details
- Born: 1846 Şahtaxtı, Georgia-Imeretia Governorate, Russian Empire
- Died: December 12, 1931 (aged 84–85) Baku, Azerbaijan Soviet Socialist Republic
- Education: Leipzig University; Institut national des langues et civilisations orientales École pratique des hautes études

Mammad agha Shahtakhtinski (Azerbaijani: Məhəmməd ağa Məhəmmədtağı sultan oğlu Şahtaxtılı; 1846 – 12 December 1931) was an Azerbaijani journalist, scholar, and political writer.

== Life and education ==
Shahtakhtinski was born into a noble Azeri family living in Şahtaxtı village, then a part of Georgia-Imeretia Governorate on 10 June 1848, or possibly 1846. He was raised Muslim and attended a religious school as a child. He attended Tiflis Classical Male Gymnasium, which he graduated from in 1863. He pursued higher education in Saint Petersburg, learning German in order to study in Germany. In 1869 he graduated from the Leipzig University with a degree in philosophy, history and law. In 1873, he enrolled in courses at the École des langues orientales but was forced to return to Russia in 1875 after his father's death.

Until the early 1890s he worked as a journalist publishing articles in the Russian newspapers Moskovskie Vedomosti, Novoe Vremia, Kavkaz etc. on various subjects ranging from linguistics and education to life in Persia and the Ottoman Empire. Between 1891 and 1893 he was appointed interim editor of the newspaper Kaspii (Russian: Каспій). His attempt to start an Azerbaijani language newspaper in Tbilisi was blocked by imperial censors in 1898. Not pursuing it, Shahtakhtinski returned to Paris to excel in Arabic, Persian and Turkish languages at the Collège de France and the École pratique des hautes études. His keen interest in these languages resulted in him being admitted into the prestigious Société Asiatique.

== Career ==
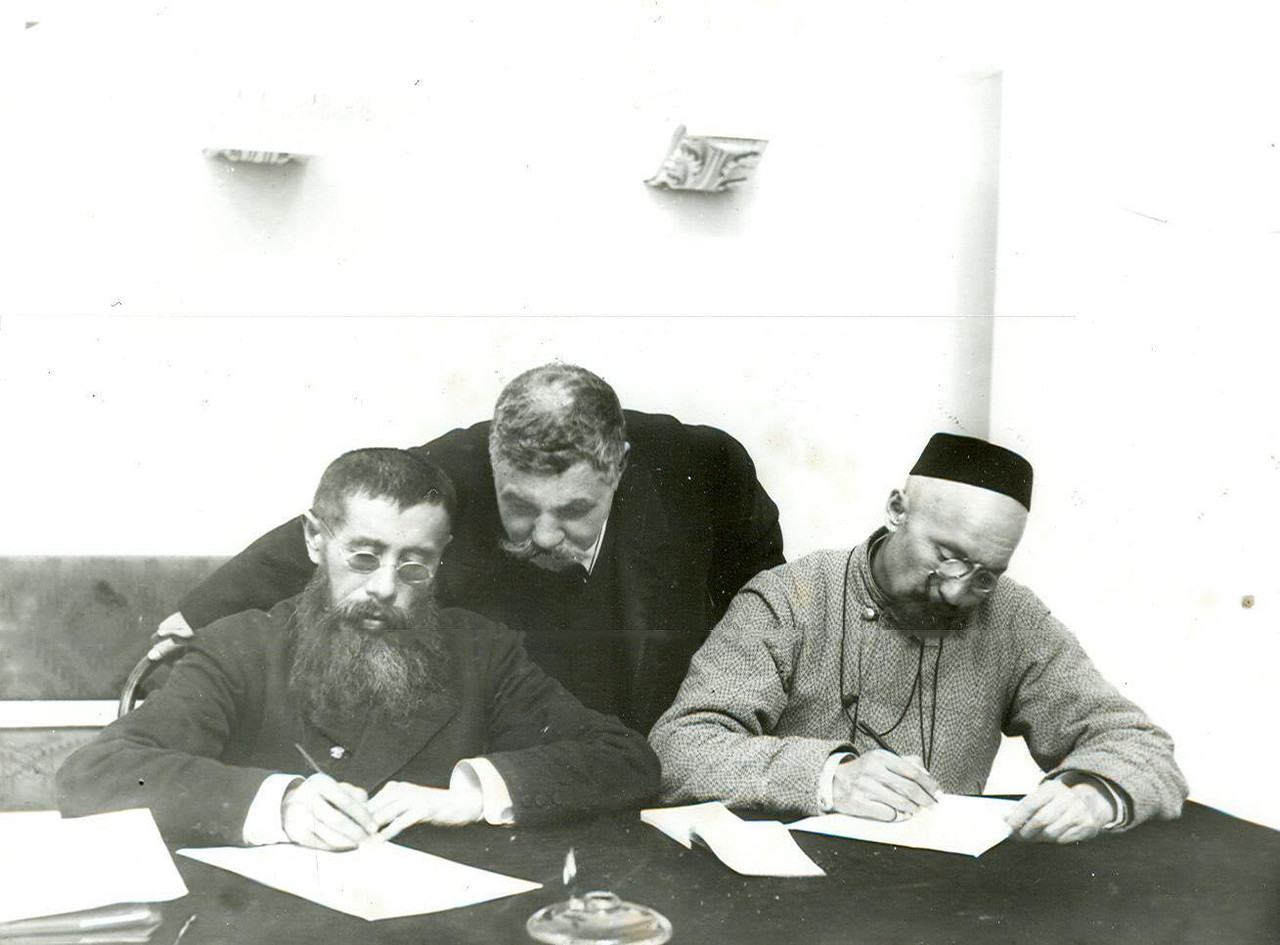
Shahtakhtinsky posing with Bakhitjan Karataev and Temirkali Norokonev

In 1902, Shahtakhtinski returned to Caucasus and settled in Tiflis. Here in March 1903, he founded the Azeri-language newspaper Sharg-i Rus (The Russian Orient) dedicated to the academic enlightenment of the Muslims of the Caucasus. His articles propagated the necessity of Europeanisation, which he saw as the only possible way to a stable and developed future. He sharply criticised Islamic fanaticism, which in his opinion was a major obstacle in the development of Azeri culture and was incompatible with the idea of progress. He also dismissed Pan-Turkism, a popular theory among Turkic-speaking scholars and political activists of the time, and propagated the use of folk Azeri as a literary language, as opposed to the common practice of using Ottoman Turkish. He was among the peacemakers during the bloody Armenian-Tatar massacres of 1905–1906.

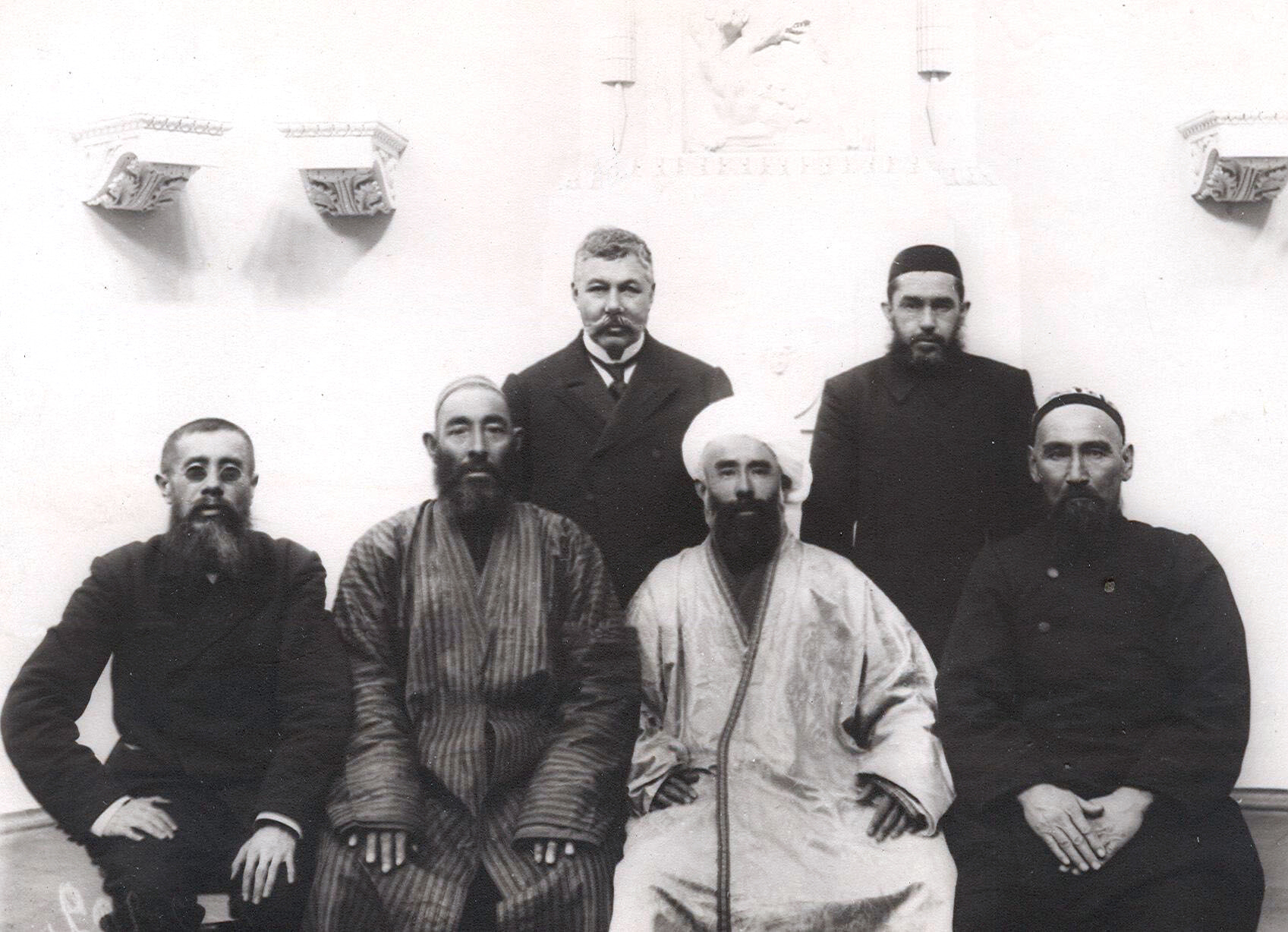
Shahtakhtinski among Central Asian members of Second Duma (standing left)

In 1907, he was elected to the State Duma of the Russian Empire of the Second Convocation. After dissolution of the Duma, he worked for Petersburg-based newspaper Russia (Russian: Россія), then edited by Pyotr Stolypin.

Between 1908 and 1918, Shahtakhtinski lived in various parts of the Middle East, including Anatolia, Iraq and Persia, meanwhile writing articles for Turkestan Times (Russian: Туркестанскія вѣдомости). During this time abroad, he worked at the Russian embassy to the Ottoman Empire as translator between 1909 and 1912. After the outbreak of the World War I in 1914, he worked as a translator at the Russian Ministry of Foreign Affairs. In 1919, he returned to then-independent Azerbaijan to give lectures at the newly established Baku State University.

== Alphabet reform proposal ==
Shahtakhtinski was among the numerous scholars who had followed Mirza Fatali Akhundov in proposing an alphabet reform for Azeri, suggesting to reform the existing Perso-Arabic script. The unsuitability of the Arabic alphabet to Turkic languages in general was in his opinion a major obstacle to the spread of literacy among Azeris. Between 1879 and 1903, Shahtakhtinski designed several model alphabets for Azeri, some of them Latin-based, however none of them was implemented in practice.

He attended Congress of the Peoples of the East, acting as an interpreter for Turkish, French, German, Persian and Arabic in 1920. In 1923, Shahtakhtinski as member of a special four-member committee developed a new Latin-script alphabet for Azeri, apparently based on one of Shahtakhtinski's earlier models. He defended this reform in First Turkology Congress in Baku (1926). Shahtakhtinski died in 1931. His goal, the new alphabet, was put into official use on par with the Perso-Arabic alphabet, which it completely replaced in 1928, and was used until 1939 when it itself was replaced by Cyrillic.

== Works ==
- Comment sauver la Turquie ? (1901, Paris)
- Explanatory note on the phonetic oriental alphabet (1902, Tbilisi)
- The crisis of Muslim vitality (1909, Saint Petersburg) (English)
