= Ǵ =

Latin letter G with acute accent

Majuscule and minuscule ǵ.

Ǵ (minuscule: ǵ) is a letter of the Latin alphabet, formed by putting an acute accent over the letter G. The letter represents the Pashto letter geh (ږ), the Macedonian letter gje (Ѓ), and the Karakalpak phoneme /ɣ/ (Cyrillic Ғ), and appears in the Cantonese Yale multigraphs nǵ and nǵh. The letter is also used to transcribe the Old Church Slavic letter djerv (Ꙉ). In Võro it is used to represent /kʲ/, the short palatalised velar plosive and in Finno-Ugric transcription it is used for /gʲ/, the palatalised voiced velar plosive.

The 2019 reformed alphabet for Uzbek also contains this letter. It is currently represented by Gʻ (Cyrillic Ғ).

The 2018 revision of the Kazakh Latin alphabet uses the letter as a replacement for the Cyrillic Ғ, which represents [ʁ]. In 2019, the letter was replaced by Ğ.

== Computing code ==
Character information
Preview	Ǵ		ǵ	
Unicode name	LATIN CAPITAL LETTER G WITH ACUTE		LATIN SMALL LETTER G WITH ACUTE	
Encodings	decimal	hex	dec	hex
Unicode	500	U+01F4	501	U+01F5
UTF-8	199 180	C7 B4	199 181	C7 B5
Numeric character reference	&#500;	&#x1F4;	&#501;	&#x1F5;
Named character reference			&gacute;	

== See also ==
- Ѓ, its Cyrillic counterpart
