= Ge with stroke and hook =

Cyrillic letter used for /ʁ/ in Nivkh

Usage
- Writing system: Cyrillic
- Type: Alphabetic
- Sound values: ʁ

Ge with stroke and hook or descender (Ӻ ӻ; italics: Ӻ ӻ) is a letter of the Cyrillic script, formed from the Cyrillic letter Ge (Г г Г г) by adding a horizontal stroke and a descender. In Unicode this letter is called "Ghe with stroke and hook". It is similar in shape to the Latin letter F with hook (Ƒ ƒ) but is unrelated.

The letter is only used for the Nivkh language, where it represents the voiced uvular fricative /ʁ/, like the r in French. There are two common designs: the original form with a straight descender, and a variant with a hook designed by Просвещение (Enlightenment) publishing house.

== Computing codes ==
Character information
Preview	Ӻ		ӻ	
Unicode name	CYRILLIC CAPITAL LETTER; GHE WITH STROKE AND HOOK		CYRILLIC SMALL LETTER; GHE WITH STROKE AND HOOK	
Encodings	decimal	hex	dec	hex
Unicode	1274	U+04FA	1275	U+04FB
UTF-8	211 186	D3 BA	211 187	D3 BB
Numeric character reference	&#1274;	&#x4FA;	&#1275;	&#x4FB;

== See also ==
- Г г : Cyrillic Ge
- Ғ ғ : Cyrillic Ge with stroke
- Ƒ ƒ : Latin letter F with hook
- Nivkh
- Cyrillic characters in Unicode
