= Ge with middle hook =

Cyrillic letter used for /ɣ/ in Yukaghir and Yakut

- Ҕ ҕ

Usage
- Writing system: Cyrillic
- Type: Alphabetic
- Language of origin: Yakut, Yukaghir
- Sound values: /ɣ/
- In Unicode: U+0494, U+0495

Ge with middle hook (Ҕ ҕ; italics: Ҕ ҕ) is a letter of the Cyrillic script used in the Yukaghir and Yakut languages to represent the voiced velar fricative /ɣ/. In Unicode, this letter is called "Ghe with middle hook". The letter was invented in 1844 by Andreas Johan Sjögren for the Ossetian language from the contraction of Cyrillic Г and Gothic 𐌷 (hagl).

== Usage ==
⟨Ҕ⟩ is the fifth letter of the Yakut alphabet, placed between ⟨Г⟩ and ⟨Д⟩. It was formerly also the seventh letter of the Abkhaz alphabet, placed between the digraphs ⟨Гә⟩ and ⟨Ҕь⟩; it was replaced by the letter ⟨Ӷ⟩.

Ge with middle hook was also used in the Chuvash language, in Ivan Yakovlev's initial 47-letter alphabet.

== Computing codes ==
Character information
Preview	Ҕ		ҕ	
Unicode name	CYRILLIC CAPITAL LETTER; GHE WITH MIDDLE HOOK		CYRILLIC SMALL LETTER; GHE WITH MIDDLE HOOK	
Encodings	decimal	hex	dec	hex
Unicode	1172	U+0494	1173	U+0495
UTF-8	210 148	D2 94	210 149	D2 95
Numeric character reference	&#1172;	&#x494;	&#1173;	&#x495;

== See also ==
- Г г : Cyrillic letter Ge
- Ғ ғ : Cyrillic letter Ghayn
- Ӷ ӷ : Cyrillic letter Ge with descender
- Ҕ̀ ҕ̀ : Cyrillic letter Ge with middle hook and grave
