= G =

Seventh letter of the Latin alphabet

- G g

Usage
- Writing system: Latin script
- Type: Alphabetic
- Language of origin: Latin language
- Sound values: [ɡ]; [d͡ʒ]; [ʒ] (Note: as in the French word visage); [ŋ]; [j~ʝ]; [ɣ~ɣ̞]; [χ]; [x]; [d͡z]; [ɟ]; [k]; [ɠ]; [ɢ]; [z]
- In Unicode: U+0047, U+0067, U+0261
- Alphabetical position: 7

History
Development
T14
        - Γ γ
          - 𐌂
            - C
              - G g
- Time period: c. 300 BCE to present
- Descendants: ₲; Ȝ; Ᵹ
- Sisters: C; Г; ࠂ; ℷ; 𐡂; Գ գ; (ג ﺝ ﮒ ܓ)
- Transliterations: C

Other
- Associated graphs: gh, g(x)
- Writing direction: Left-to-right

G (minuscule: g) is the seventh letter of the Latin alphabet, used in the modern English alphabet, the alphabets of other Western European languages, and others worldwide. Its name in English is gee (pronounced /ˈdʒiː/), plural gees.

The lowercase version can be written in two forms: the single-storey (sometimes "opentail") form ⟨⟩ and the double-storey (sometimes "looptail") form ⟨⟩. The former is commonly used in handwriting and typefaces based on it, especially in texts intended to be read by children; it is the style used by most sans-serif typefaces, such as Helvetica. The latter form is used by most serif typefaces, such as Times.

== History ==
Egyptian	Phoenician gaml	Western Greek Gamma	Etruscan C	Old Latin C	Latin G
T14	Phoenician gimel	Greek Gamma	Etruscan C	Old Latin	Latin G

The evolution of the Latin alphabet's G can be traced back to the Latin alphabet's predecessor, the Greek alphabet. The voiced velar stop was represented by the third letter of the Greek alphabet, gamma (Γ), which was later adopted by the Etruscan language. Latin then borrowed this "rounded form" of gamma, C, to represent the same sound in words such as recei, which was likely an early dative form of rex, meaning "king", as found in an "early Latin inscription." Over time, however, the letter C shifted to represent the voiceless velar stop, leading to the displacement of the letter K. Scholars believe that this change can be attributed to the influence of the Etruscan language on Latin.

Afterwards, the letter 'G' was introduced in the Old Latin period as a variant of 'C' to distinguish voiced /ɡ/ from voiceless /k/, and G was used to represent a voiced velar stop from this point on and C "stood for the unvoiced velar only".

The recorded originator of 'G' is freedman Spurius Carvilius Ruga, who added letter G to the teaching of the Roman alphabet during the 3rd century BCE: he was the first Roman to open a fee-paying school, around 230 BCE. At this time, 'K' had fallen out of favor, and 'C', which had formerly represented both /ɡ/ and /k/ before open vowels, had come to express /k/ in all environments.

Ruga's positioning of 'G' shows that alphabetic order related to the letters' values as Greek numerals was a concern even in the 3rd century BCE. According to some records, the original seventh letter, 'Z', had been purged from the Latin alphabet somewhat earlier in the 3rd century BCE by the Roman censor Appius Claudius, who found it distasteful and foreign. Sampson (1985) suggests that: "Evidently the order of the alphabet was felt to be such a concrete thing that a new letter could be added in the middle only if a 'space' was created by the dropping of an old letter."

George Hempl proposed in 1899 that there never was such a "space" in the alphabet and that in fact 'G' was a direct descendant of zeta. Zeta took shapes like ⊏ in some of the Old Italic scripts; the development of the monumental form 'G' from this shape would be exactly parallel to the development of 'C' from gamma. He suggests that the pronunciation /k/ > /ɡ/ was due to contamination from the also similar-looking 'K'.

Eventually, both velar consonants /k/ and /ɡ/ developed palatalized allophones before front vowels; consequently in today's Romance languages, ⟨c⟩ and ⟨g⟩ have different sound values depending on context (known as hard and soft C and hard and soft G). Because of French influence, English language orthography shares this feature.

=== Typographic variants ===
Typographic variants include a double-storey and a single-storey g.

The modern lowercase g has two typographic variants: the single-storey (sometimes "opentail") g, and the double-storey (sometimes "looptail") g. The single-storey form derives from the majuscule (uppercase) form by raising the serif that distinguishes it from 'c' to the top of the loop (thus closing the loop), and extending the vertical stroke downward and to the left. The double-storey form (g) had developed similarly, except that some ornate forms then extended the tail back to the right, and to the left again, forming a closed bowl or loop. In the double-storey version, a small top stroke in the upper-right, often terminating in an orb shape, is called an "ear". The loop-tail form is the original one, as seen in 9th century Carolingian script; evolving over centuries of monastic copying, the open-tail variant came to predominate and it was this that Gutenberg adopted when creating the first Blackletter typefaces – until that in turn was replaced by Humanist minuscule, which reasserted the closed-tail form.

Generally, the two forms are complementary and interchangeable; the form displayed is a typeface selection choice. In Unicode, the two appearances are generally treated as glyph variants with no semantic difference. Most serif typefaces use the looptail form (for example, g) and most sans-serif typefaces use the opentail form (for example, g) but the code point in both cases is U+0067. For applications where the single-storey variant must be distinguished (such as strict IPA in a typeface where the usual g character is double-storey), the character U+0261 ɡ LATIN SMALL LETTER SCRIPT G is available, as well as an upper case version, U+A7AC Ɡ LATIN CAPITAL LETTER SCRIPT G.

Occasionally the difference has been exploited to provide contrast. In the International Phonetic Alphabet, opentail ⟨⟩ has always represented a voiced velar plosive, while looptail ⟨⟩ represented a voiced velar fricative from 1895 to 1900. In 1948, the Council of the International Phonetic Association recognized ⟨ɡ⟩ and ⟨⟩ as typographic equivalents, and this decision was reaffirmed in 1993. While the 1949 Principles of the International Phonetic Association recommended the use of ⟨⟩ for a velar plosive and ⟨ɡ⟩ for an advanced one for languages where it is preferable to distinguish the two, such as Russian, this practice never caught on. The 1999 Handbook of the International Phonetic Association, the successor to the Principles, abandoned the recommendation and acknowledged both shapes as acceptable variants.

In 2018, a study found that native English speakers have little conscious awareness of the looptail form (g).The authors write: "Despite being questioned repeatedly, and despite being informed directly that G has two lowercase print forms, nearly half of the participants failed to reveal any knowledge of the looptail 'g', and only 1 of the 38 participants was able to write looptail 'g' correctly".

== Use in writing systems ==
Pronunciation of ⟨g⟩ by language
Orthography	Phonemes	Environment
Afrikaans	/χ/	
Arabic romanization	/ɡ/	One variant for jīm (ج) in Standard Arabic. However, the digraph gh is used to romanize ghayn غ, the sound /ɣ/.
Azeri	/ɟ/	
Catalan	/ɡ/	Except before e, i
Catalan	/(d)ʒ/	Before e, i
Standard Chinese (Pinyin)	/k/	
Danish	silent	After long ⟨i, y, u⟩; in the words jeg, og, også
Danish	[j]	After long ⟨a, e, æ, ø⟩ or ⟨l⟩
Danish	[w]	After long ⟨o, å⟩ or ⟨r⟩; after long ⟨a⟩ preceded by ⟨r⟩; after ⟨a⟩ in compounds and a few nouns
Danish	[ɕ]	in some loanwords (e. g. garage)
Danish	[k]	elsewhere
Dutch	/ɣ/ or /χ/	
English	/ɡ/	Any
English	/dʒ/	Before e, i, y
English	/ʒ/	Before e, i in more recent loanwords from French
English	silent	Some words, initial <gn>, and word-finally before a consonant
Esperanto	/ɡ/	
Faroese	/j/	soft, lenited; see Faroese phonology
Faroese	/k/	hard
Faroese	/tʃ/	soft
Faroese	/v/	after a, æ, á, e, o, ø and before u
Faroese	/w/	after ó, u, ú and before a, i, or u
Faroese	silent	after a, æ, á, e, o, ø and before a
Fijian	/ŋ/	
French	/ɡ/	Except before e, i, y
French	/ʒ/	Before e, i, y
Galician	/ɡ/ ~ /ħ/	Except before e, i, see Gheada for consonant variation
Galician	/ʃ/	Before e, i, obsolete, replaced by ⟨x⟩
Greek romanization	/ɡ/	Ancient Greek
Greek romanization	/ɣ/	Modern Greek except before ai, e, i, oi, y
Greek romanization	/ʝ/	Modern Greek before ai, e, i, oi, y
Icelandic	/c/	soft
Icelandic	/k/	hard
Icelandic	/ɣ/	hard, lenited; see Icelandic phonology
Icelandic	/j/	soft, lenited
Irish	/ɡ/	Except after i or before e, i
Irish	/ɟ/	After i or before e, i
Italian	/ɡ/	Except before e, i
Italian	/dʒ/	Before e, i
Malay	/g/	
Norman	/ɡ/	Except before e, i
Norman	/dʒ/	Before e, i
Norwegian	/ɡ/	Except before ei, i, j, øy, y
Norwegian	/j/	Before ei, i, j, øy, y
Portuguese	/ɡ/	Except before e, i, y
Portuguese	/ʒ/	Before e, i, y
Romanian	/ɡ/	Except before e, i
Romanian	/dʒ/	Before e, i
Romansh	/ɡ/	Except before e, i
Romansh	/dʑ/	Before e, i
Samoan	/ŋ/	
Scottish Gaelic	/k/	Except after i or before e, i
Scottish Gaelic	/kʲ/	After i or before e, i
Spanish	/ɡ/	Except before e, i, y
Spanish	/x/	Before e, i, y
Swedish	/ɡ/	Except before ä, e, i, ö, y
Swedish	/j/	Before ä, e, i, ö, y
Swedish	/ɧ/	Before e in some French loanwords, such as "giraff", "genre" "geni" and "generös".
Turkish	/ɡ/	Except before e, i, ö, ü
Turkish	/ɟ/	Before e, i, ö, ü
Vietnamese	/ɣ/	
Vietnamese	/z/ ~ /j/	Before i

=== English ===
In English, the letter appears either alone or in some digraphs. Alone, it represents

- a voiced velar plosive (/ɡ/ or "hard" ⟨g⟩), as in goose, gargoyle, and game;
- a voiced palato-alveolar affricate (/d͡ʒ/ or "soft" ⟨g⟩), predominates before ⟨i⟩, ⟨e⟩ or ⟨y⟩, as in giant, ginger, and geology; or
- a voiced palato-alveolar sibilant (/ʒ/) in post-medieval loanwords from French, such as rouge, beige, genre

⟨g⟩ is predominantly soft before ⟨e⟩, the digraphs ⟨ae⟩ (see Gaea, Pangaea) and ⟨oe⟩, ⟨i⟩, or ⟨y⟩, and hard otherwise. It is hard in those derivations from Ancient Greek γυνή (gynḗ) meaning woman where initial-worded as such. Soft ⟨g⟩ is also used in many words that came into English from medieval church/academic Latin, French, Spanish, Italian or Portuguese – these tend to, in other ways in English, closely align to their Ancient Latin and Greek roots (such as fragile, logic or magic). There remain widely used a few English words of non-Romance origin where ⟨g⟩ is hard followed by ⟨e⟩ or ⟨i⟩ (get, give, gift, gig, girl, giggle), and very few in which ⟨g⟩ is soft though followed by ⟨a⟩ such as gaol, which since the 20th century is almost always written as "jail", and margarine. The word fungi, although from Latin origin, is usually pronounced with a hard ⟨g⟩. The letter ⟨g⟩ before the digraph ⟨ae⟩ in the word algae is usually pronounced as a soft ⟨g⟩, but pronunciation with a hard ⟨g⟩ is also common.

The double consonant ⟨gg⟩ has the value /ɡ/ (hard ⟨g⟩) as in nugget, with very few exceptions: /d͡ʒ/ in exaggerate and veggies and dialectally /ɡd͡ʒ/ in suggest.

The digraph ⟨dg⟩ (before ⟨e⟩, ⟨i⟩, ⟨y⟩, and consonants) has the value /d͡ʒ/ (soft ⟨g⟩), as in badger, bridging, fudgy, judg(e)ment. Non-digraph ⟨dg⟩ can also occur, in compounds like floodgate and headgear.

The digraph ⟨ng⟩ may represent:

- a velar nasal (/ŋ/) as in length, singer
- the latter followed by hard ⟨g⟩ (/ŋɡ/) as in jungle, finger, longest

Non-digraph ⟨ng⟩ also occurs, with possible values

- /nɡ/ as in engulf, ungainly
- /nd͡ʒ/ as in sponge, angel
- /nʒ/ as in melange

The digraph ⟨gh⟩ (in many cases a replacement for the obsolete letter yogh, which took various values including /ɡ/, /ɣ/, /x/ and /j/) may represent:

- /ɡ/ as in ghost, aghast, burgher, spaghetti
- /f/ as in cough, laugh, roughage
- ∅ (no sound) as in through, neighbor, night
- /x/ in ugh
- (rarely) /p/ in hiccough
- (rarely) /k/ in s'ghetti

Non-digraph ⟨gh⟩ also occurs, in compounds like foghorn, pigheaded.

The digraph ⟨gn⟩ may represent:

- /n/ as in gnostic, deign, foreigner, signage
- /nj/ in loanwords like champignon, lasagna

Non-digraph ⟨gn⟩ also occurs, as in signature, agnostic.

The trigraph ⟨ngh⟩ has the value /ŋ/ as in gingham or dinghy. Non-trigraph ⟨ngh⟩ also occurs, in compounds like stronghold and dunghill.

G is the tenth least frequently used letter in the English language (after Y, P, B, V, K, J, X, Q, and Z), with a frequency of about 2.02% in words.

=== Other languages ===
Most Romance languages and some Scandinavian languages also have two main pronunciations for ⟨g⟩, hard and soft. While the soft value of ⟨g⟩ varies in different Romance languages (/ʒ/ in French and Portuguese, [(d)ʒ] in Catalan, /d͡ʒ/ in Italian and Romanian, and /x/ in most dialects of Spanish), in all except Romanian and Italian, soft ⟨g⟩ has the same pronunciation as the ⟨j⟩.

In Italian and Romanian, ⟨gh⟩ is used to represent /ɡ/ before front vowels where ⟨g⟩ would otherwise represent a soft value. In Italian and French, ⟨gn⟩ is used to represent the palatal nasal /ɲ/, a sound somewhat similar to the ⟨ny⟩ in English canyon. In Italian, the trigraph ⟨gli⟩, when appearing before a vowel or as the article and pronoun gli, represents the palatal lateral approximant /ʎ/. Other languages typically use ⟨g⟩ to represent /ɡ/, regardless of position.

Amongst European languages, Czech, Dutch, Estonian and Finnish are exceptions, as they do not have /ɡ/ in their native words. In Dutch, ⟨g⟩ represents a voiced velar fricative /ɣ/ instead, a sound that does not occur in modern English, but there is a dialectal variation: many Netherlandic dialects use a voiceless fricative ([x] or [χ]) instead, and in southern dialects it may be palatal [ʝ]. Nevertheless, word-finally, it is always voiceless in all dialects, including the standard Dutch of Belgium and the Netherlands. On the other hand, some dialects (like Amelands) may have a phonemic /ɡ/.

Faroese uses ⟨g⟩ to represent /dʒ/, in addition to /ɡ/, and also uses it to indicate a glide.

In Māori, ⟨g⟩ is used in the digraph ⟨ng⟩ which represents the velar nasal /ŋ/ and is pronounced like the ⟨ng⟩ in singer.

The Samoan and Fijian languages use the letter ⟨g⟩ by itself for /ŋ/.

In older Czech and Slovak orthographies, ⟨g⟩ was used to represent /j/, while /ɡ/ was written as ⟨ǧ⟩ (U+01E7 ǧ LATIN SMALL LETTER G WITH CARON).

The Azerbaijani Latin alphabet uses ⟨g⟩ exclusively for the "soft" sound, namely /ɟ/. The sound /ɡ/ is written as ⟨q⟩. This leads to unusual spellings of loanwords: qram 'gram', qrup 'group', qaraj 'garage', qallium 'gallium'.

=== Other systems ===
In the International Phonetic Alphabet, ⟨ɡ⟩ represents the voiced velar plosive. The small caps ⟨ɢ⟩ represents the voiced uvular plosive.

== Other uses ==
The letter G or g is used as an abbreviation in many fields – see G (disambiguation) for a comprehensive list of relevant articles.

== Related characters ==
=== Ancestors, descendants and siblings ===
- 𐤂 : Semitic letter Gimel, from which the following symbols originally derive
- C c : Latin letter C, from which G derives
- Γ γ : Greek letter Gamma, from which C derives in turn
- ɡ : Latin letter script small G
- ᶢ : Modifier letter small script g is used for phonetic transcription
- 𝼁 : Latin small letter reversed script g, an extension to IPA for disordered speech (extIPA)
- ᵷ : Turned g
- 𝼂 : Latin letter small capital turned g, an extension to IPA for disordered speech (extIPA)
- Г г : Cyrillic letter Ge
- Ȝ ȝ : Latin letter Yogh
- Ɣ ɣ : Latin letter Gamma
- Ᵹ ᵹ : Insular g
- ᫌ : Combining insular g, used in the Ormulum
- Ꝿ ꝿ : Turned insular g
- Ꟑ ꟑ : Closed insular g, used in the Ormulum
- ɢ : Latin letter small capital G, used in the International Phonetic Alphabet to represent a voiced uvular stop
- 𐞒 : Modifier letter small capital G, used as a superscript IPA letter
- ʛ : Latin letter small capital G with hook, used in the International Phonetic Alphabet to represent a voiced uvular implosive
- 𐞔 : Modifier letter small capital G with hook, used as a superscript IPA letter
- 𐞓 : Modifier letter small g with hook, used as a superscript IPA letter
- ᴳ ᵍ: Modifier letters are used in the Uralic Phonetic Alphabet
- ꬶ : Used for the Teuthonista phonetic transcription system
- G with diacritics: Ǵ ǵ Ǥ ǥ Ĝ ĝ Ǧ ǧ Ğ ğ Ģ ģ Ɠ ɠ Ġ ġ Ḡ ḡ Ꞡ ꞡ ᶃ
- ց : Armenian alphabet Tso

=== Ligatures and abbreviations ===
- ₲ - Paraguayan guaraní
- ㎏ - the kilogram symbol as a single character in the CJK Compatibility block

== Other representations ==
=== Computing ===
The principal forms of the letter have codepoints in Unicode as listed below. The ASCII codes for G and g are the same as the Unicode codepoints:

- U+0047 G LATIN CAPITAL LETTER G
- U+0067 g LATIN SMALL LETTER G
- U+0261 ɡ LATIN SMALL LETTER SCRIPT G
- U+A7AC Ɡ LATIN CAPITAL LETTER SCRIPT G
- U+FF27 Ｇ FULLWIDTH LATIN CAPITAL LETTER G
- U+FF47 ｇ FULLWIDTH LATIN SMALL LETTER G

In addition, there are many forms of 'G with a diacritic', encoded either as a precomposed character or using a combining diacritic.

=== Other ===
NATO phonetic	Morse code
Golf	▄▄▄ ▄▄▄ ▄

Signal flag

Flag semaphore
American manual alphabet (ASL fingerspelling)
British manual alphabet (BSL fingerspelling)
Braille dots-1245
Unified English Braille

== See also ==
- Carolingian G
- Hard and soft G
- Latin letters used in mathematics § Gg
