= Ge with stroke =

Cyrillic letter used for /ɣ~ʁ/ in various languages

- Ғ ғ

Usage
- Writing system: Cyrillic
- Type: Alphabetic
- Sound values: [ʁ], [ɣ]

History
- Development: Ϝ, Γ: Ғ ғ

Ge with stroke (Ғ ғ, italics: Ғ ғ), or Ghayn, is a Cyrillic letter which represents the letter Г with a horizontal stroke. It is also used in the Bashkir, Kazakh Cyrillic and Uzbek Cyrillic alphabets where it represents a voiced uvular fricative /ʁ/. Despite having a similar shape, it is not related to the F of the Latin alphabet. In Kazakh, this letter may also represent the voiced velar fricative /ɣ/. In the Uzbek Latin alphabet, this letter corresponds to Gʻ (to be replaced by Ğ in April 2027).

The letter is also used to write Bashkir, Tajik, Karakalpak, Shor, Siberian Tatar, Nivkh, and Azerbaijani (in Russia), and was also formerly used in Azerbaijan. It is similar to the letter Ğ found in Turkish and Latin Azerbaijani alphabets.

== Usage ==
Language	Letter order	IPA	Notes
Alyutor	7	ɣ	
Azerbaijani	5	ɣ~ʁ	Replaced by Latin Ğ in Azerbaijan, still used in Dagestan
Bashkir	5	ɣ~ʁ	
Karakalpak	6	ɣ	Replaced by Ǵ in the Latin alphabet for Karakalpak.
Kazakh	6	ʁ	Replaced by Ğ in the Roman-based script
Khakas	5	ɣ	
Nivkh	6	ɣ	
Siberian Tatar	6	ɣ~ʁ	
Shor	5	ɣ	
Shughni	7	ʁ	Represented as Jh in the corresponding Latin alphabet
Tajik	5	ɣ~ʁ	Represented as Ƣ
Uyghur	6	ɣ~ʁ	Equivalent to غ in the UEY, Gh in the ULY, and Ƣ in the UYY.
Uzbek	34	ɣ~ʁ	Equivalent to Ğ in the Uzbek Latin alphabet
Yukaghir	6	ʁ	

== Computing codes ==
Character information
Preview	Ғ		ғ	
Unicode name	CYRILLIC CAPITAL LETTER GHE WITH STROKE		CYRILLIC SMALL LETTER GHE WITH STROKE	
Encodings	decimal	hex	dec	hex
Unicode	1170	U+0492	1171	U+0493
UTF-8	210 146	D2 92	210 147	D2 93
Numeric character reference	&#1170;	&#x492;	&#1171;	&#x493;

== See also ==
- Ge
- Kazakh language
- Uzbek language
- Azerbaijani language
- Bashkir language
- Karakalpak language
- Siberian Tatar language
- Tajik language
- Ƣ ƣ: Latin letter Gha
- Ğ ğ: Latin letter G with breve
- Ayin
- Gʻ gʻ: Latin letter G with turned comma above right
- Ge with middle hook
- Ge with stroke and hook
