= Ge (Cyrillic) =

Letter of the Cyrillic script

Ge/He (глаголи)
- Г г

Usage
- Writing system: Cyrillic
- Type: Alphabetic
- Language of origin: Old Church Slavonic
- Sound values: [ɡ], [k], [v], [ɦ~ʕ], [ɣ], [h]
- In Unicode: U+0413, U+0433
- Alphabetical position: 4

History
Development
T14
      - Γ γ
        - Г г
- Descendants: Ґ ґ
- Transliterations: G g, H h

Other
- Associated numbers: 3 (Cyrillic numerals)

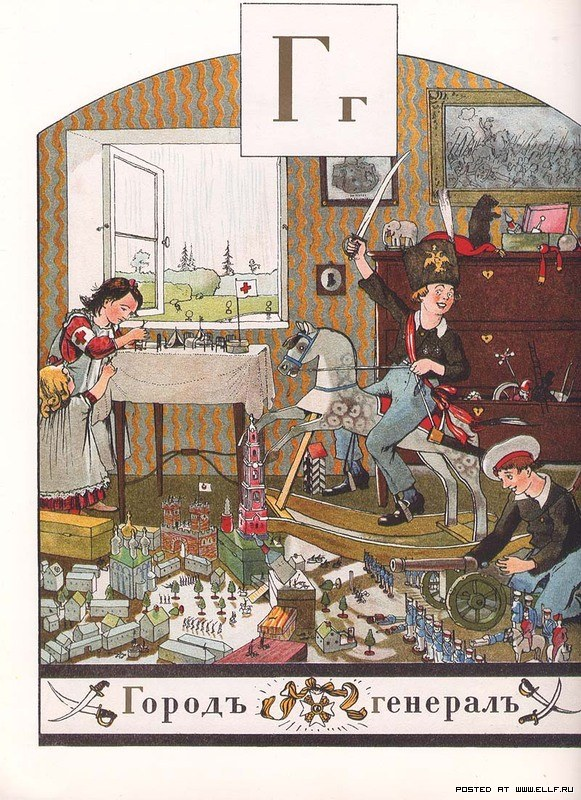
Ge, from Alexandre Benois' 1904 alphabet book

Ge, ghe, or he (Г г; italics: Г г or Г г; italics: Г г) is a letter of the Cyrillic script. Most commonly, it represents the voiced velar plosive /ɡ/, like the ⟨g⟩ in gift, or the voiced glottal fricative [ɦ], like the ⟨h⟩ in behind. It is generally romanized using the Latin letter g or h, depending on the source language.

== History ==
The Cyrillic letter ge was derived directly from the Greek letter Gamma (Γ) in uncial script.

In the Early Cyrillic alphabet, its name was глаголь (glagol' ), meaning "speak".

In the Cyrillic numeral system, it had a numerical value of 3.

== Usage ==
=== Slavic languages ===
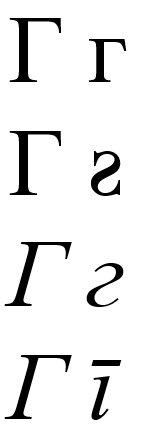
Г in: Russian/Serbian normal font; Bulgarian Cyrillic; Russian/Bulgarian italic; Serbian italic

==== Belarusian, Rusyn, and Ukrainian ====
From these three languages, the letter is romanized with h. Its name is he in Belarusian and Ukrainian, and hy in Rusyn.

In Belarusian (like in Southern Russian), the letter corresponds to the velar fricative /ɣ/ and its soft counterpart /ɣʲ/.

In Ukrainian and Rusyn, it represents a voiced glottal fricative [ɦ], a breathy voiced counterpart of the English [h].

In Ukrainian and Rusyn, a voiced velar plosive /ɡ/ is written with the Cyrillic letter ghe with upturn (Ґ ґ). In Belarusian, the official orthography uses г for both /ɣ/ and /ɡ/ (which is rare), although in Taraškievica ghe with upturn is optionally used for /ɡ/. Ґ is transliterated with G.

In all three languages' historical ancestor Ruthenian, the sound /ɡ/ was also represented by the digraph кг.

==== Russian ====
In standard Russian, ghe represents the voiced velar plosive /ɡ/ but is devoiced to [k] word-finally or before a voiceless consonant. It represents /ɡʲ/ before a palatalizing vowel. In the Southern Russian dialect, the sound becomes the velar fricative /ɣ/. Sometimes, the sound is the glottal fricative /ɦ/ in the regions bordering Belarus and Ukraine.

It is acceptable, for some people, to pronounce certain Russian words with [ɣ] (sometimes referred to as Ukrainian Ge): Бог, богатый, благо, Господь (Bog, bogatyj, blago, Gospod’). The sound is normally considered nonstandard or dialectal in Russian and is avoided by educated Russian speakers. Бог (Bog, "God") is always pronounced [box] in the nominative case.

In the Russian nominal genitive ending -ого, -его, ghe represents [v], including in the word сегодня ("today", from сего дня).

It represents a voiceless [x] (not [k]) in front of ka in two Russian words, namely, мягкий and лёгкий, and their derivatives.

The Latin letter h of words of Latin, Greek, English or German origin is usually transliterated into Russian with ghe rather than kha: hero → герой, hamburger → гамбургер, Haydn → Гайдн. That can occasionally cause ambiguity, as for example English Harry and Gary/Garry would be spelled the same in Russian, e.g. Гарри Поттер). The reasons for using ghe to write h include the fact that ghe is used for h in Ukrainian, Belarusian and some Russian dialects, along with the perception that kha sounds too harsh. Nevertheless, in newer loanwords (especially from English), kha has supplanted ghe, e.g. "hit" → Хит.

==== South Slavic ====
In standard Serbian, Bosnian, Montenegrin, Bulgarian and Macedonian the letter ghe represents a voiced velar plosive /ɡ/. In Bulgarian and Macedonian, it is also devoiced to [k] word-finally or before a voiceless consonant.

=== Usage in non-Slavic languages ===
In many non-Slavic languages it can represent both /ɡ/ and /ʁ~ɣ/ (the latter mostly in Turkic and some Finno-Ugric languages).

In Ossetian, an Indo-Iranian language spoken in the Caucasus, ⟨г⟩ represents the voiced velar stop /ɡ/. However, the digraph ⟨гъ⟩ represents the voiced uvular fricative /ʁ/.

== Cultural references ==
In the Russian Empire, the name of the letter glagol' was an informal reference to the Γ-shaped gallows:

Кругом пустыня, дичь и голь,
А в стороне торчит глаголь,
И на глаголе том два тела
Висят. Закаркав, отлетела
Ватага чёрная ворон,...
[All around there is desert, wilderness and bareness... And a glagol' sticks out on the side, And on that glagol' two bodies hang. The gang of black crows croaked and flew off..]

Alexander Pushkin, 1836

== Related letters and other similar characters ==
- Γ γ: Greek letter Gamma
- G g: Latin letter G
- H h: Latin letter H, romanized as in Belarusian, Ukrainian, and Rusyn
- Z z: Latin letter Z, alternative form of italicized Cyrillic Г (ge)
- Ґ ґ: Cyrillic letter ghe with upturn, the letter g, named ge in Ukrainian
- Ѓ ѓ: Cyrillic letter Gje
- Ғ ғ: Cyrillic letter Ghayn
- R r: Latin letter R (lowercase)
- ₴: Ukrainian hryvnia (Currency sign)
- Г̇ г̇: Ge with dot above, used by Nikolai Katanov to transliterate the Arabic letter ghayn (غ).

== Computing codes ==
Character information
Preview	Г		г	
Unicode name	CYRILLIC CAPITAL LETTER GHE		CYRILLIC SMALL LETTER GHE	
Encodings	decimal	hex	dec	hex
Unicode	1043	U+0413	1075	U+0433
UTF-8	208 147	D0 93	208 179	D0 B3
Numeric character reference	&#1043;	&#x413;	&#1075;	&#x433;
Named character reference	&Gcy;		&gcy;	
KOI8-R and KOI8-U	231	E7	199	C7
CP 855	173	AD	172	AC
Windows-1251	195	C3	227	E3
ISO-8859-5	179	B3	211	D3
Mac Cyrillic	131	83	227	E3
