= Uyghur alphabets =

Scripts used to write the Uyghur language

Uyghur is a Turkic language with a long literary tradition spoken in Xinjiang, China by the Uyghurs. Today, the Uyghur Arabic alphabet is the official writing system used for Uyghur in Xinjiang, whereas other alphabets like the Uyghur Cyrillic alphabets are still in use outside China, especially in Central Asia, and Uyghur Latin is used in western countries.

== History ==
=== Old Uyghur and Modern Uyghur ===
The Old Uyghur language and Modern Uyghur are distinct Turkic languages and are not different stages of the same language. The Old Uyghur language is ancestral to Western Yugur, while modern Uyghur is descended from one of the Karluk languages.

=== Old Uyghur alphabets ===
==== 5th to 18th century ====
In the 5th century Old Uyghur was written for the first time using the Sogdian alphabet. This fell out of use during the 10th century, when it evolved into the Old Uyghur alphabet, although it was taken into use again between the 15th and 16th century. While the Sogdian alphabet was still in use, it was written with the Old Turkic alphabet from the 6th-9th centuries.

The Old Uyghur language evolved into the modern Western Yugur, and remained in use until the 18th century among the Yugur.

=== Modern Uyghur alphabets ===
==== 10th century to 19th century ====
An Arabic alphabet introduced along with Islam in the 10th century to the Karluk Kara Khanids, which evolved into the modern day Uyghur Arabic alphabet.

The Arabic-derived alphabet taken into use first came to be the so-called Chagatai script, which was used for writing the Chagatai language and the Turki (modern Uyghur) language, but fell out of use in the early 1920s, when the Uyghur-speaking areas variously became a part of, or under the influence of, the Soviet Union.

The Chagatai alphabet is known as Kona Yëziq (Uyghur: كونا يېزىق, lit. 'old script').

The Syriac alphabet has also been used for writing Old Uyghur at some time between the 5th century and 19th century.

==== 20th to 21st century ====
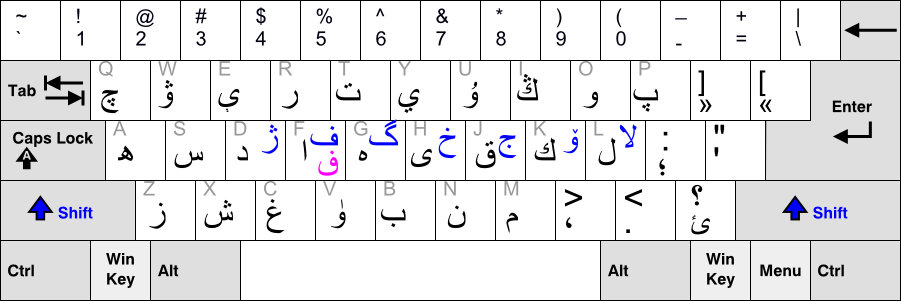
Microsoft Windows Uyghur keyboard layout. Note that vowels are still using the older abjad from the Arabic script, and not the newer plain letters for vowels of the Uyghur Arabic alphabet (composed of pairs of Arabic letters, starting by an alef with hamza, that must be entered separately on this keyboard before the actual vowel). In fact, the keyboard is also based on the older Latin alphabet used for the mixed Uyghur New Script and does not allow entering all vowels correctly for the current Arabic alphabet.

The writing of Uyghur saw many changes during the 20th century mostly to do with political decisions, both from the Soviet and Chinese side. The Soviet Union first tried to romanize the writing of the language, but soon after decided to promote a Cyrillic script during the late 1920s known as the Uyghur Cyrillic alphabet, fearing that a romanization of the language would strengthen the relationship of the Uyghurs with other Turkic peoples.

With the establishment of the People's Republic of China in 1949, the promotion of a Cyrillic script began, but when the tensions between the Soviet Union and China grew during the late 1950s, the Chinese devised a new alphabet based upon Pinyin and Cyrillic (with some letters borrowed from the Soviet's Uniform Turkic Alphabet – a Cyrillic-influenced Latin alphabet, with Latin letters like Ə, Ƣ, Ⱨ, Ɵ, etc.), which is known as the Uyghur New Script and promoted this instead, and which soon became the official alphabet of usage for almost 10 years.

In 1982 Uyghur new script was ditched, the Arabic alphabet was reinstated in a modified form as the Uyghur Arabic alphabet. However, due to the increasing importance of information technology, there have been requests for a Latin alphabet, for easier use on computers. This resulted in five conferences between 2000 and 2001, where a Latin-derived auxiliary alphabet was devised known as the Uyghur Latin alphabet.

== Present situation ==
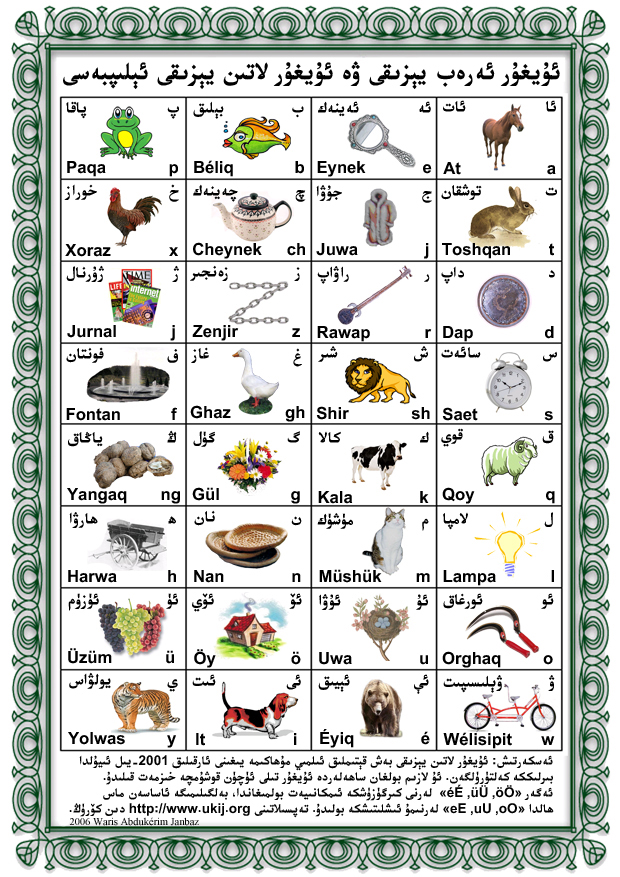
Comparative current alphabets: Arabic-Script Uyghur, Latin-Script Uyghur; Uyghur Ereb Yëziqi we Uyghur Latin alphabet sëlishturma ëlipbesi.

Today, the Uyghur language is written using five different alphabets, which are:

- UEY: the Uyghur Arabic alphabet, the only official alphabet in the Xinjiang province of China and is widely used in government, social media and in everyday life;
- UKY: the Uyghur Cyrillic alphabet is mostly used by Uyghurs living in Central Asian countries, especially in Kazakhstan;
- ALA-LC Uighur: the slightly-revised version dating from 2015 of the Romanized Uighur transliteration of the Library of Congress and the American Library Association is the standard used by WorldCat (a union-catalog that itemizes the collections of tens of thousands of institutions, mostly libraries, in many countries, that are current or past members of the OCLC global cooperative) and also has variants that make typing of it on computer easier (such as that of De Jong, Frederick. A Grammar of Modern Uyghur. Utrecht: Houtsma, 2007, who substitutes for its ă, ö, ü, and v respectively ae, oe, ue, and w, these being options suggested by German);
- ULY: the Uyghur Latin alphabet differs from the preceding in a few details and was introduced in 2008 and to be used solely in computer-related fields as an ancillary writing system, but has now largely fallen into disuse after the expanded availability of UEY keyboards and keypads on all devices.
- UYY: the mixed Uyghur New Script (also called Pinyin Yeziⱪi or UPNY), this alphabet is also Latin-based, but now most people who want to type in Latin use ULY instead.

In the table below, the alphabets are shown side-by-side for comparison, together with phonetic transcription in the International Phonetic Alphabet. It is only grouped by phonemic proximity; each alphabet has its own sorting order. Some letter forms that are used for words borrowed from other languages (notably proper names), or kept occasionally from older orthographic conventions, are shown in parentheses.

Consonants
IPA	UEY	UKY	UYY	ALA-LC	ULY
[m]	م	М м	M m		
[n]	ن	Н н	N n		
[d̥]~[d]	د	Д д	D d		
[tʰ]~[t]	ت	Т т	T t		
[b̥]~[b]	ب	Б б	B b		
[pʰ]~[p]	پ	П п	P p		
[f]	ف	Ф ф	F f		
[qʰ]~[q]	ق	Қ қ	Ⱪ ⱪ	Q q	
[cʰ]~[c]	ك	К к	K k		
[ŋ]	ڭ	Ң ң	Ng ng		
[ɟ̊]~[ɟ]	گ	Г г	G g		
[ʁ]	غ	Ғ ғ	Ƣ ƣ	Gh gh	
[ɦ]	ھ	Һ һ	Ⱨ ⱨ	H h	
[χ]	خ	Х х	H h	Kh kh	X x
[t͡ʃʰ]~[t͡ʃ]	چ	Ч ч	Q q	Ch ch	
[t͡ʃʰ]~[t͡ʃ]	چ	Ч ч	Ch ch	Ch ch	
[d̥͡ʒ]~[d͡ʒ]	ج	Җ җ	J j	J j	
[d̥͡ʒ]~[d͡ʒ]	ج	Җ җ	Zh zh	J j	
[ʒ]	ژ	Ж ж	Ⱬ ⱬ	Zh zh	
[z]	ز	З з	Z z		
[s]	س	С с	S s		
[ʃ]	ش	Ш ш	X x	Sh sh	
[ʃ]	ش	Ш ш	Sh sh	Sh sh	
[ɾ]~[ɹ̠]	ر	Р р	R r		
[l]~[ɫ]	ل	Л л	L l		

Vowels
IPA	UEY	UKY	UYY	ALA-LC	ULY
[ɑ]~[a]	ئا	А а	A a		
[æ]~[ɛ]	ئە	Ә ә	Ə ə	Ă ă	E e
[e]~[i]	ئې	Е е	E e		Ë ë
[i]~[ɨ]	ئى	И и	I i		
[ɵ]~[ø]	ئۆ	Ө ө	Ɵ ɵ	Ö ö	
[o]	ئو	О о	O o		
[u]	ئۇ	У у	U u		
[ʉ]~[y]	ئۈ	Ү ү	Ü ü		

Semivowels
IPA	UEY	UKY	UYY	ALA-LC	ULY
[j]	ي	Й й	Y y		
[v]~[w]	ۋ	В в	V v		W w

Compounds from Cyrillic
IPA	UEY	UKY	ALA-LC	UYY	ULY
/ju/	ي‍‍ۇ	Ю ю	Yu yu		
/jɑ/~/ja/	ي‍‍ا	Я я	Ya ya		

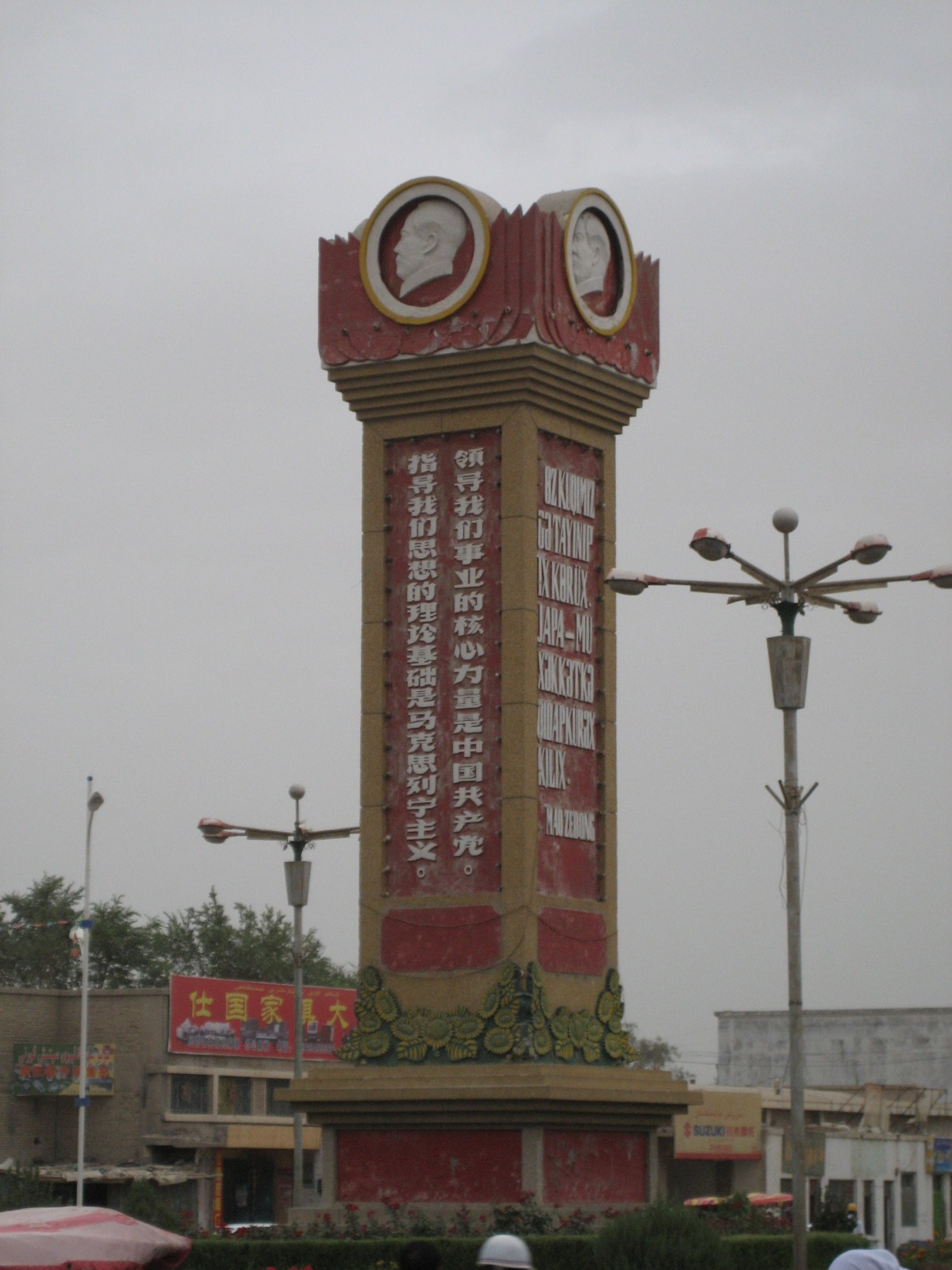
A monument in Niya (Minfeng) with inscriptions in Chinese and Romanized Uyghur

As can be seen, the Uyghur Arabic alphabet, Uyghur New Script, ALA-LC Uighur Romanization, and Uyghur Latin alphabet each has a total of 32 letters (if one included their digraphs, which are: ⟨ng⟩ in all three Latin-based alphabets; also ⟨ch⟩, ⟨gh⟩, ⟨sh⟩, & ⟨zh⟩ in ULY and ALA-CL, and in this last further ⟨kh⟩, as well as their vowels bearing diacritics). Differences may still exist in texts using ULY (the most recently devised of the Latin orthographies) in that its standard ⟨ë⟩ is sometimes written by instead ⟨é⟩, that is to say, with the acute accent in place of the diaeresis, without this variation denoting any difference in Uyghur pronunciation.

The Uyghur Cyrillic alphabet has three additional letters, the Cyrillic soft letters/ligatures ⟨ё⟩, ⟨ю⟩, and ⟨я⟩, representing /jo/, /ju/, and /ja/, respectively, which are written with an independent consonant and vowel in the other alphabets. Some words may still use the Cyrillic soft sign. Also, loanwords of Russian origin are often spelled as they are in Russian, and thus not adapted to Uyghur orthography.

Another notable feature of the Uyghur New Script is the use of the letter ⟨ƣ⟩ to represent /ʁ/ (sometimes incorrectly rendered as /ɣ/). This letter has erroneously been named LATIN LETTER OI in Unicode, although it is correctly referred to as gha and replaced by the digraph ⟨gh⟩ in the newer Uyghur Latin alphabet.

In the ALA-LC Uighur Romanization and the Uyghur Latin alphabet, only the ISO basic Latin alphabet is needed plus in the way of diacritic marks that occur above vowels (which are supported by many fonts and encoding standards) only: in both spellings diaeresis (umlaut) and in the ALA-LC breve as well. The letter ⟨c⟩ is only used in the ⟨ch⟩ digraph, and the letter ⟨v⟩ is normally not used in the Uyghur Latin except in loanwords, where a difference exists between foreign /v/ and native /w/. Another detail of the Uyghur Latin is that /ʒ/ may be interchangeably represented by either of two letter: either using ⟨zh⟩ or as ⟨j⟩ — although the latter is also used for /dʒ/ (and, when the ⟨j⟩ thus becomes ambiguous by serving also in place of the ⟨zh⟩, speakers can still resolve the ambiguity from facts such as that the /ʒ/ tends to occur in words from Russian vs. the /dʒ/ in ones from Perso-Tajik, Arabic, and Mandarin). One might view this ⟨zh⟩ in the Arabic-script and Cyrillic orthographies as merely as a graphic variant of the ⟨j⟩, effectively reducing the number of letters in these two alphabets from 32 to 31. Users have found this variation in spelling acceptable as long as it does not obscure any semantic distinction.

One of the major differences among the four alphabets is the rules of when the glottal stop /ʔ/ is written.

In Uyghur Arabic alphabet, it is consistently written, using the hamza on a tooth ⟨ﺋ⟩, including at the beginning of words. However, in that position, the glottal stop is not considered by Uyghurs a separate letter, but rather to be just a support for the vowel that follow.

In the Uyghur Cyrillic alphabet and Uyghur New Script, the glottal stop was only written word-medially, using an apostrophe (⟨’⟩), but it is not required and thus not very consistent.

And finally, in the ALA-LC Uighur Romanization and the Uyghur Latin alphabet, the glottal stop is written between consonants and vowels (likewise using an apostrophe, but consistently), and also to separate ⟨gh⟩, ⟨kh⟩, ⟨ng⟩, ⟨sh⟩, and ⟨zh⟩ when these represent two phonemes rather than being digraphs for a single consonant (for example the word bashlan’ghuch, pronounced [bɑʃlɑnʁutʃ] and meaning beginning, which could have been [bɑʃlɑŋɦutʃ] without the apostrophe).

== Example ==
Below is the same text in Uyghur, but written using each of the four alphabets in common use today.

The text is taken from the first article of the Universal Declaration of Human Rights.

Uyghur Arabic (UEY)	ھەممە ئادەم تۇغۇلۇشىدىنلا ئەركىن، ئىززەت۔ھۆرمەت ۋە ھوقۇقتا باب۔باراۋەر بولۇپ تۇغۇلغان. ئۇلار ئەقىلگە ۋە ۋىجدانغا ئىگە ھەمدە بىر۔بىرىگە قېرىنداشلىق مۇناسىۋىتىگە خاس روھ بىلەن مۇئامىلە قىلىشى كېرەك.
Uyghur Cyrillic (UKY)	Һәммә адәм туғулушидинла әркин, иззәт-һөрмәт вә һоқуқта баббаравәр болуп туғулған. Улар әқилгә вә виҗданға игә һәмдә бир-биригә қериндашлиқ мунасивитигә хас роһ билән муамилә қилиши керәк.
Former Pinyin-based (UYY)	Ⱨəmmə adəm tuƣuluxidinla ərkin, izzət-ⱨɵrmət wə ⱨoⱪuⱪta bab-barawər bolup tuƣulƣan. Ular əⱪilgə wə wijdanƣa igə ⱨəmdə bir-birigə ⱪerindaxliⱪ munasiwitigə has roⱨ bilən mu’amilə ⱪilixi kerək.
ALA-LC Romanization for Uighur	Hămmă adăm tughulushidinla ărkin, izzăt-hörmăt vă hoquqta bab-baravăr bolup tughulghan. Ular ăqilgă vă vijdan'gha igă hămdă bir-birigă qerindashliq munasivitigă khas roh bilăn muamilă qilishi kerăk.
Uyghur Latin (ULY)	Hemme adem tughulushidinla erkin, izzet-hörmet we hoquqta babbarawer bolup tughulghan. Ular eqilge we wijdan'gha ige hemde bir-birige qërindashliq munasiwitige xas roh bilen muamile qilishi kërek.
English	All human beings are born free and equal in dignity and rights. They are endowed with reason and conscience and should act towards one another in a spirit of brotherhood.
