= Uyghur Latin alphabet =

Latin-based alphabet for the Uyghur language

Uyghur name
- Uyghur: ئۇيغۇر لاتىن يېزىقى
Transcriptions
- Latin Yëziqi: Uyghur Latin Yëziqi
- Siril Yëziqi: Уйғур Латин Йезиқи

Chinese name
- Simplified Chinese: 拉丁维文
- Traditional Chinese: 拉丁維文
Transcriptions
Standard Mandarin
- Hanyu Pinyin: Lādīng Wéiwén

Russian name
- Russian: Уйгурский латинский алфавит

The Uyghur Latin alphabet (Uyghur: ئۇيغۇر لاتىن يېزىقى, romanized: Uyghur Latin Yëziqi, ULY) is an auxiliary alphabet for the Uyghur language based on the Latin script. Uyghur is primarily written in Uyghur Arabic alphabet and sometimes in Uyghur Cyrillic alphabet.

In 2023, the alphabet was agreed as the BGN/PCGN romanization system for Uyghur.

== Construction ==
The Uyghur Latin alphabet was first introduced in the 1930s in the former Soviet Union and was briefly used in the Uyghur Autonomous Region during the 1960s to 1970s. The ULY project was finalized at Xinjiang University, Ürümqi, Xinjiang Uyghur Autonomous Region (XUAR), People's Republic of China in July 2001, at the fifth conference of a series held there for that purpose that started in November 2000. In January 2008, the ULY project was amended and identified by Xinjiang Uyghur Autonomous Regional Working Committee of Minorities' Language and Writing.

The letters in the Uyghur Latin alphabet are, in order:

Majuscule	Minuscule	IPA
A	a	ɑ, a
E	e	ɛ, æ
B	b	b
P	p	p
T	t	t
J	j	d͡ʒ
CH	ch	t͡ʃ
X	x	χ, x
D	d	d
R	r	r, ɾ
Z	z	z
ZH	zh	ʒ
S	s	s
SH	sh	ʃ
GH	gh	ʁ, ɣ
F	f	f, ɸ
Q	q	q
K	k	k
G	g	ɡ
NG	ng	ŋ
L	l	l
M	m	m
N	n	n
H	h	h, ɦ
O	o	o, ɔ
U	u	u, ʊ
Ö	ö	ø
Ü	ü	y, ʏ
W	w	w, v
Ë	ë	e, ɤ
I	i	i, ɪ; ɨ, ɯ
Y	y	j

== Purpose ==
The creators of the Uyghur Latin alphabet strongly emphasized that “the proposed alphabet should not replace [the Persian-Arab Uyghur alphabet] nor should its introduction represent a new reform of the writing system. It is to be used solely in computer-related fields as an ancillary writing system.”

== Public reception ==
The Uyghur Latin alphabet had a heavy public relations presence on both the Internet and official Xinjiang Uyghur Autonomous Region media but despite official efforts to play down the sense of a massive reform, the Uyghur Latin alphabet has acquired that connotation and the public seems wary of it. The importance of having one-to-one correspondence between Latin and Arabic is noteworthy.

== Comparison of orthographies ==
The different orthographies are compared in the following table.

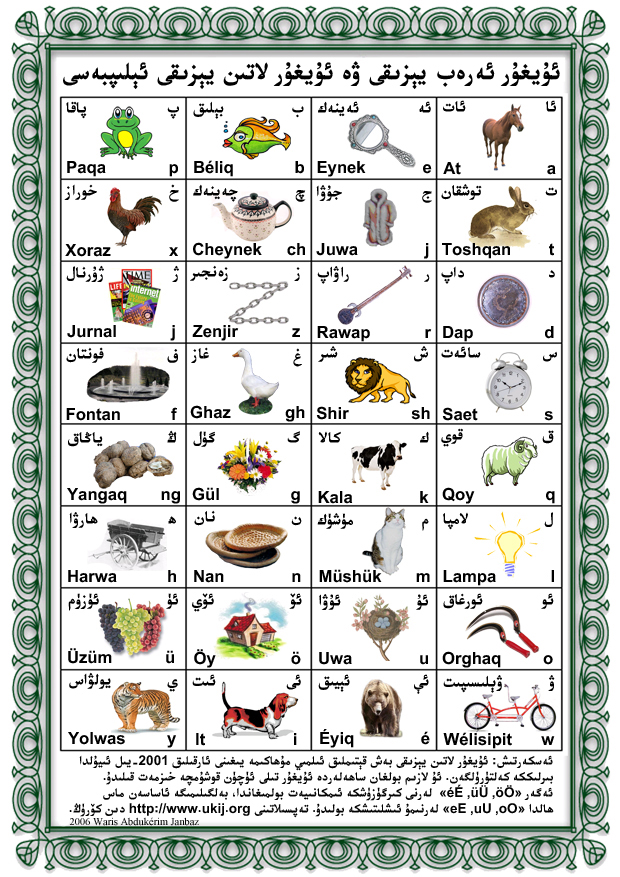
Comparative alphabets: Arabic-Script Uyghur, Latin-Script Uyghur

Order	UEY	ULY	USY	UYY	IPA
01	ئا	A a	А а	A a	/ɑ/
02	ئە	E e	Ә ә	Ə ə	/ɛ/~/æ/
03	ب	B b	Б б	B b	/b/
04	پ	P p	П п	P p	/p/
05	ت	T t	Т т	T t	/t/
06	ج	J j (Note: Before the 2008 revision, could be confounded with j used for /ʒ/, which is now only written zh.)	Җ җ	J j	/d͡ʒ/
07	چ	Ch ch	Ч ч	Q q	/t͡ʃ/
08	خ	X x	Х х	H h	/χ/
09	د	D d	Д д	D d	/d/
10	ر	R r	Р р	R r	/r/
11	ز	Z z	З з	Z z	/z/
12	ژ	Zh zh (Note: Before the 2008 revision, j could be used as well.)	Ж ж	Ⱬ ⱬ	/ʒ/
13	س	S s	С с	S s	/s/
14	ش	Sh sh	Ш ш	X x	/ʃ/
15	غ	Gh gh	Ғ ғ	Ƣ ƣ	/ʁ/
16	ف	F f	Ф ф	F f	/f/
17	ق	Q q	Қ қ	Ⱪ ⱪ	/q/
18	ك	K k	К к	K k	/k/
19	گ	G g	Г г	G g	/ɡ/
20	ڭ	Ng ng	Ң ң	Ng ng	/ŋ/
21	ل	L l	Л л	L l	/l/
22	م	M m	М м	M m	/m/
23	ن	N n	Н н	N n	/n/
24	ھ	H h	Һ һ	Ⱨ ⱨ	/h/
25	ئو	O o	О о	O o	/o/
26	ئۇ	U u	У у	U u	/u/
27	ئۆ	Ö ö	Ө ө	Ɵ ɵ	/ø/
28	ئۈ	Ü ü	Ү ү	Ü ü	/y/
29	ۋ	W w	В в	W w/V v	/w/~/v/
30	ئې	Ë ë (Note: Before the 2008 revision, É/é was used.)	Е е	E e	/e/
31	ئى	I i	И и	I i	/i/~/ɪ/
32	ي	Y y	Й й	Y y	/j/

== Text example ==
Below follows an example of the Universal Declaration of Human Rights (Article 1) in Uyghur:

Example of writing in various Uyghur orthographies
Arabic alphabet (UEY):	ھەممە ئادەم تۇغۇلۇشىدىنلا ئەركىن، ئىززەت-ھۆرمەت ۋە ھوقۇقتا بابباراۋەر بولۇپ تۇغۇلغان. ئۇلار ئەقىلگە ۋە ۋىجدانغا ئىگە ھەمدە بىر-بىرىگە قېرىنداشلىق مۇناسىۋىتىگە خاس روھ بىلەن مۇئامىلە قىلىشى كېرەك.
Cyrillic alphabet (USY):	Һәммә адәм туғулушидинла әркин, иззәт-һөрмәт вә һоқуқта баббаравәр болуп туғулған. Улар әқилгә вә виҗданға игә һәмдә бир-биригә қериндашлиқ мунасивитигә хас роһ билән муамилә қилиши керәк.
Former Pinyin-based alphabet (UYY):	Ⱨəmmə adəm tuƣuluxidinla ərkin, izzət-ⱨɵrmət wə ⱨoⱪuⱪta babbarawər bolup tuƣulƣan. Ular əⱪilgə wə wijdanƣa igə ⱨəmdə bir-birigə ⱪerindaxliⱪ munasiwitigə has roⱨ bilən mu’amilə ⱪilixi kerək.
Newer Latin alphabet (ULY):	Hemme adem tughulushidinla erkin, izzet-hörmet we hoquqta babbarawer bolup tughulghan. Ular eqilge we wijdan'gha ige hemde bir-birige qërindashliq munasiwitige xas roh bilen muamile qilishi kërek.
English:	All human beings are born free and equal in dignity and rights. They are endowed with reason and conscience and should act towards one another in a spirit of brotherhood.

== See also ==
- Uyghur Ereb Yëziqi
- Uyghur alphabets
