= Latin Extended-C =

- Range: U+2C60..U+2C7F (32 code points)
- Plane: BMP
- Scripts: Latin
- Major alphabets: Uighur; UPA
- Assigned: 32 code points
- Unused: 0 reserved code points

Unicode Version History
- 5.0 (2006): 17 (+17)
- 5.1 (2008): 29 (+12)
- 5.2 (2009): 32 (+3)

Unicode documentation
- Code chart ∣ Web page

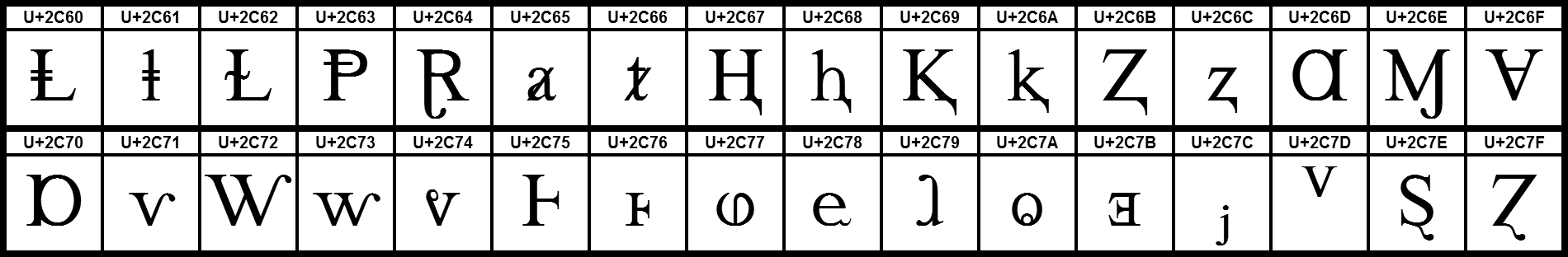
Graphical representation of the Latin Extended-C Unicode block

Latin Extended-C is a Unicode block containing Latin characters for Uighur New Script, the Uralic Phonetic Alphabet, Shona, Claudian Latin and the Swedish Dialect Alphabet.

== Block ==
Latin Extended-C^{[1]} Official Unicode Consortium code chart (PDF)
	0	1	2	3	4	5	6	7	8	9	A	B	C	D	E	F
U+2C6x	Ⱡ	ⱡ	Ɫ	Ᵽ	Ɽ	ⱥ	ⱦ	Ⱨ	ⱨ	Ⱪ	ⱪ	Ⱬ	ⱬ	Ɑ	Ɱ	Ɐ
U+2C7x	Ɒ	ⱱ	Ⱳ	ⱳ	ⱴ	Ⱶ	ⱶ	ⱷ	ⱸ	ⱹ	ⱺ	ⱻ	ⱼ	ⱽ	Ȿ	Ɀ
Notes 1.As of Unicode version 17.0

== History ==
The following Unicode-related documents record the purpose and process of defining specific characters in the Latin Extended-C block:

Version	Final code points (Note: Proposed code points and characters names may differ from final code points and names)	Count	L2 ID	WG2 ID	Document
5.0	U+2C60..2C64	5	L2/04-372R	N2847R	Priest, Lorna (2004-12-09), Proposal to Encode Additional Latin Orthographic Characters
5.0	U+2C65..2C66	2	L2/05-076		Davis, Mark (2005-02-10), Stability of Case Folding
5.0	U+2C65..2C66	2		N2942	Freytag, Asmus; Whistler, Ken (2005-08-12), Proposal to add nine lowercase characters
5.0	U+2C65..2C66	2	L2/05-108R		Moore, Lisa (2005-08-26), "Stability of Case Folding (B.14.2)", UTC #103 Minutes
5.0	U+2C65..2C66	2	L2/05-270		Whistler, Ken (2005-09-21), "C. Code points for already approved Latin characters", WG2 Consent Docket (Sophia Antipolis)
5.0	U+2C65..2C66	2	L2/05-279		Moore, Lisa (2005-11-10), "Consensus 105-C29", UTC #105 Minutes
5.0	U+2C65..2C66	2		N2953 (pdf, doc)	Umamaheswaran, V. S. (2006-02-16), "M47.5k, M47.5l", Unconfirmed minutes of WG 2 meeting 47, Sophia Antipolis, France; 2005-09-12/15
5.0	U+2C67..2C6C	6	L2/05-029R	N2931	Priest, Lorna (2005-01-28), Proposal to encode additional Latin orthographic characters for Uighur Latin Alphabet
5.0	U+2C67..2C6C	6	L2/05-026		Moore, Lisa (2005-05-16), "Latin Orthographic Characters for Uighur (C.2)", UTC #102 Minutes
5.0	U+2C67..2C6C	6	L2/05-263	N2992	Supporting references for N2931: Proposal to Encode Additional Latin Characters for Uighur and Kazak Latin Alphabet, 2005-09-21
5.0	U+2C67..2C6C	6	L2/05-270		Whistler, Ken (2005-09-21), "C. Code points for already approved Latin characters", WG2 Consent Docket (Sophia Antipolis)
5.0	U+2C67..2C6C	6	L2/05-279		Moore, Lisa (2005-11-10), "Consensus 105-C29", UTC #105 Minutes
5.0	U+2C67..2C6C	6		N2953 (pdf, doc)	Umamaheswaran, V. S. (2006-02-16), "7.2.7", Unconfirmed minutes of WG 2 meeting 47, Sophia Antipolis, France; 2005-09-12/15
5.0	U+2C74	1	L2/04-246R		Priest, Lorna (2004-07-26), Revised Proposal for Additional Latin Phonetic and Orthographic Characters
5.0	U+2C74	1	L2/04-316		Moore, Lisa (2004-08-19), "C.6", UTC #100 Minutes
5.0	U+2C74	1	L2/04-348	N2906	Priest, Lorna (2004-08-23), Revised Proposal for Additional Latin Phonetic and Orthographic Characters
5.0	U+2C74	1	L2/05-180		Moore, Lisa (2005-08-17), "C.16", UTC #104 Minutes
5.0	U+2C74	1		N2953 (pdf, doc)	Umamaheswaran, V. S. (2006-02-16), "M47.5a", Unconfirmed minutes of WG 2 meeting 47, Sophia Antipolis, France; 2005-09-12/15
5.0	U+2C75..2C76	2	L2/05-183	N2957	Everson, Michael; Haugen, Odd Einar; Emiliano, António; Pedro, Susana; Grammel, Florian; Baker, Peter; Stötzner, Andreas; Dohnicht, Marcus; Luft, Diana (2005-08-02), Preliminary proposal to add medievalist characters to the UCS
5.0	U+2C75..2C76	2	L2/05-191		Whistler, Ken (2005-08-02), Proposal for dealing with lowercase Claudian letters
5.0	U+2C75..2C76	2	L2/05-193R2	N2960R	Everson, Michael (2005-08-12), Proposal to add Claudian Latin letters to the UCS
5.0	U+2C75..2C76	2	L2/05-180		Moore, Lisa (2005-08-17), "Claudian (C.15)", UTC #104 Minutes
5.0	U+2C75..2C76	2		N2953 (pdf, doc)	Umamaheswaran, V. S. (2006-02-16), "7.4.6, 8.2.3", Unconfirmed minutes of WG 2 meeting 47, Sophia Antipolis, France; 2005-09-12/15
5.0	U+2C77	1	L2/05-189	N2958	Lehtiranta, Juhani; Ruppel, Klaas; Suutari, Toni; Trosterud, Trond (2005-07-22), Report on progress in implementing the Uralic Phonetic Alphabet with indication of the need for additional characters and symbols
5.0	U+2C77	1	L2/05-261	N2989	Ruppel, Klaas; Kolehmainen, Erkki I.; Everson, Michael; Freytag, Asmus; Whistler, Ken (2005-09-13), Proposal to add six additional Uralicist characters to the UCS
5.0	U+2C77	1	L2/05-270		Whistler, Ken (2005-09-21), "A. Uralicist character additions", WG2 Consent Docket (Sophia Antipolis)
5.0	U+2C77	1	L2/05-279		Moore, Lisa (2005-11-10), "Consensus 105-C29", UTC #105 Minutes
5.0	U+2C77	1		N2953 (pdf, doc)	Umamaheswaran, V. S. (2006-02-16), "7.4.7", Unconfirmed minutes of WG 2 meeting 47, Sophia Antipolis, France; 2005-09-12/15
5.1	U+2C6D..2C6E, 2C72..2C73	4		N2945	Priest, Lorna; Constable, Peter (2005-08-09), Proposal to Encode Additional Latin Phonetic and Orthographic Characters
5.1	U+2C6D..2C6E, 2C72..2C73	4		N2953 (pdf, doc)	Umamaheswaran, V. S. (2006-02-16), "7.2.8", Unconfirmed minutes of WG 2 meeting 47, Sophia Antipolis, France; 2005-09-12/15
5.1	U+2C6D..2C6E, 2C72..2C73	4		N3103 (pdf, doc)	Umamaheswaran, V. S. (2006-08-25), "M48.1", Unconfirmed minutes of WG 2 meeting 48, Mountain View, CA, USA; 2006-04-24/27
5.1	U+2C6F	1	L2/06-266	N3122	Everson, Michael (2006-08-06), Proposal to add Latin letters and a Greek symbol to the UCS
5.1	U+2C6F	1	L2/06-231		Moore, Lisa (2006-08-17), "C.16", UTC #108 Minutes
5.1	U+2C6F	1		N3153 (pdf, doc)	Umamaheswaran, V. S. (2007-02-16), "M49.3", Unconfirmed minutes of WG 2 meeting 49 AIST, Akihabara, Tokyo, Japan; 2006-09-25/29
5.1	U+2C71	1	L2/05-208		Constable, Peter; Esling, John (2005-08-02), Approval of new IPA sound: the labiodental flap
5.1	U+2C71	1		N2945	Priest, Lorna; Constable, Peter (2005-08-09), Proposal to Encode Additional Latin Phonetic and Orthographic Characters
5.1	U+2C71	1		N2953 (pdf, doc)	Umamaheswaran, V. S. (2006-02-16), "7.2.8", Unconfirmed minutes of WG 2 meeting 47, Sophia Antipolis, France; 2005-09-12/15
5.1	U+2C71	1		N3103 (pdf, doc)	Umamaheswaran, V. S. (2006-08-25), "M48.1", Unconfirmed minutes of WG 2 meeting 48, Mountain View, CA, USA; 2006-04-24/27
5.1	U+2C71	1	L2/18-324		Chan, Eiso (2018-11-02), Annotation additions for U+2C71
5.1	U+2C71	1	L2/19-047		Anderson, Deborah; et al. (2019-01-13), "1", Recommendations to UTC #158 January 2019 on Script Proposals
5.1	U+2C71	1	L2/19-008		Moore, Lisa (2019-02-08), "C.5.1 Annotation additions for U+2C71 LATIN SMALL LETTER V WITH HOOK", UTC #158 Minutes
5.1	U+2C78..2C7A	3	L2/06-036	N3031, N3031-1, N3031-2	Lemonen, Therese; Ruppel, Klaas; Kolehmainen, Erkki I.; Sandström, Caroline (2006-01-26), Proposal to encode characters for Ordbok över Finlands svenska folkmål in the UCS
5.1	U+2C78..2C7A	3	L2/06-008R2		Moore, Lisa (2006-02-13), "C.17", UTC #106 Minutes
5.1	U+2C78..2C7A	3	L2/06-108		Moore, Lisa (2006-05-25), "Consensus 107-C31", UTC #107 Minutes, "Accept the name change for U+2C7A LATIN SMALL LETTER O WITH LOW RING INSIDE."
5.1	U+2C78..2C7A	3		N3103 (pdf, doc)	Umamaheswaran, V. S. (2006-08-25), "M48.21", Unconfirmed minutes of WG 2 meeting 48, Mountain View, CA, USA; 2006-04-24/27
5.1	U+2C78..2C7A	3	L2/07-118R2		Moore, Lisa (2007-05-23), "111-C17", UTC #111 Minutes, "Approve 1 character name change: 2C78 LATIN SMALL LETTER E WITH NOTCH"
5.1	U+2C78..2C7A	3	L2/07-268	N3253 (pdf, doc)	Umamaheswaran, V. S. (2007-07-26), "M50.4b", Unconfirmed minutes of WG 2 meeting 50, Frankfurt-am-Main, Germany; 2007-04-24/27, "2C78 is renamed LATIN SMALL LETTER E WITH NOTCH"
5.1	U+2C7B..2C7D	3	L2/06-215	N3070	Ruppel, Klaas; Rueter, Jack; Kolehmainen, Erkki I. (2006-04-07), Proposal for Encoding 3 Additional Characters of the Uralic Phonetic Alphabet
5.1	U+2C7B..2C7D	3	L2/06-108		Moore, Lisa (2006-05-25), "Consensus 107-C45", UTC #107 Minutes
5.1	U+2C7B..2C7D	3		N3103 (pdf, doc)	Umamaheswaran, V. S. (2006-08-25), "M48.19", Unconfirmed minutes of WG 2 meeting 48, Mountain View, CA, USA; 2006-04-24/27
5.1	U+2C7B..2C7D	3	L2/11-043		Freytag, Asmus; Karlsson, Kent (2011-02-02), Proposal to correct mistakes and inconsistencies in certain property assignments for super and subscripted letters
5.1	U+2C7B..2C7D	3	L2/11-016		Moore, Lisa (2011-02-15), "Correct mistakes in property assignments for super and subscripted letters (B.13.4) [U+2C7C]", UTC #126 / L2 #223 Minutes
5.1	U+2C7B..2C7D	3	L2/11-160		PRI #181 Changing General Category of Twelve Characters, 2011-05-02
5.2	U+2C70	1	L2/07-334R2	N3447	Priest, Lorna (2007-10-15), Proposal to encode two phonetic characters and two Shona characters
5.2	U+2C70	1	L2/07-345		Moore, Lisa (2007-10-25), "C.4", UTC #113 Minutes
5.2	U+2C70	1	L2/08-318	N3453 (pdf, doc)	Umamaheswaran, V. S. (2008-08-13), "M52.20f", Unconfirmed minutes of WG 2 meeting 52
5.2	U+2C7E..2C7F	2	L2/03-190R		Constable, Peter (2003-06-08), Proposal to Encode Additional Phonetic Symbols in the UCS
5.2	U+2C7E..2C7F	2	L2/07-334R2	N3447	Priest, Lorna (2007-10-15), Proposal to encode two phonetic characters and two Shona characters
5.2	U+2C7E..2C7F	2	L2/07-345		Moore, Lisa (2007-10-25), "C.4", UTC #113 Minutes
5.2	U+2C7E..2C7F	2	L2/08-318	N3453 (pdf, doc)	Umamaheswaran, V. S. (2008-08-13), "M52.20f", Unconfirmed minutes of WG 2 meeting 52

== See also ==
- Phonetic symbols in Unicode
