= Uyghur language =

Karluk Turkic language

Uyghur
- Uighur
- ئۇيغۇرچە; Uyghurche; Уйғурчә; ئۇيغۇر تىلى; Uyghur tili; Уйғур тили
- "Uyghur" written in Perso-Arabic script
- Pronunciation: [ʊjʁʊ́rt͡ɕʰɛ] [ʊjʁʊ́r tʰɪlɪ́]
- Native to: China, Kazakhstan, Kyrgyzstan, Tajikistan
- Ethnicity: Uyghurs; Äynus; Akto Turkmens
- Native speakers: 8–13 million (2021)
- Language family: Turkic: Common Turkic; Karluk; Eastern Karluk; Uyghur
- Early forms: Karakhanid: Chagatai; Eastern Turki
- Standard forms: Standard Uyghur (Xinjiang, Soviet)
- Dialects: Central; Eastern; Southern
- Writing system: Perso-Arabic (Uyghur alphabet); Cyrillic (Uyghur Cyrillic); Latin (Uyghur Latin, New Script)

Official status
- Official language in: Xinjiang (China)
- Regulated by: Working Committee of Ethnic Language and Writing of Xinjiang

Language codes
- ISO 639-1: ug
- ISO 639-2: uig
- ISO 639-3: uig
- Glottolog: uigh1240
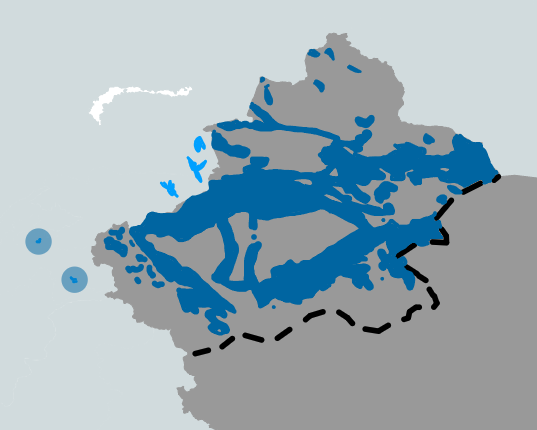
- Geographical extent of Uyghur Language in China (Xinjiang) and outskirts of Xinjiang.

Uyghur, (Note: /ˈwiːɡʊər, -ɡər/; Endonyms: ئۇيغۇر تىلى, Уйғур тили, Uyghur tili, [ʊjʁʊ́ɹ tʰɪlɪ́] (noun) ئۇيغۇرچە, Уйғурчә, Uyghurche, [ʊjʁʊ́ɹt͡ɕʰɛ] (noun, adverb)) formerly known as Turki or Eastern Turki, is a Turkic language of the Karluk branch, with 8 to 13 million native speakers (as of 2021). It is spoken primarily by the Uyghur people, most of whom live in what is now the Xinjiang Uyghur Autonomous Region of Western China. Apart from Xinjiang, significant communities of Uyghur speakers are also located in Kazakhstan, Kyrgyzstan, and Uzbekistan, and various other countries. Uyghur is a lingua franca of Xinjiang; it is widely used in both social and official spheres, as well as in print, television, and radio. Other ethnic minorities in Xinjiang also use Uyghur as a common language.

Uyghur belongs to the Karluk branch of the Turkic language family, which includes languages such as Uzbek. Like many other Turkic languages, Uyghur displays agglutination, lacks noun classes or grammatical gender, and is a left-branching language with subject–object–verb word order. With regard to vowel harmony, it has been described as being "in atrophy" with regard to Uyghur, very much akin to the situation with Uzbek. More distinctly, Uyghur processes include vowel reduction and umlauting, especially in northern dialects. In addition to other Turkic languages, Uyghur has historically been strongly influenced by Arabic and Persian, and more recently by Russian and Chinese.

The modified Arabic-derived writing system is the most common and the only standard in China, although other writing systems are used for auxiliary and historical purposes. Unlike most Arabic-derived scripts, the Uyghur Arabic alphabet has mandatory marking of all vowels due to modifications to the original Perso-Arabic script made in the 20th century. Two Latin alphabets and one Cyrillic alphabet are also used, though to a much lesser extent. The two Latin-based and the Arabic-based Uyghur alphabets have 32 characters each; the Uyghur Cyrillic alphabet also uses two iotated vowel letters (Ю and Я).

== History ==
The Middle Turkic languages are the direct ancestor of the Karluk languages, including Uyghur and the Uzbek language.

Modern Uyghur is not descended from Old Uyghur, rather, it is a descendant of the Karluk language spoken by the Kara-Khanid Khanate, as described by Mahmud al-Kashgari in the Dīwān Lughāt al-Turk. According to Gerard Clauson, Western Yugur is considered to be the true descendant of Old Uyghur and is also called "Neo-Uyghur". According to Frederik Coene, Modern Uyghur and Western Yugur belong to entirely different branches of the Turkic language family, the Karluk and the Siberian Turkic languages, respectively. The Western Yugur language, although in geographic proximity, is more closely related to the Siberian Turkic languages in Siberia. Robert Dankoff wrote that the Turkic language spoken in Kashgar and used in Kara Khanid works was Karluk, not (Old) Uyghur.

Robert Barkley Shaw wrote, "In the Turkish of Káshghar and Yarkand (which some European linguists have called Uïghur, a name unknown to the inhabitants of those towns, who know their tongue simply as Túrki), ... This would seem in many case to be a misnomer as applied to the modern language of Kashghar". Sven Hedin wrote, "In these cases it would be particularly inappropriate to normalize to the East Turkish literary language, because by so doing one would obliterate traces of national elements which have no immediate connection with the Kaschgar Turks, but on the contrary are possibly derived from the ancient Uigurs".

Probably around 1077, a scholar of the Turkic languages, Mahmud al-Kashgari from Kashgar in what is now Xinjiang, published a Turkic language dictionary and description of the geographic distribution of many Turkic languages, Dīwān Lughāt al-Turk . The book, described by scholars as an "extraordinary work," documents the rich literary tradition of Turkic languages; it contains folk tales (including descriptions of the functions of shamans) and didactic poetry (propounding "moral standards and good behaviour"), besides poems and poetry cycles on topics such as hunting and love and numerous other language materials. Other Kara-Khanid writers wrote works in the Turki Karluk Khaqani language. Yusuf Khass Hajib wrote the Kutadgu Bilig. Ahmad bin Mahmud Yukenaki (Ahmed bin Mahmud Yükneki) (Ahmet ibn Mahmut Yükneki) (Yazan Edib Ahmed b. Mahmud Yükneki) (w:tr:Edip Ahmet Yükneki) wrote the Hibat al-ḥaqāyiq (هبة الحقايق) (Hibet-ül hakayik) (Hibet ül-hakayık) (Hibbetü'l-Hakaik) (Atebetüʼl-hakayik) (w:tr:Atabetü'l-Hakayık).

Middle Turkic languages, through the influence of Perso-Arabic after the 13th century, developed into the Chagatai language, a literary language used all across Central Asia until the early 20th century. After Chaghatai fell into extinction, the standard versions of Uyghur and Uzbek were developed from dialects in the Chagatai-speaking region, showing abundant Chaghatai influence. Uyghur language today shows considerable Persian influence as a result from Chagatai, including numerous Persian loanwords.

Modern Uyghur religious literature includes tazkirat or hagiographies of Muslim religious figures and saints in Altishahr. Written sometime in the period between 1700 and 1849, the Chagatai-language Tazkirah of the Four Sacrificed Imams provides an account of the Karluk persecution of the Old Uyghur Buddhist kingdoms, containing a story about how four imams from "Mada'in" (a city, possibly in Iraq) travelled to help the conquest of Khotan, Yarkand, and Kashgar by Yusuf Qadir Khan, the Kara-Khanid khaghan. The shrines of saints are revered in Altishahr as one of Islam's essential components and the tazkirah literature reinforced the sacredness of the shrines. The tazkirat state that anyone who does not believe in the stories of the saints will be punished in the hellfire. It is written, "And those who doubt Their Holinesses the Imams will leave this world without faith and on Judgement Day their faces will be black" in the Tazkirah of the Four Sacrificed Imams. Shaw translated extracts from the Tazkirat al-Bughra on the war against the infidel Khotan. The Turki-language Tadhkirah i Khwajagan was written by M. Sadiq Kashghari. Historical works like the Tārīkh-i amniyya and Tārīkh-i ḥamīdi were written by Musa Sayrami.

The Qing dynasty commissioned dictionaries on the major languages of China, including the Chagatai language, such as the Pentaglot Dictionary.

The historical term "Uyghur" was appropriated for the language that had been known as "Eastern Turki" by government officials in the Soviet Union in 1922 and in Xinjiang in 1934. Sergey Malov was behind the idea of renaming Turki to Uyghurs. The use of the term Uyghur has led to anachronisms when describing the history of the people. In one of his books the term Uyghur was deliberately not used by James A. Millward. The name Khāqāniyya was given to the Qarluks who inhabited Kāshghar and Bālāsāghūn, the inhabitants were not Uighur, but their language has been retroactively labelled as Uighur by scholars. The Qarakhanids called their own language the "Turk" or "Kashgar" language and did not use Uighur to describe their own language, Uighur was used to describe the language of non-Muslims but Chinese scholars have anachronistically called a Qarakhanid work written by Kashgari as "Uighur". The name "Altishahri-Jungharian Uyghur" was used by the Soviet educated Uyghur Qadir Haji in 1927.

== Classification ==
The Uyghur language belongs to the Karluk Turkic (Qarluq) branch of the Turkic language family. It is closely related to Äynu, Lop, Ili Turki, the extinct language Chagatay (the East Karluk languages), and more distantly to Uzbek (which is West Karluk).

== Dialects ==
Lopnor Uighur is classified as Critically Endangered by the UNESCO Atlas of the World's Languages in Danger

It is widely accepted that Uyghur has three main dialects, all based on their geographical distribution. Each of these main dialects have a number of sub-dialects which all are mutually intelligible to some extent.

- Central: Spoken in an area stretching from Kumul southward to Yarkand
- Southern: Spoken in an area stretching from Guma eastward to Qarkilik
- Eastern: Spoken in an area stretching from Qarkilik northward to Qongköl. The Lop dialect (also known as Lopluk) that falls under the Eastern dialect of the Uighur language is classified as a critically endangered language. It is spoken by less than 0.5% of the overall Uighur speakers population but has tremendous values in comparative research.

The Central dialects are spoken by 90% of the Uyghur-speaking population, while the two other branches of dialects only are spoken by a relatively small minority.

Vowel reduction is common in the northern parts of where Uyghur is spoken, but not in the south.

== Status ==
Uyghur is spoken by an estimated 8–11 million people in total. In addition to being spoken primarily in the Xinjiang Uyghur Autonomous Region of Western China, mainly by the Uyghur people, Uyghur was also spoken by some 300,000 people in Kazakhstan in 1993, some 90,000 in Kyrgyzstan and Uzbekistan in 1998, 3,000 in Afghanistan and 1,000 in Mongolia, both in 1982. Smaller communities also exist in Albania, Australia, Belgium, Canada, Germany, Indonesia, Pakistan, Saudi Arabia, Sweden, Tajikistan, Turkey, United Kingdom and the United States (New York City).

The Uyghurs are one of the 56 recognized ethnic groups in China and Uyghur is one of the two linguae francae of Xinjiang, along with Standard Chinese. As a result, Uyghur can be heard in most social domains in Xinjiang and also in schools, government and courts. Of the other ethnic minorities in Xinjiang, those populous enough to have their own autonomous prefectures, such as the Kazakhs and the Kyrgyz, have access to schools and government services in their native language. Smaller minorities, however, do not have a choice and must attend Uyghur-medium schools. These include the Xibe, Tajiks, Daurs and Russians.

Early in the era of the People's Republic of China (PRC), Uyghurs could choose between two separate secular school systems, one conducted in their own language and one offering instructions only in Chinese. Many Uyghurs linked the preservation of their cultural and religious identity with the language of instruction in schools and therefore preferred Uyghur language schools. During the 1980s the Chinese government pursued a new policy of cultural liberalization in Xinjiang and adopted a flexible language policy nationally. Despite a positive response among party officials and minority groups, the policy was viewed as unsuccessful and from the mid-1980s its official pluralistic language policy became increasingly subordinate to a covert policy of minority assimilation motivated by geopolitical concerns. Consequently, and in Xinjiang particularly, multilingualism and cultural pluralism were restricted to favor a "monolingual, monocultural model". In 2000, a special senior-secondary boarding school program for Uyghurs, the Xinjiang Class, with course work conducted entirely in Chinese was established. In 2002, Xinjiang University, originally a bilingual institution, had ceased offering courses in the Uyghur language. From 2004 onward, the government policy has been that classes should be conducted in Chinese as much as possible and in some selected regions, instruction in Chinese began in the first grade. By the 2010s, the Chinese government had implemented bi-lingual education in most regions of Xinjiang. The primary medium of instruction is Standard Chinese, with only a few hours a week devoted to Uyghur literature. The bi-lingual education system teaches Xinjiang's students all STEM classes using only Chinese, or a combination of Uyghur and Chinese. However, research has shown that due to differences in the order of words and grammar between the Uyghur and the Chinese language, many students face obstacles in learning courses such as Mathematics under the bi-lingual education system. Despite this policy, few Han children are taught to speak Uyghur. By the late 2010s, more Uyghur students were attending residential schools far from their home communities where they are not able to speak Uyghur, thus making the language vulnerable to extinction according to some. In 2020, a monolingual Chinese language education is known to have been introduced as an option in an influential high school in Kashgar that formerly provided bilingual education.

Uyghur has been described as an endangered language by the language institute INALCO in 2021.

Uyghur language has been supported by Google Translate since February 2020.

About 80 newspapers and magazines are available in Uyghur; five TV channels and ten publishers serve as the Uyghur media.

Outside of China, Radio Free Europe used to broadcast a 15-minute daily Uyghur language program from the late 1960s until 1979, when it was shut down by order of then-national security advisor Zbigniew Brzezinski in an effort to enlist China's support against the Soviet Union. Radio Free Asia began its Uyghur-language service in 1998, and was shut down by the Trump administration in 2025 due to spending cuts.

Poet and activist Muyesser Abdul'ehed teaches the language to diaspora children online as well as publishes a magazine written by children for children in Uyghur.

== Phonology ==
=== Vowels ===
Uyghur has a seven-vowel inventory, with [i] and [e] not distinguished. The vowel letters of the Uyghur language are, in their alphabetical order (in the Latin script), ⟨a⟩, ⟨e⟩, ⟨ë⟩, ⟨i⟩, ⟨o⟩, ⟨ö⟩, ⟨u⟩, ⟨ü⟩. There are no diphthongs. Hiatus occurs in some loanwords.
Uyghur vowels are distinguished on the bases of height, backness and roundness. It has been argued, within a lexical phonology framework, that /e/ has a back counterpart /ɤ/, and modern Uyghur lacks a clear differentiation between /i/ and /ɯ/.

	Front		Back	
	Unrounded	Rounded	Unrounded	Rounded
Close	i ([ɪ]~[e])	y	(ɯ)	u
Mid	i ([ɪ]~[e])	ø		o
Open	æ		ɑ	

		Front		Back	
		UR	R	UR	R
Close	Arabic	ئى / ى	ئۈ / ۈ	ئى / ى	ئۇ / ۇ
Close	Latin	I i	Ü ü	I i	U u
Close	IPA	[ɪ]	[ʏ]	([ɯ])	[u]
Mid	Arabic	ئې / ې	ئۆ / ۆ		ئو / و
Mid	Latin	Ë ë	Ö ö		O o
Mid	IPA	[e]	[ø]		[o]
Open	Arabic	ئە / ە		ئا / ا	
Open	Latin	E e		A a	
Open	IPA	æ		ɑ	

Uyghur vowels are by default short, but long vowels also exist because of historical vowel assimilation (above) and through loanwords. Underlyingly long vowels would resist vowel reduction and devoicing, introduce non-final stress, and be analyzed as |Vj| or |Vr| before a few suffixes. However, the conditions in which they are actually pronounced as distinct from their short counterparts have not been fully researched.

The high vowels undergo some tensing when they occur adjacent to alveolars (s, z, r, l), palatals (j), dentals (t̪, d̪, n̪), and post-alveolar affricates (t͡ʃ, d͡ʒ), e.g. chiraq [t͡ʃʰˈiraq] 'lamp', jenubiy [d͡ʒɛnʊˈbiː] 'southern', yüz [jyz] 'face; hundred', suda [suːˈda] 'in/at (the) water'.

Both [i] and [ɯ] undergo apicalisation after alveodental continuants in unstressed syllables, e.g. siler [sɪ̯læː(r)] 'you (plural)', ziyan [zɪ̯ˈjɑːn] 'harm'. They are medialised after /χ/ or before /l/, e.g. til [tʰɨl] 'tongue', xizmet [χɨzˈmɛt] 'work; job; service'. After velars, uvulars and /f/ they are realised as [e], e.g. giram [ɡeˈrʌm] 'gram', xelqi [χɛlˈqʰe] 'his [etc.] nation', Finn [fen] 'Finn'. Between two syllables that contain a rounded back vowel each, they are realised as back, e.g. qolimu [qʰɔˈlɯmʊ] 'also his [etc.] arm'.

Any vowel undergoes laxing and backing when it occurs in uvular (/q/, /ʁ/, /χ/) and laryngeal (glottal) (/ɦ/, /ʔ/) environments, e.g. qiz [qʰɤz] 'girl', qëtiq [qʰɤˈtɯq] 'yogurt', qeghez [qʰæˈʁæz] 'paper', qum [qʰʊm] 'sand', qolay [qʰɔˈlʌɪ] 'convenient', qan [qʰɑn] 'blood', ëghiz [ʔeˈʁez] 'mouth', hisab [ɦɤˈsʌp] 'number', hës [ɦɤs] 'hunch', hemrah [ɦæmˈrʌh] 'partner', höl [ɦœɫ] 'wet', hujum [ɦuˈd͡ʒʊm] 'assault', halqa [ɦɑlˈqʰɑ] 'ring'.

Lowering tends to apply to the non-high vowels when a syllable-final liquid assimilates to them, e.g. kör [cʰøː] 'look!', boldi [bɔlˈdɪ] 'he [etc.] became', ders [dæːs] 'lesson', tar [tʰɑː(r)] 'narrow'.

Official Uyghur orthographies do not mark vowel length, and also do not distinguish between /ɪ/ (e.g., بىلىم /bɪlɪm/ 'knowledge') and back /ɯ/ (e.g., تىلىم /tɯlɯm/ 'my language'); these two sounds are in complementary distribution, but phonological analyses claim that they play a role in vowel harmony and are separate phonemes. /e/ only occurs in words of non-Turkic origin and as the result of vowel raising.

Uyghur has systematic vowel reduction (or vowel raising) as well as vowel harmony. Words usually agree in vowel backness, but compounds, loans, and some other exceptions often break vowel harmony. Suffixes surface with the rightmost [back] value in the stem, and /e, ɪ/ are transparent (as they do not contrast for backness). Uyghur also has rounding harmony.

=== Consonants ===
	Labial		Dental		Post- alveolar/Palatal		Velar		Uvular		Glottal	
Nasal		m		n				ŋ				
Stop	p	b	t	d	tʃ	dʒ	k	ɡ	q		ʔ	
Fricative	(f)	(v)	s	z	ʃ	ʒ			χ	ʁ		ɦ
Trill				r								
Approximant				l		j		w				

Uyghur voiceless stops are aspirated word-initially and intervocalically. The pairs /p, b/, /t, d/, /k, ɡ/, and /q, ʁ/ alternate, with the voiced member devoicing in syllable-final position, except in word-initial syllables. This devoicing process is usually reflected in the official orthography, but an exception has been recently made for certain Perso-Arabic loans. Voiceless phonemes do not become voiced in standard Uyghur.

Suffixes display a slightly different type of consonant alternation. The phonemes /ɡ/ and /ʁ/ anywhere in a suffix alternate as governed by vowel harmony, where /ɡ/ occurs with front vowels and /ʁ/ with back ones. Devoicing of a suffix-initial consonant can occur only in the cases of /d/ → [t], /ɡ/ → [k], and /ʁ/ → [q], when the preceding consonant is voiceless. Lastly, the rule that /g/ must occur with front vowels and /ʁ/ with back vowels can be broken when either [k] or [q] in suffix-initial position becomes assimilated by the other due to the preceding consonant being such.

Loan phonemes have influenced Uyghur to various degrees. /d͡ʒ/ and /χ/ were borrowed from Arabic and have been nativized, while /ʒ/ from Persian less so. /f/ only exists in very recent Russian and Chinese loans, since Perso-Arabic (and older Russian and Chinese) /f/ became Uyghur /p/. Perso-Arabic loans have also made the contrast between /k, ɡ/ and /q, ʁ/ phonemic, as they occur as allophones in native words, the former set near front vowels and the latter near back vowels. Some speakers of Uyghur distinguish /v/ from /w/ in Russian loans, but this is not represented in most orthographies. Other phonemes occur natively only in limited contexts, i.e. /h/ only in few interjections, /d/, /ɡ/, and /ʁ/ rarely initially, and /z/ only morpheme-final. Therefore, the pairs */t͡ʃ, d͡ʒ/, */ʃ, ʒ/, and */s, z/ do not alternate.

=== Phonotactics ===
The primary syllable structure of Uyghur is CV(C)(C). Uyghur syllable structure is usually CV or CVC, but CVCC can also occur in some words. When syllable-coda clusters occur, CC tends to become CVC in some speakers especially if the first consonant is not a sonorant. In Uyghur, any consonant phoneme can occur as the syllable onset or coda, except for /ʔ/ which only occurs in the onset and /ŋ/, which never occurs word-initially. In general, Uyghur phonology tends to simplify phonemic consonant clusters by means of elision and epenthesis.

== Orthography ==
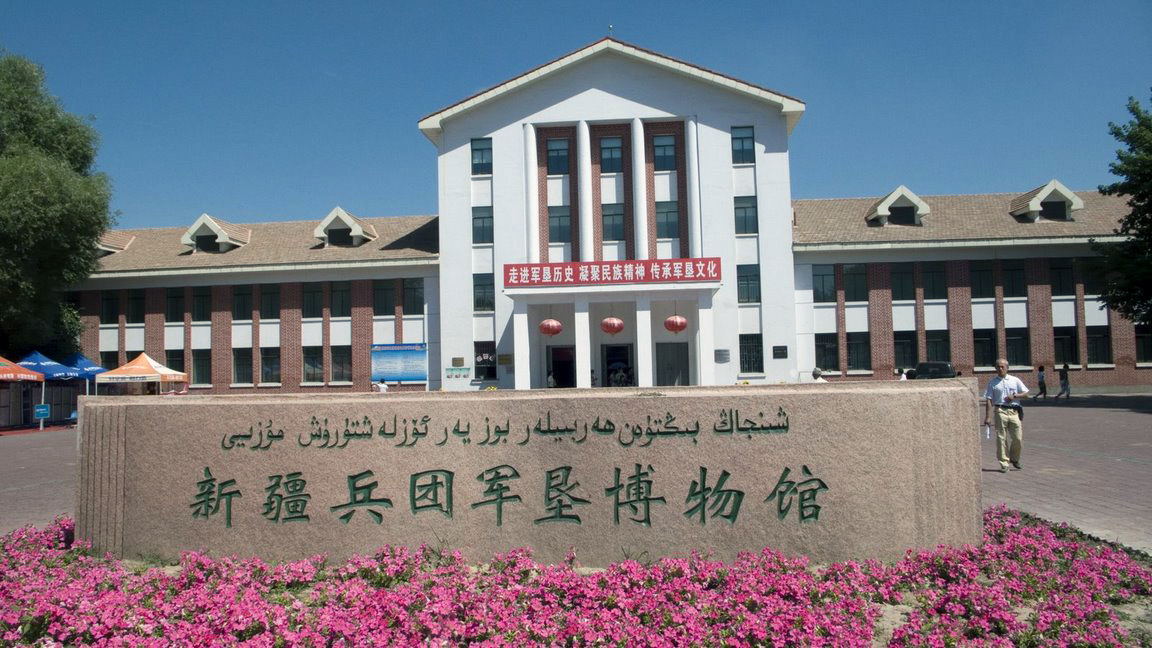
A signboard in front of the Bingtuan Military Museum of Xinjiang written in Uyghur (using Arabic script) and Standard Chinese

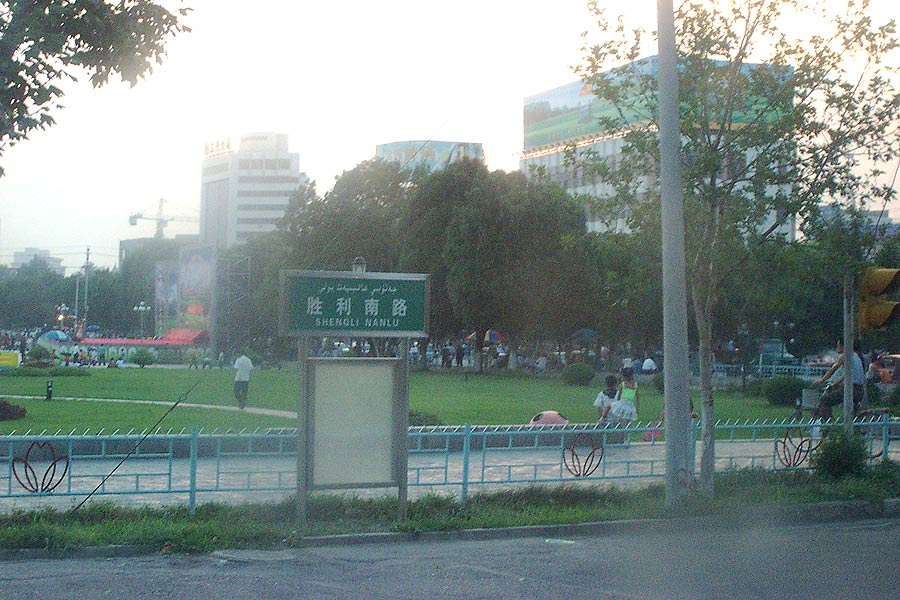
A sign in Ghulja, Xinjiang, written in Uyghur (using Arabic script) and Chinese (both Hanzi and Pinyin)

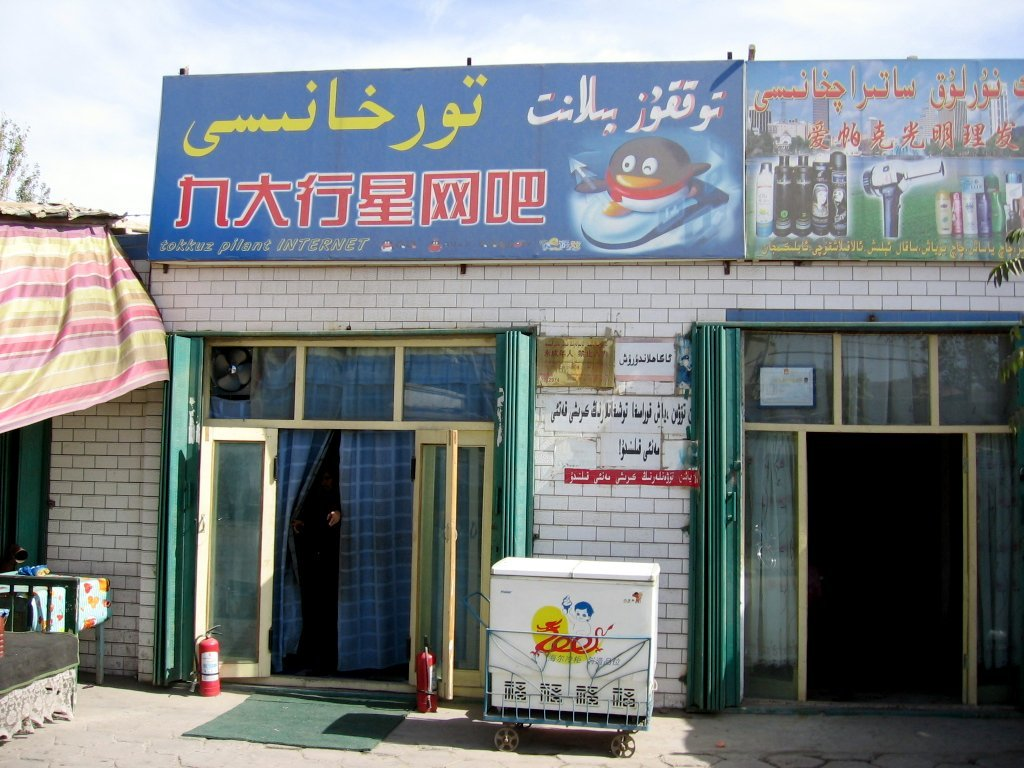
Internet café (on the left) and barbershop (on the right) in Khotan oasis city in the Xinjiang Uyghur Autonomous Region of the People's Republic of China. Address written in Uyghur with the Arabic script.

The Karluk language started to be written with the Perso-Arabic script (Kona Yëziq) in the 10th century upon the conversion of the Kara-Khanids to Islam. This Perso-Arabic script (Kona Yëziq) was reformed in the 20th century with modifications to represent all Modern Uyghur sounds including short vowels and eliminate Arabic letters representing sounds not found in Modern Uyghur. Unlike many other modern Turkic languages, Uyghur is primarily written using a Perso-Arabic-based alphabet, although a Cyrillic alphabet and two Latin alphabets also are in use to a much lesser extent. Unusually for an alphabet based on the Arabic script, full transcription of vowels is indicated. (Among the Arabic family of alphabets, only a few, such as Kurdish, distinguish all vowels without the use of optional diacritics.)

The four alphabets in use today can be seen below.

- Uyghur Arabic alphabet or UEY
- Uyghur Cyrillic alphabet or USY
- The Uyghur New Script or UYY
- Uyghur Latin alphabet or ULY

In the table below the alphabets are shown side-by-side for comparison, together with a phonetic transcription in the International Phonetic Alphabet.

No.	IPA	UEY	USY	UYY	ULY	No.	IPA	UEY	USY	UYY	ULY
1	/ɑ/	ئا	А а	A a		17	/q/	ق	Қ қ	Ⱪ ⱪ	Q q
2	/ɛ/ ~ /æ/	ئە	Ә ә	Ə ə	E e	18	/k/	ك	К к	K k	
3	/b/	ب	Б б	B b		19	/ɡ/	گ	Г г	G g	
4	/p/	پ	П п	P p		20	/ŋ/	ڭ	Ң ң	Ng ng	
5	/t/	ت	Т т	T t		21	/l/	ل	Л л	L l	
6	/dʒ/	ج	Җ җ	J j	J j	22	/m/	م	М м	M m	
6	/dʒ/	ج	Җ җ	Zh zh	J j	22	/m/	م	М м	M m	
7	/tʃ/	چ	Ч ч	Q q	Ch ch	23	/n/	ن	Н н	N n	
7	/tʃ/	چ	Ч ч	Ch ch	Ch ch	23	/n/	ن	Н н	N n	
8	/χ/	خ	Х х	H h	X x	24	/h/	ھ	Һ һ	Ⱨ ⱨ	H h
9	/d/	د	Д д	D d		25	/o/	ئو	О о	O o	
10	/r/	ر	Р р	R r		26	/u/	ئۇ	У у	U u	
11	/z/	ز	З з	Z z		27	/ø/	ئۆ	Ө ө	Ɵ ɵ	Ö ö
12	/ʒ/	ژ	Ж ж	Ⱬ ⱬ	Zh zh	28	/y/	ئۈ	Ү ү	Ü ü	
13	/s/	س	С с	S s		29	/v/~/w/	ۋ	В в	V v	W w
13	/s/	س	С с	S s		29	/v/~/w/	ۋ	В в	W w	W w
14	/ʃ/	ش	Ш ш	X x	Sh sh	30	/e/	ئې	Е е	E e	Ë ë (formerly É é)
14	/ʃ/	ش	Ш ш	Sh sh	Sh sh	30	/e/	ئې	Е е	E e	Ë ë (formerly É é)
15	/ʁ/	غ	Ғ ғ	Ƣ ƣ	Gh gh	31	/ɪ/ ~ /i/	ئى	И и	I i	
16	/f/	ف	Ф ф	F f		32	/j/	ي	Й й	Y y	

== Grammar ==
Like other Turkic languages, Uyghur is a head-final agglutinative language with a subject–object–verb word order. Nouns are inflected for number and case, but not gender and definiteness like in many other languages. There are two numbers: singular and plural and six different cases: nominative, accusative, dative, locative, ablative and genitive. Verbs are conjugated for tense: present and past; voice: causative and passive; aspect: continuous and mood: e.g. ability. Verbs may be negated as well.

== Lexicon ==
The core lexicon of the Uyghur language is of Turkic stock, but due to different kinds of language contact throughout its history, it has adopted many loanwords. Kazakh, Uzbek and Chagatai are all Turkic languages which have had a strong influence on Uyghur. Many words of Arabic origin have come into the language through Persian and Tajik, which again have come through Uzbek and to a greater extent, Chagatai. Many words of Arabic origin have also entered the language directly through Islamic literature after the introduction of Islam around the 10th century.

Chinese in Xinjiang and Russian elsewhere had the greatest influence on Uyghur. Loanwords from these languages are all quite recent, although older borrowings exist as well, such as borrowings from Dungan, a Mandarin language spoken by the Dungan people of Central Asia. A number of loanwords of German origin have also reached Uyghur through Russian.

Code-switching with Chinese is common in spoken Uyghur, but stigmatized in formal contexts. Xinjiang Television and other mass media, for example, will use the rare Russian loanword aplisin (апельсин, apel'sin) for the word "orange", rather than the ubiquitous Chinese loanword juze (橘子; júzi). In a sentence, this mixing might look like:

مېنىڭ تەلەفونىم گۇئەنجى، شۇڭا سىزگە دۇئەنشىن ئەۋەتەلمىدىم.
Më-ning telfon-im guenji, shunga siz-ge duenshin ewet-elmi-dim.
1sg-GEN cellphone-POSS.1sg shut.down, so 2sg-DAT text.message send-CAP.NEG-PST.1sg
My (cell) phone shut down (关机; guānjī), so I wasn't able to send you a text message (短信; duǎnxìn).

Below are some examples of common loanwords in the Uyghur language.

Origin	Source word	Source (in IPA)	Uyghur word	Uyghur (in IPA)	English
Persian	افسوس	[afˈsuːs]	epsus ئەپسۇس	/ɛpsus/	pity
Persian	گوشت	[ɡoːʃt]	gösh گۆش	/ɡøʃ/	meat
Persian	ساعت	[ˈsaːʔat]	saet سائەت	/sɑʔɛt/	hour
Russian	велосипед	[vʲɪləsʲɪˈpʲɛt]	wëlsipit ۋېلسىپىت	/welsipit/	bicycle
Russian	доктор	[ˈdoktər]	doxtur دوختۇر	/doχtur/	doctor (medical)
Russian	поезд	[ˈpo.jɪst]	poyiz پويىز	/pojiz/	train
Russian	область	[ˈobləsʲtʲ]	oblast ئوبلاست	/oblɑst/	oblast, region
Russian	телевизор	[tʲɪlʲɪˈvʲizər]	tëlëwizor تېلېۋىزور	/televizor/	television set
Chinese	凉粉, liángfěn	[li̯ɑŋ˧˥fən˨˩]	lempung لەڭپۇڭ	/lɛmpuŋ/	agar-agar jelly
Chinese	豆腐, dòufu	[tou̯˥˩fu˩]	dufu دۇفۇ	/dufu/	bean curd/tofu
Chinese	桌子, zhuōzi	[ʈʂwótsɹ̩]	joza جوزا	/d͡ʒozɑ/	table
Chinese	冰箱, bīngxiāng	[píŋɕjáŋ]	bingshang بىڭشاڭ	/biŋʃɑŋ/	refrigerator

== Sample text ==
The following is a sample text in Uyghur of Article 1 of the Universal Declaration of Human Rights with an English translation.

Arabic script:	ھەممە ئادەم زانىدىنلا ئەركىن، ئىززەت-ھۆرمەت ۋە ھوقۇقتا باپباراۋەر بولۇپ تۇغۇلغان۔ ئۇلار ئەقىلغە ۋە ۋىجدانغا ئىگە ھەمدە بىر-بىرىگە قېرىنداشلىق مۇناسىۋىتىگە خاس روھ بىلەن مۇئامىلە قىلىشى كېرەك۔
Latin script:	Hemme adem zanidinla erkin, izzet-hörmet we hoquqta bapbarawer bolup tughulghan. Ular eqilghe we wijdan'gha ige hemde bir-birige qërindashliq munasiwitige xas roh bilen muamile qilishi kërek.
Cyrillic script:	Һәммә адәм занидинла әркин, иззәт-һөрмәт вә һоқуқта бапбаравәр болуп туғулған. Улар әқилгә вә виҗданға игә һәмдә бир-биригә қериндашлиқ мунасивитигә хас роһ билән муамилә қилиши керәк.
IPA transcription:	[ɦɛmmɛ́ ɑtɛ́m zɑnɯ̥tɯnlɑ́ ɛɹkʰɪ́n ɪzzɛ́t ɦœɹmɛ́t wɛ ɦɔχʊ̥χtʰɑ pɑ́p̚pɑɹɑwɛ́ɹ pɔɫʊp tʰʊʁʊɫʁɑ́n ‖ ʊɫɑ́ɹ ɛχɤɫʁɛ́ wɛ wɪʑtɑnʁɑ́ ɪ̥kɛ́ ɦɛmtɛ́ pɪɹ‿pɪɹɪkɛ́ qʰɘɹɪntɑɕɫɤ́χ mʊnɑsɯwɯtʰɪ̥kɛ́ χɑ(s) ɹɔh pɪlɛ́n mʊɑmɪlɛ́ qʰɤlɯɕɪ́ kʰeɹɛ́k ‖]
English original:	All human beings are born free and equal in dignity and rights. They are endowed with reason and conscience and should act towards one another in a spirit of brotherhood.

== See also ==
- Languages of China
