= H with descender =

Latin letter H with descender

- Ⱨ ⱨ

Usage
- Writing system: Latin script
- Type: Alphabetic
- Language of origin: Uyghur
- Sound values: [h]
- In Unicode: U+2C67, U+2C68

History
Development
O6N24V28
    - 𐤇
      - Η
        - 𐌇
          - H h
            - Ⱨ ⱨ

Other
- Writing direction: Left-to-Right

H with descender (Ⱨ ⱨ) is a letter of the Latin alphabet, derived from H with the addition of a small descender. It was used in Uyghur to represent [h] (~ English h), while a regular H was used to represent [x] (~ German ch in ach).

This letter was in use from the early 1960s, when a Latin alphabet, the Uyghur New Script, was introduced for writing Uyghur to replace the Arabic script, until 1984–86 when the Latin alphabet was phased out and the official script was changed back to Arabic. The equivalent Arabic letter is ھ, while the Cyrillic equivalent is the shha (Һ һ).

The capital letter is homoglyphic to the Cyrillic letter en with descender (Ң ң) used in various Turkic languages, including Uyghur itself in its own Cyrillic alphabet. Its lowercase form is homoglyphic with the shha with descender used in the Tati and Juhuri languages, which represents the same sound as in Latin.

== Computing codes ==
Character information
Preview	Ⱨ		ⱨ	
Unicode name	LATIN CAPITAL LETTER H WITH DESCENDER		LATIN SMALL LETTER H WITH DESCENDER	
Encodings	decimal	hex	dec	hex
Unicode	11367	U+2C67	11368	U+2C68
UTF-8	226 177 167	E2 B1 A7	226 177 168	E2 B1 A8
Numeric character reference	&#11367;	&#x2C67;	&#11368;	&#x2C68;

Ⱨ was added to Unicode in version 5.0 (2006).

== See also ==
- Ꜧ ꜧ : Latin letter Heng
- Ⱪ ⱪ : Latin letter K with descender
- Ⱬ ⱬ : Latin letter Z with descender
- Ң ң : Cyrillic letter En with descender
- Ҳ ҳ : Cyrillic letter Kha with descender
- Ԧ ԧ : Cyrillic letter Shha with descender
- Ꞑ ꞑ : Latin letter N with descender
