= Kona Yeziⱪ =

Kona Yeziⱪ may refer to:

Arabic-derived scripts for central-Asian languages:

- Chagatai script, variant of Arabic script used for Chagatai, and formerly Uyghur, languages
- Uyghur Ereb Yéziqi, specialized for Uyghur language
