= Xinjiang Uyghur =

Xinjiang Uyghur (older spellings variously include Sinkiang Uyghur, Sinkiang Uygur, Sinkiang Uighur etc.) may refer to:

- Uyghurs in Xinjiang
- The Xinjiang standard of the Uyghur language

== See also ==
- Xinjiang, an autonomous region of China for the Uyghur ethnic minority
- Autonomous administrative divisions of China
- Apostolic Prefecture of Xinjiang-Urumqi
