= Shha with descender =

Cyrillic letter

- Ԧ ԧ

Usage
- Writing system: Cyrillic
- Type: Alphabetic
- Sound values: [ʕ]

History
- Transliterations: Ⱨ ⱨ

Shha with descender (Ԧ ԧ; italics: Ԧ ԧ) is a letter of the Cyrillic script. Its form is derived from the Cyrillic letter Shha (Һ һ Һ һ) by the addition of a descender to the right leg.

Shha with descender is used in the Cyrillic alphabets of the Tati and Juhuri languages, where it represents a voiced pharyngeal fricative.

== Computing codes ==
Character information
Preview	Ԧ		ԧ	
Unicode name	CYRILLIC CAPITAL LETTER; SHHA WITH DESCENDER		CYRILLIC SMALL LETTER; SHHA WITH DESCENDER	
Encodings	decimal	hex	dec	hex
Unicode	1318	U+0526	1319	U+0527
UTF-8	212 166	D4 A6	212 167	D4 A7
Numeric character reference	&#1318;	&#x526;	&#1319;	&#x527;

== See also ==
- Ⱨ ⱨ : Latin letter H with descender
- Cyrillic characters in Unicode
