= Uyghur dialects =

Family of language subvarieties

Uyghur is a Turkic language spoken in the Xinjiang Uyghur Autonomous Region in China by the Uyghur people, with two standard languages and several dialects, all mutually intelligible at large, despite differences.

== Dialects ==
Various classifications of the dialects of Uyghur have been proposed through time. Today, however, it is widely accepted that there are three major dialect groups. This was originally introduced by E. R. Tenishev, but has since been modified by other linguists, like M. Osmanov, though the original classification by E. R. Tenishev remains the most widely accepted.

The classification by E. R. Tenishev can be seen below.

| Central | Dialect of Turpan |
| Central | Dialect of Kucha |
| Central | Dialect of Aksu |
| Central | Dialect of Kashgar |
| Central | Dialect of Yarkand |
| Southern | Dialect of Hotan |
| Eastern | Dialect of Lopnur |

R. F. Hahn divides the Central branch further into a Northern and Southern branch, and includes the dialects of Taranchi, Ili and Hami as Northern Central dialects, and the dialects of Tarim, Dolan, Artux and Mughal as Southern Central dialects, also keeping the dialects proposed by E. R. Tenishev. And he also includes the dialects of Qiemo, Charqaliq and perhaps Kelpin in the Southern branch.

The dialects included in the Central branch by R. F. Hahn are also included by M. Osmanov, although he also chooses to go further and divides the Southern branch into three sub-branches: a sub-branch including the dialect of Guma, a sub-branch including the dialects of Elchi and Karakax, and a sub-branch including the dialects of Cheriya/Keriya, Niya and Qiemo.

A classification where all these modifications are present can be seen below.

| Central | Northern | Dialect of Ürümqi |
| Central | Northern | Dialect of Ili |
| Central | Northern | Dialect of Taranchi |
| Central | Northern | Dialect of Turpan |
| Central | Northern | Dialect of Kumul |
| Central | Southern | Dialect of Kashgar |
| Central | Southern | Dialect of Dolan |
| Central | Southern | Dialect of Artush |
| Central | Southern | Dialect of Tarim |
| Central | Southern | Dialect of Mughal |
| Central | Southern | Dialect of Kucha |
| Central | Dialect of Yarkant | |
| Central | Dialect of Aksu | |
| Southern | Branch #1 | Dialect of Guma |
| Southern | Branch #2 | Dialect of Echi |
| Southern | Branch #2 | Dialect of Qaraqash |
| Southern | Branch #3 | Dialect of Keriya |
| Southern | Branch #3 | Dialect of Niya |
| Southern | Branch #3 | Dialect of Qiemo |
| Southern | Branch #3 | Dialect of Hotan |
| Southern | Eastern | Dialect of Lopnor |

The dialectal classification of E. R. Tenishev is based on four parameters: the quality of the phoneme /i/, metaphony, consonant assimilation and the conjugation of verbs in the future tense. M. Osmanov on the other hand has based his classification on two different parameters: the conjugation of the present-future tense and the form of the imperfect participle.

The Central dialects are spoken by 90% of the Uyghur-speaking population, while the two other branches of dialects only are spoken by a relatively small minority.

== Standard languages ==
There are two standard languages of the Uyghur language in use which can be seen below.

- Standard Xinjiang Uyghur: Used primarily in Xinjiang
- Standard Soviet Uyghur: Used primarily in Kazakhstan

The first is the standard language used in Xinjiang and is based upon the Northern Central dialect of Ürümqi, while the second is the standard language used primarily in Kazakhstan and is based upon the Northern Central dialect of Ili. Although the Soviet Union no longer exists, the label "Soviet" has remained in the name.

The differences between the two standard languages are mostly seen in the orthography, where Standard Xinjiang Uyghur uses an Arabic-derived alphabet, Uyghur Ereb Yéziqi, while Standard Soviet Uyghur uses a Cyrillic-derived alphabet, Uyghur Siril Yéziqi and in the lexicon where Standard Xinjiang Uyghur is heavily influenced by Chinese, in particular Mandarin Chinese, while Standard Soviet Uyghur is heavily influenced by Russian.
