= Z with descender =

Letter of the Latin alphabet

Ⱬ (minuscule: ⱬ, Unicode codepoints U+2C6B and U+2C6C, respectively) is a Latin letter Z with a descender.

Z with descender in Doulos SIL

It is used in pre-1983 romanization of the Uyghur language, transliterating ژ [ʒ], a pre-consonantal allophone of ج /dʒ/ (see Qona Yëziq), but occurring independently in a few words of Russian, Persian or Western origin (such as ⱬurnal from journal). It corresponds to the digraph zh in the current ULY standard.

Also, Z with descender was used in Latin orthographies of the Abaza language, Adyghe language, Avar language, Dargwa language, Kabardian language, Lak language, Komi language, Laz language, Lezgian language, Nanai language, Selkup language, Tabasaran language, and Chechen language. It represented a voiced alveolo-palatal sibilant [ʑ]. It is also used in the former Latin alphabet for the Dungan language to represent the voiceless retroflex affricate [tʂ] or the voiceless alveolo-palatal affricate [tɕ].
