= Uyghur Cyrillic alphabet =

Uyghur-language alphabet used in post-Soviet states

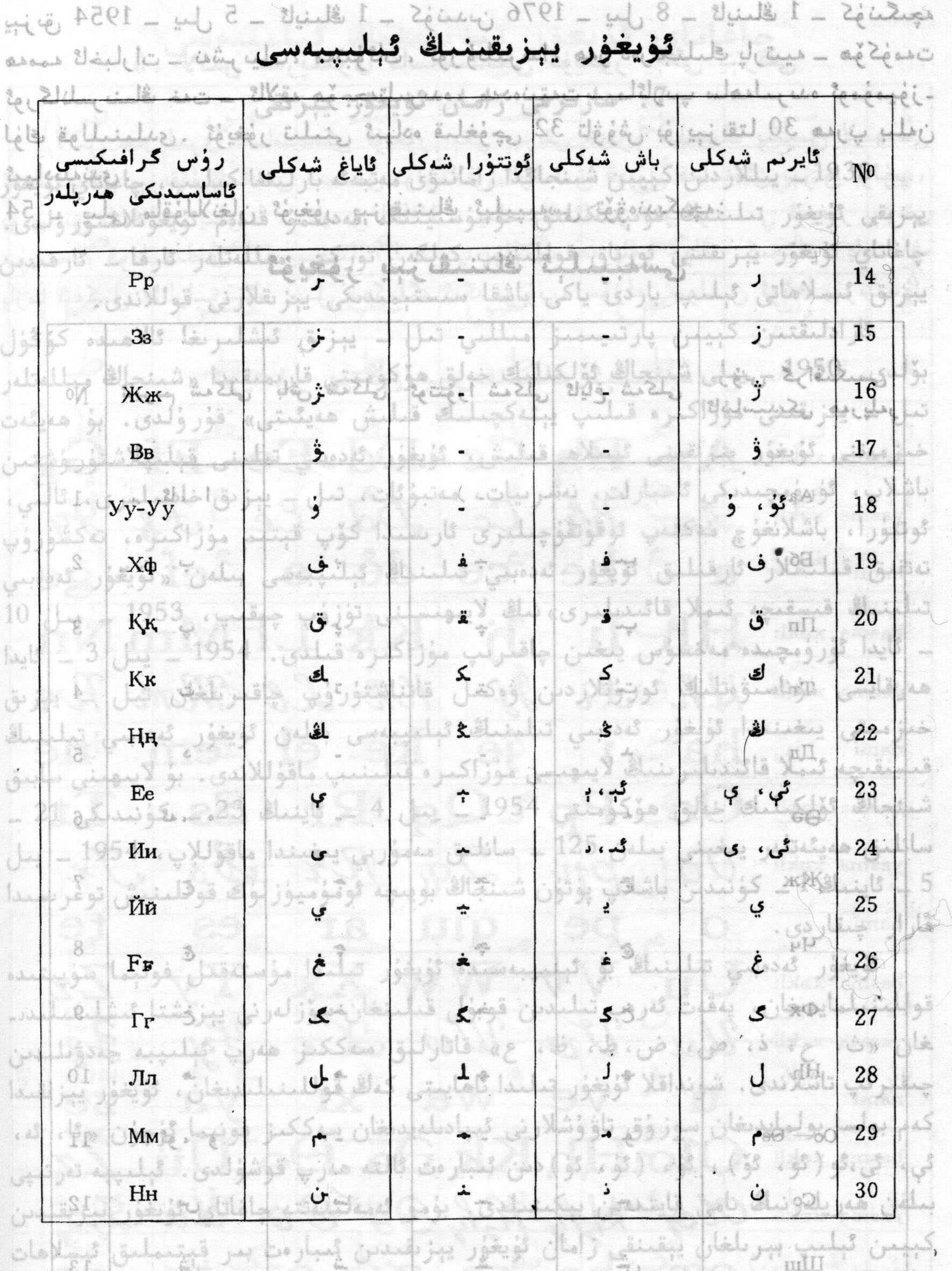
- A table showing the Uyghur Cyrillic and Arabic scripts

Uyghur name
- Uyghur: ئۇيغۇر كىرىل يېزىقى
Transcriptions
- Latin Yëziqi: Uyghur Kiril Yëziqi
- Siril Yëziqi: Уйғур Кирил Йезиқи

Chinese name
- Simplified Chinese: 西里尔维文
- Traditional Chinese: 西里爾維文
Transcriptions
Standard Mandarin
- Hanyu Pinyin: Xīlǐ'ěr Wéiwén

Russian name
- Russian: Уйгурский кириллический алфавит

The Uyghur Cyrillic alphabet (Uyghur: Уйғур Кирил Йезиқи, Arabic alphabet: ئۇيغۇر كىرىل يېزىقى) is a Cyrillic-derived alphabet used for writing the Uyghur language, primarily by Uyghurs living in countries of the former Soviet Union. It is used to write Standard Soviet Uyghur. It was created around 1937 by the Government of the Soviet Union, which wanted an alternative to the Latin-derived alphabet it had devised some eleven years earlier, in 1926. The Soviets dropped their Latin script for Uyghur because they feared its local use would encourage Soviet Uyghurs to seek closer ties with Turkey, which had switched to a Latin-based alphabet in 1927–1928. After the proclamation of the communist People's Republic of China in 1949, Russian linguists began helping the Chinese with codifying the various minority languages of China and promoting Cyrillic-derived alphabets. The Uyghurs of China thus also came to use the Cyrillic script for a period of time, until the Sino-Soviet split.

Amid deteriorating relations with the Soviet Union, China dismissed the Cyrillic script and introduced the Uyghur New Script in 1959. The New Script entered widespread use in China beginning in 1965. In 1982, China officially switched to the Arabic script.

The letters in the Uyghur Cyrillic alphabet are, in order:

Majuscule	Minuscule	IPA
А	a	ɑ, a
Ә	ə	ɛ, æ
Б	б	b
В	в	w, v
Г	г	g
Ғ (F)	ғ (ꜰ)	ʁ, ɣ
Д	д	d
Е	е	e
Ё	ё	jo
Ж	ж	ʒ
Җ	җ	d͡ʒ
З	з	z
И	и	i, ɨ
Й	й	j
К	к	k
Қ	қ	q
Л	л	l
М	м	m
Н	н	n
Ң	ң	ŋ
О	о	o, ɔ
Ө	ө	ø
П	п	p
Р	р	r, ɾ
С	с	s
Т	т	t
У	у	u, ʊ
Ү	ү	y, ʏ
Ф	ф	f, ɸ
Х	х	χ, x
Һ	һ	h, ɦ
Ц	ц	t͡s
Ч	ч	t͡ʃ
Ш	ш	ʃ
Ю	ю	ju
Я	я	ja
