= K with descender =

Latin letter

Ⱪ
- Ⱪ ⱪ

Usage
- Writing system: Latin script
- Type: Alphabetic
- Language of origin: Uyghur language
- Sound values: [q]
- In Unicode: U+2C69, U+2C6A

History
Development
D46
      - Κ κ ϰ
        - 𐌊
          - K
            - Ⱪ ⱪ
- Time period: 1926 to present

Other
- Writing direction: Left-to-right

The Latin letter K with descender (capital: Ⱪ, minuscule: ⱪ; sometimes falsely rendered as k̡ or ķ) is a Latin letter.

The letter is very easily confused with the Cyrillic letter ka with descender (Қ), which is encoded differently in Unicode, even though it essentially shares the same letter forms.

This Latin letter has been used in China for writing the Uighur language with the former Pinyin-derived “new script” alphabet (UPNY), borrowing the letter form from the Cyrillic letter (and in the past, the same fonts used for writing Uyghur in the Cyrillic script have been used for writing it in the Latin script), until that alphabet was deprecated and the language was converted back to use the Arabic alphabet (and then a newer Uyghur Latin alphabet was created using the Latin letter Q instead for romanisations).

This letter was included in a 75-letter Latin script for the Abkhaz language devised by a Russian/Georgian linguist Nikolai Marr that lasted for 2 years 1926–1928 (during the Latinisation campaign). It represented the velar ejective.
