= Schwa (Cyrillic) =

Cyrillic letter used in various languages

- Ә ә

Usage
- Writing system: Cyrillic
- Type: Alphabetic
- Sound values: [æ] [ɤ] [ə] [ɛ~a] [◌ʷ]

Schwa (Ә ә; italics: Ә ә) is a letter of the Cyrillic script, derived from the Latin letter schwa. It is used in Abkhaz, Bashkir, Dungan, Itelmen, Kalmyk, Kazakh, Khanty, Kurdish, Uyghur and Tatar. It was also used in Azeri (still used by Azeri speakers in Dagestan), Karakalpak, and Turkmen before those languages switched to the Latin alphabet. The Azeri and some other Latin-derived alphabets contain a letter of identical appearance (Ə/ə).

== Usage ==
=== Turkic languages ===
In many Turkic languages such as Azerbaijani, Tatar, Kazakh,, Bashkir, and Uyghur, as well as Mongolic languages (e.g., Kalmyk), and Khinalug in the Caucasus, it represents the near-open front unrounded vowel /æ/, like the pronunciation of ⟨a⟩ in "cat". It is often transliterated as ⟨ä⟩.

=== Dungan ===
In Dungan, it represents the close-mid back unrounded vowel /ɤ/.

=== Kurdish ===
In Kurdish, it represents the sound /ε~æ/.

=== Abkhaz ===
In Abkhaz, it is a modifier letter, which represents labialization of the preceding consonant /ʷ/. Digraphs with ⟨ә⟩ are treated as letters and given separate positions in the Abkhaz alphabet, usually immediately after the letter that the schwa combines with. The digraphs with ⟨ә⟩ in Abkhaz are: ⟨Гә⟩, ⟨Ҕә⟩, ⟨Дә⟩, ⟨Жә⟩, ⟨Ӡә⟩, ⟨Кә⟩, ⟨Қә⟩, ⟨Ҟә⟩, ⟨Тә⟩, ⟨Ҭә⟩, ⟨Хә⟩, ⟨Ҳә⟩, ⟨Цә⟩, ⟨Ҵә⟩, and ⟨Шә⟩. It is transliterated into Latin as either a superscript w: ⟨ʷ⟩.

=== Khanty alphabets ===
In 2013, Khanty alphabets represents it as the reduced mid central vowel /ə/.

== Related letters and other similar characters ==
- Ӛ ӛ: Cyrillic Schwa with diaeresis
- Ä ä: Latin letter A with diaeresis
- Ӓ ӓ: Cyrillic letter A with diaeresis
- Æ æ: Ligature Æ, an Icelandic, Danish and Norwegian letter.
- Ӕ ӕ: Cyrillic letter Æ
- Ə ə: Latin schwa, used to transliterate Azerbaijani's Cyrillic schwa and 1927—1940 Turkmen's schwa. (Now ä for a schwa in Cyrillic)

== Computer codes ==
Character information
Preview	Ә		ә	
Unicode name	CYRILLIC CAPITAL LETTER SCHWA		CYRILLIC SMALL LETTER SCHWA	
Encodings	decimal	hex	dec	hex
Unicode	1240	U+04D8	1241	U+04D9
UTF-8	211 152	D3 98	211 153	D3 99
Numeric character reference	&#1240;	&#x4D8;	&#1241;	&#x4D9;
