= Sh (digraph) =

Digraph of the Latin alphabet

Sh digraph

The digraph sh in the Latin alphabet is written as a combination of S and H.

== European languages ==
=== Albanian ===
In Albanian, sh represents [ʃ]. It is considered a distinct letter, named shë, and placed between S and T in the Albanian alphabet.

=== Breton ===
In Breton, sh represents [s]. It is not considered a distinct letter and it is a variety of zh (e. g. koshoc'h ("older"). It is not considered as a digraph in compound words, such as kroashent ("roundabout": kroaz ("cross") + hent ("way", "ford").

=== English ===
In English, ⟨sh⟩ usually represents /ʃ/. The main exception is in compound words, where the ⟨s⟩ and ⟨h⟩ are not a digraph, but pronounced separately, e.g. hogshead is hogs-head /ˈhɒɡz.hɛd/, not *hog-shead /ˈhɒɡ.ʃɛd/. Sh is not considered a distinct letter for collation purposes.

American Literary braille includes a single-cell contraction for the digraph with the dot pattern (1 4 6). In isolation it stands for the word "shall".

In Old English orthography, the sound /ʃ/ was written ⟨sc⟩. In Middle English it came to be written ⟨sch⟩ or ⟨sh⟩; the latter spelling has been adopted as the usual one in Modern English.

=== Finnish and Estonian ===
In Finnish and Estonian, sh is used in place of š to represent [ʃ] when the accented character is unavailable.

=== Irish ===
In Irish, ⟨sh⟩ represents [h] and marks the lenition of ⟨s⟩; for example mo shaol [mˠə hiːlˠ] "my life" (cf. saol [sˠiːlˠ] "life").

=== Ladino ===
In Judaeo-Spanish, sh represents [ʃ] and occurs in both native words (debasho, ‘under’) and foreign ones (shalom, ‘hello’). In the Hebrew script it is written ש.

=== Occitan ===
In Occitan, sh represents [ʃ]. It mostly occurs in the Gascon dialect of Occitan and corresponds with s or ss in other Occitan dialects: peish = peis "fish", naishença = naissença "birth", sheis = sièis "six". An i before sh is silent: peish, naishença are pronounced [ˈpeʃ, naˈʃensɔ]. Some words have sh in all Occitan dialects: they are Gascon words adopted in all the Occitan language (Aush "Auch", Arcaishon "Arcachon") or foreign borrowings (shampó "shampoo").

For s·h, see Interpunct#Occitan.

=== Spanish ===
In Spanish, sh represents [ʃ] almost only in foreign origin words, as flash, show, shuara or geisha. Royal Spanish Academy recommends adapting in both spelling and pronunciation with s, adapting to common pronunciation in peninsular dialect. Nevertheless, in American dialects it is frequently pronounced [t͡ʃ].

== Other languages ==
=== Somali ===
Sh represents the sound [ʃ] in the Somali Latin Alphabet. It is considered a separate letter, and is the 9th letter of the alphabet.

=== Uyghur ===
Sh represents the sound [ʃ] in the Uyghur Latin script. It is considered a separate letter, and is the 14th letter of the alphabet.

=== Uzbek ===
In Uzbek, the letter sh represents [ʃ]. It is the 27th letter of the Uzbek alphabet. It is to be replaced by ş in April 2027.

== Romanization ==
In various romanizations of Standard Chinese, including pinyin and Wade-Giles, sh represents the voiceless retroflex fricative [ʂ].

In the Hepburn romanization of Japanese, sh represents [ɕ]. Other romanizations write [ɕ] as s before i and sy before other vowels.

== International auxiliary languages ==
=== Ido ===
In Ido, sh represents [ʃ].
