= H =

Eighth letter of the Latin alphabet

- H h

Usage
- Writing system: Latin script
- Type: Alphabetic
- Language of origin: Latin language
- Sound values: [h]; [x]; [χ]; [ħ]; [∅]; [ɦ]; [ɥ]; [ʜ]; [ʔ]; [◌ʰ]; [ç]
- In Unicode: U+0048, U+0068
- Alphabetical position: 8

History
Development
O6N24V28
    - 𐤇
      - 𐌇
        - Η
          - H h
- Time period: c. 700 BCE to present
- Descendants: Ħ; Ƕ; Ⱶ; Ꟶ; Һ; ʰ; h; ħ; $\mathbb{H}$
- Sisters: И; ח; ح; ܚ; ࠇ; 𐎅; 𐎈; Հ հ

Other
- Associated graphs: h(x), ch, gh, nh, ph, sh, ſh, th, wh, (x)h
- Writing direction: Left-to-right

H (minuscule: h) is the eighth letter of the Latin alphabet, used in the modern English alphabet, including the alphabets of other Western European languages and others worldwide. Its name in English is aitch (pronounced /eɪtʃ/, plural aitches), or regionally haitch (pronounced /heɪtʃ/, plural haitches).

== Name ==
=== English ===
For most English speakers, the name for the letter is pronounced as /eɪtʃ/ and spelled "aitch" or occasionally "eitch". The pronunciation /heɪtʃ/ and the associated spelling "haitch" are often considered to be h-adding and are considered non-standard in England. It is, however, a feature of Hiberno-English, and occurs sporadically in various other dialects.

The perceived name of the letter affects the choice of indefinite article before initialisms beginning with H: for example "an H-bomb" or "a H-bomb". The pronunciation /heɪtʃ/ may be a hypercorrection formed by analogy with the names of the other letters of the alphabet, most of which include the sound they represent.

The haitch pronunciation of h has spread in England, being used by approximately 24% of English people born since 1982, and polls continue to show this pronunciation becoming more common among younger native speakers. Despite this increasing number, the pronunciation without the /h/ sound is still considered standard in England, although the pronunciation with /h/ is also attested as a legitimate variant. In Northern Ireland, the pronunciation of the letter has been used as a shibboleth, with Catholics typically pronouncing it with the /h/ and Protestants pronouncing the letter without it.

Authorities disagree about the history of the letter's name. The Oxford English Dictionary says the original name of the letter was [ˈaha] in Latin; this became [ˈaka] in Vulgar Latin, passed into English via Old French [atʃ], and by Middle English was pronounced [aːtʃ]. The American Heritage Dictionary of the English Language derives it from French hache from Latin haca or hic. Anatoly Liberman suggests a conflation of two obsolete orderings of the alphabet, one with H immediately followed by K and the other without any K: reciting the former's ..., H, K, L,... as [...(h)a ka el ...] when reinterpreted for the latter ..., H, L,... would imply a pronunciation of [(h)a ka] for H.

=== Other languages ===
- French: ache [aʃ]
- German: ha [haː]
- Portuguese: agá/hagá [ɐˈɣa, aˈɡa]
- Spanish: hache ['atʃe]
- Italian: acca [ˈakːa]
- Danish, Norwegian and Swedish: hå [ˈho]
- Polish: ha [ˈxa]
- Czech: ha [ˈɦa]

== History ==
| Egyptian hieroglyph fence | Proto-Sinaitic ḥaṣr | Phoenician Heth | Western Greek Heta | Etruscan H | Latin H |
|---|---|---|---|---|---|
| N24 | | | | | Latin H |

The original Semitic letter Heth most likely represented the voiceless pharyngeal fricative (ħ). The form of the letter probably stood for a fence or post.

The Greek Eta 'Η' in archaic Greek alphabets, before coming to represent a long vowel, /ɛː/, still represented a similar sound, the voiceless glottal fricative /h/. In this context, the letter eta is also known as Heta. Thus, in the Old Italic alphabets, the letter Heta of the Euboean alphabet was adopted with its original sound value /h/.

While Etruscan and Latin had /h/ as a phoneme, almost all Romance languages lost the sound—Romanian later re-borrowed the /h/ phoneme from its neighbouring Slavic languages, and Spanish developed a secondary /h/ from /f/, before losing it again; various Spanish dialects have developed [h] as an allophone of /s/ or /x/ in most Spanish-speaking countries, and various dialects of Portuguese use it as an allophone of /ʁ/. 'H' is also used in many spelling systems in digraphs and trigraphs, such as 'ch', which represents /tʃ/ in Spanish, Galician, and Old Portuguese; /ʃ/ in French and modern Portuguese; /k/ in Italian and French.

== Use in writing systems ==
Pronunciation of ⟨h⟩ by language
| Orthography | Phonemes |
|---|---|
| Standard Chinese (Pinyin) | /x/ |
| Czech | /ɦ/ |
| English | /h/, silent |
| French | silent |
| German | /h/, silent |
| Polish | /x/ |
| Portuguese | silent |
| Spanish | silent |
| Turkish | /h/ |

=== English ===
In English, ⟨h⟩ occurs as a single-letter grapheme (being either silent or representing the voiceless glottal fricative /h/ and in various digraphs:

- ⟨ch⟩ representing /tʃ/, /ʃ/, /k/, or /x/
- ⟨gh⟩ being silent or representing /ɡ/, /k/, /p/, or /f/
- ⟨ph⟩ representing /f/
- ⟨rh⟩ representing /r/
- ⟨sh⟩ representing /ʃ/
- ⟨th⟩ representing /θ/ or /ð/
- ⟨wh⟩ representing /hw/ or /h/

The letter is silent in a syllable rime, as in ah, ohm, dahlia, cheetah, and pooh-poohed, as well as in certain other words (mostly of French origin) such as hour, honest, herb, and vehicle (in American but not British English). Initial /h/ is often not pronounced in the weak form of some function words, including had, has, have, he, her, him, his, and in some varieties of English (including most regional dialects of England and Wales), it is often omitted in all words. It was formerly common for an rather than a to be used as the indefinite article before a word beginning with /h/ in an unstressed syllable, as in "an historian", but the use of a is now more usual.

In English, the pronunciation of ⟨h⟩ as /h/ can be analyzed as a voiceless vowel. That is, when the phoneme /h/ precedes a vowel, /h/ may be realized as a voiceless version of the subsequent vowel. For example, the word ⟨hit⟩, /hɪt/ is realized as [ɪ̥ɪt].

H is the eighth most frequently used letter in the English language (after S, N, I, O, A, T, and E), with a frequency of about 6.1% in words.

=== Other languages ===
In German, following a vowel, it often silently indicates that the vowel is long: In the word erhöhen ('heighten'), the second ⟨h⟩ is mute for most speakers outside of Switzerland. In 1901, a spelling reform eliminated the silent ⟨h⟩ in nearly all instances of ⟨th⟩ in native German words such as thun ('to do') or Thür ('door'). It has been left unchanged in words derived from Greek, such as Theater ('theater') and Thron ('throne'), which continue to be spelled with ⟨th⟩ even after the last German spelling reform.

In Spanish and Portuguese, ⟨h⟩ is a silent letter with no pronunciation, as in hijo [ˈixo] ('son') and húngaro [ˈũɡaɾu] ('Hungarian'). The spelling reflects an earlier pronunciation of the sound /h/. In words where the ⟨h⟩ is derived from a Latin /f/, it is still sometimes pronounced with the value [h] in some regions of Andalusia, Extremadura, Canarias, Cantabria, and the Americas. Some words beginning with [je] or [we], such as hielo, 'ice' and huevo, 'egg', were given an initial ⟨h⟩ to avoid confusion between their initial semivowels and the consonants ⟨j⟩ and ⟨v⟩. This is because ⟨j⟩ and ⟨v⟩ used to be considered variants of ⟨i⟩ and ⟨u⟩ respectively. ⟨h⟩ also appears in the digraph ⟨ch⟩, which represents /tʃ/ in Spanish and northern Portugal, and /ʃ/ in varieties that have merged both sounds (the latter originally represented by ⟨x⟩ instead), such as most of the Portuguese language and some Spanish dialects, prominently Chilean Spanish.

French orthography classifies words that begin with this letter in two ways, one of which can affect the pronunciation, even though it is a silent letter either way. The H muet, or "mute" ⟨h⟩, is considered as though the letter were not there at all. For example, the singular definite article le or la, which is elided to l' before a vowel, elides before an H muet followed by a vowel. For example, le + hébergement becomes l'hébergement ('the accommodation'). The other kind of ⟨h⟩ is called h aspiré ("aspirated '⟨h⟩'", though it is not normally aspirated phonetically), and does not allow elision or liaison. For example, in le homard ('the lobster') the article le remains unelided, and may be separated from the noun with a bit of a glottal stop. Most words that begin with an H muet come from Latin (honneur, homme) or from Greek through Latin (hécatombe), whereas most words beginning with an H aspiré come from Germanic (harpe, hareng) or non-Indo-European languages (harem, hamac, haricot); in some cases, an orthographic ⟨h⟩ was added to disambiguate the [v] and semivowel [ɥ] pronunciations before the introduction of the distinction between the letters ⟨v⟩ and ⟨u⟩: huit (from uit, ultimately from Latin octo), huître (from uistre, ultimately from Greek through Latin ostrea).

In Italian, ⟨h⟩ has no phonological value. Its most important uses are in the digraphs 'ch' /k/ and 'gh' /ɡ/, as well as to differentiate the spellings of certain short words that are homophones, for example, some present tense forms of the verb avere ('to have') (such as hanno, 'they have', vs. anno, 'year'), and in short interjections (oh, ehi).

Some languages, including Czech, Slovak, Hungarian, Finnish, and Estonian, use ⟨h⟩ as a breathy voiced glottal fricative [ɦ], often as an allophone of otherwise voiceless /h/ in a voiced environment.

In Hungarian, the letter represents a phoneme /h/ with four allophones: [h] before vowels, [ɦ] between two vowels, [ç] after front vowels, and [x] word-finally after back vowels. It can also be a silent word-finally after back vowels. It is [xː] when geminated. In archaic spelling, the digraph ⟨ch⟩ represents /t͡ʃ/ (as in the name Széchenyi) and /h/ (as in pech, which is pronounced [pɛxː]); in certain environments it breaks palatalization of a consonant, as in the name Beöthy, which is pronounced [bøːti] (without the intervening h, the name Beöty could be pronounced [bøːc]); and finally, it acts as a silent component of a digraph, as in the name Vargha, pronounced [vɒrgɒ].

In Ukrainian and Belarusian, when written in the Latin alphabet, ⟨h⟩ is also commonly used for /ɦ/, which is otherwise written with the Cyrillic letter ⟨г⟩.

In Irish, ⟨h⟩ is not considered an independent letter, except for a very few non-native words; however, ⟨h⟩ placed after a consonant is known as a "séimhiú" and indicates the lenition of that consonant; ⟨h⟩ began to replace the original form of a séimhiú, a dot placed above the consonant, after the introduction of typewriters.

In most dialects of Polish, both ⟨h⟩ and the digraph ⟨ch⟩ always represent /x/.

In Basque, during the 20th century, it was not used in the orthography of the Basque dialects in Spain but it marked an aspiration in the North-Eastern dialects. During the standardization of Basque in the 1970s, a compromise was reached that h would be accepted if it were the first consonant in a syllable. Hence, herri ("people") and etorri ("to come") were accepted instead of erri (Biscayan) and ethorri (Souletin).

=== Other systems ===
As a phonetic symbol in the International Phonetic Alphabet (IPA), it is used mainly for the so-called aspirations (fricative or trills), and variations of the plain letter are used to represent two sounds: the lowercase form ⟨h⟩ represents the voiceless glottal fricative, and the small capital form ⟨ʜ⟩ represents the voiceless epiglottal fricative (or trill). With a bar, minuscule ⟨ħ⟩ is used for a voiceless pharyngeal fricative. Specific to the IPA, a hooked ⟨ɦ⟩ is used for a voiced glottal fricative, and a superscript ⟨ʰ⟩ is used to represent aspiration.

== Other uses ==
- Unit prefix h, meaning 100 times.

== Related characters ==
=== Descendants and related characters in the Latin alphabet ===
- H with diacritics: Ĥ ĥ Ȟ ȟ Ħ ħ Ḩ ḩ Ⱨ ⱨ ẖ ẖ Ḥ ḥ Ḣ ḣ Ḧ ḧ Ḫ ḫ ꞕ Ꜧ ꜧ
- IPA-specific symbols related to H: ʜ ɦ ʰ ʱ ɥ ᶣ ɧ
- Superscript IPA symbols related to H: 𐞖 𐞕
- ꟸ: Modifier letter capital H with stroke is used in VoQS to represent faucalized voice.
- ᴴ : Modifier letter H is used in the Uralic Phonetic Alphabet
- ₕ : Subscript small h was used in the Uralic Phonetic Alphabet prior to its formal standardization in 1902
- ʰ : Modifier letter small h is used in Indo-European studies
- ʮ and ʯ : Turned H with fishhook and turned H with fishhook and tail are used in Sino-Tibetanist linguistics
- Ƕ ƕ : Latin letter hwair, derived from a ligature of the digraph hv, and used to transliterate the Gothic letter 𐍈 (which represented the sound [hʷ])
- Ⱶ ⱶ : Claudian letters
- Ꟶ ꟶ : Reversed half h used in Roman inscriptions from the Roman provinces of Gaul

=== Ancestors, siblings, and descendants in other alphabets ===
- 𐤇 : Semitic letter Heth, from which the following symbols derive:
  - Η η : Greek letter Eta, from which the following symbols derive:
    - 𐌇 : Old Italic H, the ancestor of modern Latin H
      - ᚺ, ᚻ : Runic letter haglaz, which is probably a descendant of Old Italic H
    - Һ һ : Cyrillic letter Shha, which derives from Latin H
    - И и : Cyrillic letter И, which derives from the Greek letter Eta
    - 𐌷 : Gothic letter haal
    - Armenian letter ho (Հ)

=== Derived signs, symbols, and abbreviations ===
- h : Planck constant
- ℏ : reduced Planck constant
- $\mathbb{H}$ : Blackboard bold capital H used in quaternion notation

== Other representations ==
=== Computing ===
Character information
| Preview | H | | h | | Ｈ | | ｈ | |
|---|---|---|---|---|---|---|---|---|
| Unicode name | LATIN CAPITAL LETTER H | | LATIN SMALL LETTER H | | FULLWIDTH LATIN CAPITAL LETTER H | | FULLWIDTH LATIN SMALL LETTER H | |
| Encodings | decimal | hex | dec | hex | dec | hex | dec | hex |
| Unicode | 72 | U+0048 | 104 | U+0068 | 65320 | U+FF28 | 65352 | U+FF48 |
| UTF-8 | 72 | 48 | 104 | 68 | 239 188 168 | EF BC A8 | 239 189 136 | EF BD 88 |
| Numeric character reference | &#72; | &#x48; | &#104; | &#x68; | &#65320; | &#xFF28; | &#65352; | &#xFF48; |
| EBCDIC family | 200 | C8 | 136 | 88 | | | | |
| ASCII ^{1} | 72 | 48 | 104 | 68 | | | | |

^{1} Also for encodings based on ASCII, including the DOS, Windows, ISO-8859, and Macintosh families of encodings.

=== Other ===
| NATO phonetic | Morse code |
| Hotel | ▄ ▄ ▄ ▄ |

Signal flag

Flag semaphore
American manual alphabet (ASL fingerspelling)
British manual alphabet (BSL fingerspelling)
Braille dots-125
Unified English Braille

== See also ==
- Handshape
  - American Sign Language grammar
- List of Egyptian hieroglyphs#H
