= Uyghur Arabic alphabet =

Arabic alphabet for the Uyghur language

Uyghur alphabet ئۇيغۇر يېزىقى
- Example of writing in the Uyghur alphabet: Uyghur
- Script type: Alphabet
- Languages: Uyghur, Sarikoli

Related scripts
- Parent systems: Proto-Sinaitic: Phoenician; Aramaic; Nabataean; Arabic; Perso-Arabic; Uyghur alphabet

Unicode
- Unicode range: U+0600 to U+06FF U+0750 to U+077F; U+FB50 to U+FDFF U+FE70 to U+FEFF

The Uyghur Arabic alphabet (Uyghur: ئۇيغۇر ئەرەب يېزىقى, romanized: Uyghur Ereb Yëziqi, abbr. UEY) is a version of the Arabic script used for writing the Uyghur language, primarily by Uyghurs living in Xinjiang Uyghur Autonomous Region. It is one of several Uyghur alphabets and has been the official alphabet of the Uyghur language since 1982.

The first Perso-Arabic derived alphabet for Uyghur was developed in the 10th century, when Islam was introduced there. The alphabet was used for writing the Chagatai language, the regional literary language, and is now known as the Chagatay alphabet (Uyghur: كونا يېزىق, romanized: Kona Yëziq, lit. 'old script'). It was used nearly exclusively up to the early 1920s. This alphabet did not represent Uyghur vowels and according to Robert Barkley Shaw, spelling was irregular and long vowel letters were frequently written for short vowels since most Turki speakers were unsure of the difference between long and short vowels. The pre-modification alphabet used Arabic diacritics (zabar, zer and pesh) to mark short vowels. Also, the ة was used to represent a short [a] by some Turki writers.

Alternative Uyghur scripts then began emerging and collectively largely displaced Chagatai. Between 1937 and 1954, the Perso-Arabic alphabet used to write Uyghur was modified by removing redundant letters and adding markings for vowels. The Uyghur Cyrillic alphabet was introduced around 1937, and the Latin-based Uyghur New Script in 1958. The modern Uyghur Perso-Arabic alphabet was made official in 1978 and reinstituted by the Chinese government in 1983, with modifications for representing Uyghur vowels.

The reformed modern Uyghur Arabic alphabet eliminated letters whose sounds were found only in Arabic. Instead, it spells Arabic and Persian loanwords — such as Islamic religious words — based on their Uyghur pronunciation and not on their original Arabic or Persian spelling.

== Current official alphabet ==
The table below lists all 32 letters of the current official Uyghur alphabet used in Xinjiang in alphabetical order, along with their IPA transcriptions.

Current Official Uyghur Arabic Alphabet
| No. | Letter | IPA | No. | Letter | IPA |
|---|---|---|---|---|---|
| 1 | ئا | /ɑ/ | 17 | ق | /q/ |
| 2 | ئە | /æ/ | 18 | ك | /k/ |
| 3 | ب | /b/ | 19 | گ | /ɡ/ |
| 4 | پ | /p/ | 20 | ڭ | /ŋ/ |
| 5 | ت | /t/ | 21 | ل | /l/ |
| 6 | ج | /d͡ʒ/ | 22 | م | /m/ |
| 7 | چ | /t͡ʃ/ | 23 | ن | /n/ |
| 8 | خ | /χ/ | 24 | ھ | /h/ |
| 9 | د | /d/ | 25 | ئو | /o/ |
| 10 | ر | /r/ | 26 | ئۇ | /u/ |
| 11 | ز | /z/ | 27 | ئۆ | /ø/ |
| 12 | ژ | /ʒ/ | 28 | ئۈ | /ʏ/ |
| 13 | س | /s/ | 29 | ۋ | /v/~/w/ |
| 14 | ش | /ʃ/ | 30 | ئې | /e/ |
| 15 | غ | /ʁ/ | 31 | ئى | /ɪ/~/ɯ/ |
| 16 | ف | /f/ | 32 | ي | /j/ |

Note: ئ also represents /ʔ/ but it is usually ignored at the beginning of words. It still reads /ʔ/ in the middle, such as سائەت /sɑʔæt/ hour.

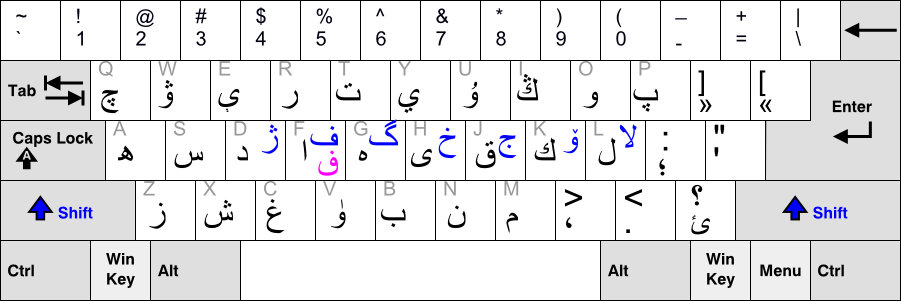
MS Windows Uyghur keyboard layout. Note that vowels are composed of pairs of Arabic letters, starting by an alif with hamza, that must be entered separately on this keyboard before the actual vowel. In fact, the keyboard is based on the older Latin alphabet used for Uyghur New Script and does not allow entering all vowels correctly for the current Arabic alphabet.

In printed texts, the letter ف may also take the shape of ق with a single dot, that is U+06A7 ڧ ARABIC LETTER QAF WITH DOT ABOVE. This letter was used in the Uyghur keyboard layout for Windows Vista and Windows Server 2008, but Windows 7 and Windows Server 2008 R2 changed the mapping to U+0641 ف ARABIC LETTER FEH.. In the digital sphere, U+0641 ف is prevalent, and some fonts specialized for Uyghur map the shape of ڧ to U+0641 ف .

== Spelling of suffixes ==
Uyghur spelling borrowed heavily from Chagatai influences. The spelling of the suffixes from Uyghur also matched Chagatai spellings which were kept largely static. Below is an incomplete list of suffixed spellings and their vowel harmony alternatives. Frequently, some Chagatai suffixes were not written joined (separated by a zero width non-joiner, in Unicode terms) while in modern Uyghur the root+suffix would be joined.

Chagatai/Uyghur suffix structure
| Part of speech | IPA | UEY | UEY Example | Traditional Spelling | Traditional Example |
|---|---|---|---|---|---|
| Plural Suffix | /-lær/ | لەر | ئۆردەك + لەر = ئۆردەكلەر | لار | اوردک + لار = اوردکلار |
| Plural Suffix | /-lɑr/ | لار | قۇش + لار = قۇشلار | لار | قوش + لار = قوشلار |

== Historical spellings ==
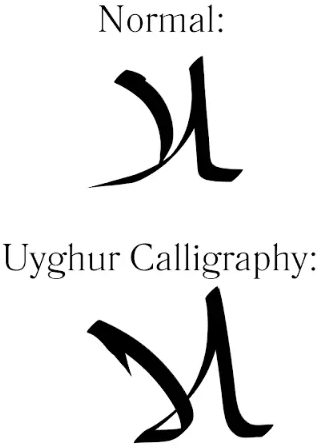
An Uyghur Lam-Alif is rare

Alphabetical order for the traditional Perso-Arabic Script (Kona Yëziq) used before the 1950s
| Letter | ا | ب | پ | ت | ث | ج | چ | ح | خ | د | ذ | ر | ز | س | ش | ص |
| ULY | a | b | p | t | s | j | ch | h | x | d | z | r | z | s | sh | s |
| Letter | ض | ط | ظ | ع | غ | ف | ق | ک | گ | ݣ | ل | م | ن | و | ه | ى |
| ULY | z | t | z | | gh | f | q | k | g | ng | l | m | n | w, o, u | h | y, e, i |

Vowel marks used for the traditional Perso-Arabic Script before the 1950s
| Mark | ـَ | ـِ | ـُ |
| Name | zabar | zer | pesh |
| Letter | ا | ي | و |
| Name | alif | ye | wáo |

== Old and modern spelling comparisons ==
| Old Perso-Arabic alphabet (Kona Yëziq) used before the 1950s | Modern Uyghur Arabic alphabet | Latin | Meaning |
|---|---|---|---|
| بغرا | بۇغرا | bughra | bull camel |
| ارسلان | ئارىسلان | arislan | lion |
| سلطان | سۇلتان | sultan | sultan |
| يوسف | يۈسۈپ | Yüsüp | Yusuf |
| حسن | ھەسەن | Hesen | Hassan |
| خلق | خەلق | xelq | people |
| كافر | كاپىر | kapir | infidel |
| مسلمان | مۇسۇلمان | musulman | Muslim |
| منافق | مۇناپىق | munapiq | hypocrite |
| اسلام | ئىسلام | Islam | Islam |
| دين | دىن | din | religion |
| كاشقر | قەشقەر | Qeshqer | Kashgar |
| ختن | خوتەن | Xoten | Khotan |
| ينگي حصار | يېڭىسار | Yëngisar | Yangi Hissar |
| ساريق قول | سارىقول | Sariqol | Sarikol |
| قيرغيز | قىرغىز | Qirghiz | Kirghiz |
| دولان | دولان | Dolan | Dolan people |
| كوندوز | كۈندۈز | kündüz | day-time |
| ساريغ or ساريق | سېرىق | seriq | yellow |
| مارالباشي | مارالبېشى | Maralbëshi | Maralbexi County |
| لونگي | لۇنگى | Lungi | Lungi |
| آلتی شهر | ئالتە شەھەر | Alte sheher | Altishahr |
| آفاق خواجه | ئاپاق خوجا | Apaq Xoja | Afaq Khoja |
| پيچاق | پىچاق | pichaq | knife |
