= Shha =

Cyrillic letter

Ha/He (Shha)
- Һ һ

Usage
- Writing system: Cyrillic
- Type: Alphabetic
- Sound values: /h/, /ħ/, /ʰ/, /ɣ/

History
- Development: H h: Һ һ

Ha or He (Shha in Unicode) (Һ һ; italics: Һ һ) is a letter of the Cyrillic script. Its form is derived from the Latin letter H (H h h), but the capital forms are more similar to a rotated Cyrillic letter Che (Ч ч) or a stroke-less Tshe (Ћ ћ) because the Cyrillic letter En (Н н) already has the same form as the Latin letter H.

Most of the languages using the letter call it ha - the name shha was created when the letter was encoded in Unicode, as the name ha was already taken by Kha. (Х х)

Shha often represents the voiceless glottal fricative /h/, like the pronunciation of ⟨h⟩ in "hat"; and is used in the alphabets of the following languages:

Language	Notes	Phoneme
Azerbaijani	1939–1991, now uses a Latin alphabet (Still used by Dagestan)	/h/, /ħ/
Bashkir		/h/
Buryat		/h/
Dolgan		/h/
Kalmyk		/ɣ/
Kazakh	Only used in Arabic, Persian loanwords and some exceptions	/h/
Kildin Sami	Also represented by the modifier letter apostrophe (ʼ)	/◌ʰ/
Kurdish		/h/
Tatar		/h/
Suret (Assyrian)	Used in the Soviet Cyrillic script, which was used before 1930 and after 1938 (exact adoption and abandoning of the Cyrillic script is unknown). Was also be used to represent the voiced velar fricative because at the time, there was no letter to represent that sound.	/h/, /ɣ/
Yakut		/h/

== Computing codes ==
Character information
Preview	Һ		һ	
Unicode name	CYRILLIC CAPITAL LETTER SHHA		CYRILLIC SMALL LETTER SHHA	
Encodings	decimal	hex	dec	hex
Unicode	1210	U+04BA	1211	U+04BB
UTF-8	210 186	D2 BA	210 187	D2 BB
Numeric character reference	&#1210;	&#x4BA;	&#1211;	&#x4BB;

== See also ==
- - Shha with hook
- Ԧ ԧ - Shha with descender
