= Uyghur New Script =

Obsolete Latin alphabet for the Uyghur language

Uyghur name
- Uyghur: ئۇيغۇر يېڭى يېزىقى
Transcriptions
- Latin Yëziqi: Uyghur Yëngi Yëziqi
- Yengi Yeziⱪ: Uyƣur Yengi Yeziⱪi
- SASM/GNC: Uyĝur Yêngi Yêzik̂i
- Siril Yëziqi: Уйғур Йеңи Йезиқи

Chinese name
- Simplified Chinese: 维吾尔新文字
- Traditional Chinese: 維吾爾新文字
Transcriptions
Standard Mandarin
- Hanyu Pinyin: Wéiwú'ěr Xīn Wénzì

The Uyghur New Script (Uyghur: Uyƣur Yengi Yeziⱪi, Arabic alphabet: ئۇيغۇر يېڭى يېزىقى) is a Latin alphabet with both Uniform Turkic Alphabet and Pinyin influence, used for writing the Uyghur language between 1965 and 1982, primarily by Uyghurs living in China.

It was devised around 1959 and was intended to replace the Uyghur Cyrillic alphabet, which had also been used in China after the proclamation of the People's Republic of China in 1949. It is still an official alphabet in China, but after the reintroduction of the Arabic alphabet in 1982, there has been a significant decline in its use and the majority of Uyghurs today use the Arabic script. For romanized Uyghur, the ISO/IEC 8859-1 compliant Uyghur Latin alphabet has become more common than the New Script. The letters in the Uyghur New Script are, in order:

Majuscule	Minuscule	IPA
A	a	ɑ, a
B	b	b
C	c	ts
D	d	d
E	e	e
F	f	f, ɸ
G	g	ɡ
H	h	χ, x
I	i	i, ɨ
J	j	dʒ
K	k	k
L	l	l
M	m	m
N	n	n
O	o	o, ɔ
P	p	p
Q	q	tʃ
R	r	r, ɾ
S	s	s
T	t	t
U	u	u, ʊ
V	v	w, v
W	w	w, v
X	x	ʃ
Y	y	j
Z	z	z
Ƣ	ƣ	ʁ, ɣ
Ⱨ	ⱨ	h, ɦ
Ⱪ	ⱪ	q
Ə	ə	ɛ, æ
Ɵ	ɵ	ø
Ü	ü	y, ʏ
Ⱬ	ⱬ	ʒ
NG	ng	ŋ
ZH	zh	dʒ
CH	ch	tʃ
SH	sh	ʃ
