= Yarkant County =

Yarkant County: يەكەن ناھىيىسى (Uyghur); 莎车县 (Chinese); Yarkand, Yakan, Shache
- County
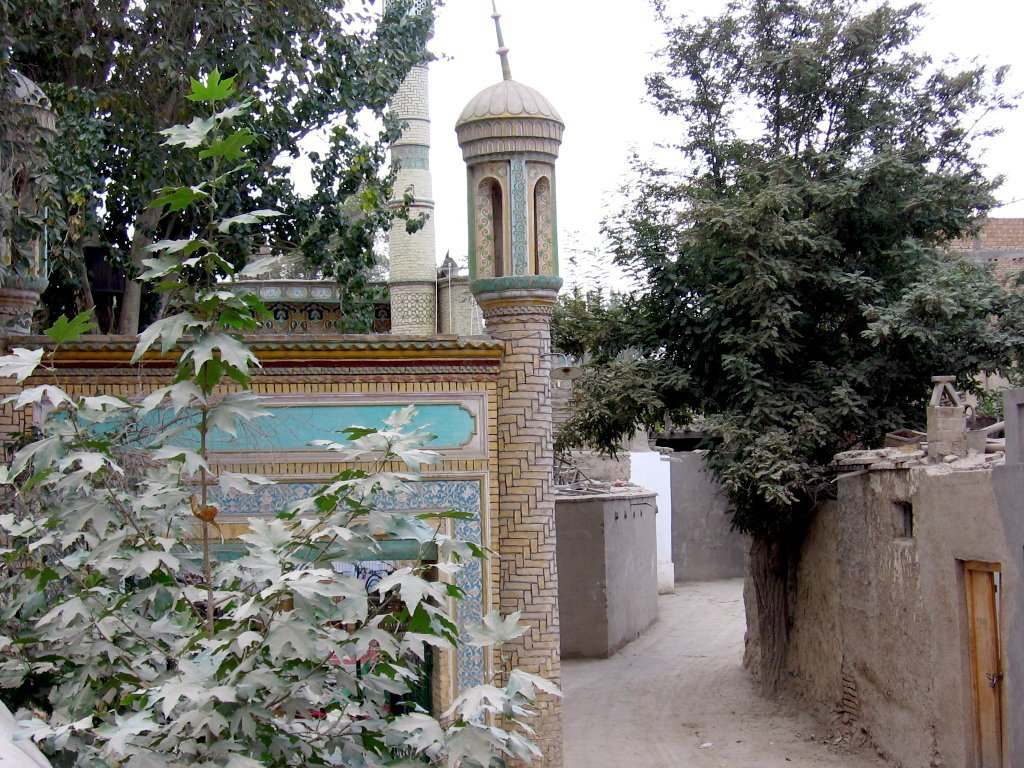
- A street in Yarkant

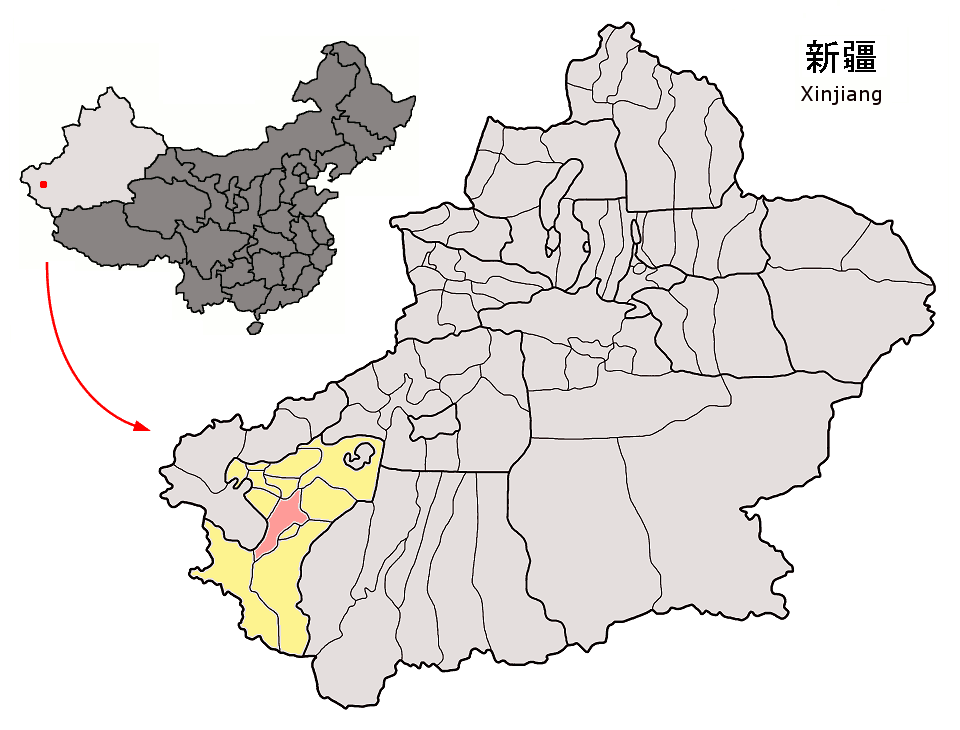
- Yarkant County (red) within Kashgar Prefecture (yellow) and Xinjiang

- Location of the seat in Xinjiang Yarkant (China)
- Coordinates (County government): 38°23′27″N 77°13′24″E
- Country: China
- Region: Xinjiang
- Prefecture: Kashgar
- County seat: Yakan

Area
  - Total: 8,969 km^{2} (3,463 sq mi)
- Elevation: 1,232 m (4,042 ft)

Population (2020)
  - Total: 860,800
  - Density: 95.98/km^{2} (248.6/sq mi)

Ethnic groups
  - Major ethnic groups: Uyghur
- Time zone: UTC+8 (China Standard (Note: Locals in Xinjiang frequently observe UTC+6 (Xinjiang Time), 2 hours behind Beijing.))
- Postal code: 844700
- Website: www.shache.gov.cn

Yarkant (Shache) County
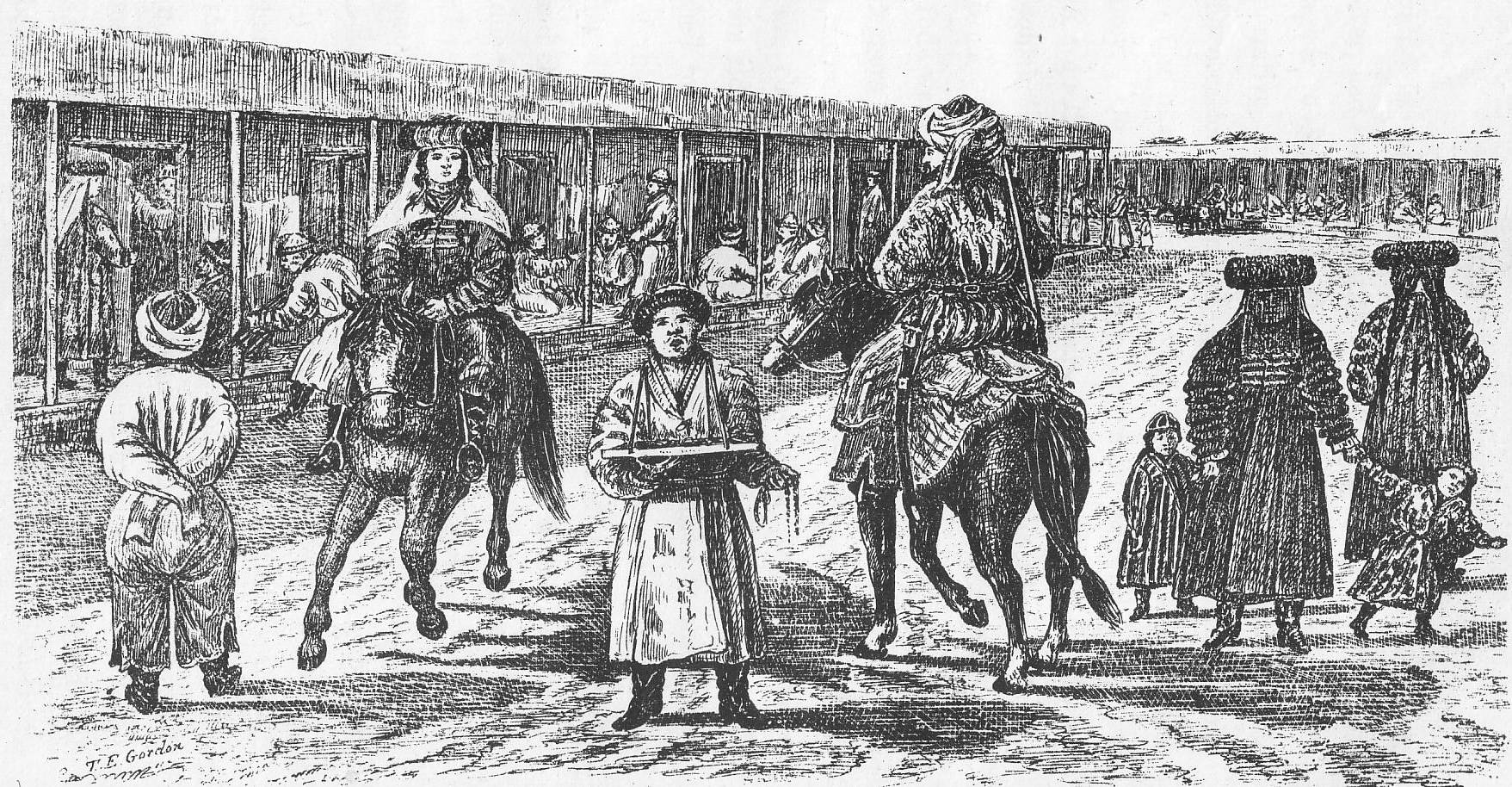
- Street scene in Yarkand in the 1870s

Uyghur name
- Uyghur: يەكەن (ياركەنت) ناھىيىسى
- Literal meaning: cliff city
Transcriptions
- Latin Yëziqi: Yeken (Yarkent) Nahiyisi
- Yengi Yeziⱪ: Yəkən (Yarkənt) Naⱨiyisi
- SASM/GNC: Yäkän (Yarkänt) Nahiyisi
- Siril Yëziqi: Йәкән (яркәнт) наһийиси

Chinese name
- Simplified Chinese: 莎车县
- Traditional Chinese: 莎車縣
Transcriptions
Standard Mandarin
- Hanyu Pinyin: Shāchē Xiàn
- Wade–Giles: Sha¹-chʻê¹ Hsien⁴
- IPA: [ʂáʈʂʰɤ́ ɕjɛ̂n]

Alternative Chinese name
- Simplified Chinese: 叶尔羌县
- Traditional Chinese: 葉爾羌縣
Transcriptions
Standard Mandarin
- Hanyu Pinyin: Yè'ěrqiāng Xiàn

Yarkant County, also known as Yakan County or Shache County, is a county in the Xinjiang, China, located on the southern rim of the Taklamakan Desert in the Tarim Basin. It is one of 11 counties administered under Kashgar Prefecture. The county, usually referred to as Yarkand in English, was the seat of an ancient Buddhist kingdom on the southern branch of the Silk Road and the Yarkand Khanate. The county sits at an altitude of 1,189 metres (3,901 ft) and as of 2003 had a population of 373,492.

The fertile oasis is fed by the Yarkand River, which flows north down from the Karakorum mountains and passes through the Kunlun Mountains, known historically as the Congling mountains (lit. 'Onion Mountains' - from the abundance of wild onions found there). The oasis now covers 3,210 square kilometres (1,240 sq mi), but was likely far more extensive before a period of desiccation affected the region from the 3rd century CE onwards.

Today, Yarkant is a predominantly Uyghur settlement with a small Tajik (Pamiri) minority. The irrigated oasis farmland produces cotton, wheat, corn, fruits (especially pomegranates, pears and apricots) and walnuts. Yak and sheep graze in the highlands. Mineral deposits include petroleum, natural gas, gold, copper, lead, bauxite, granite and coal.

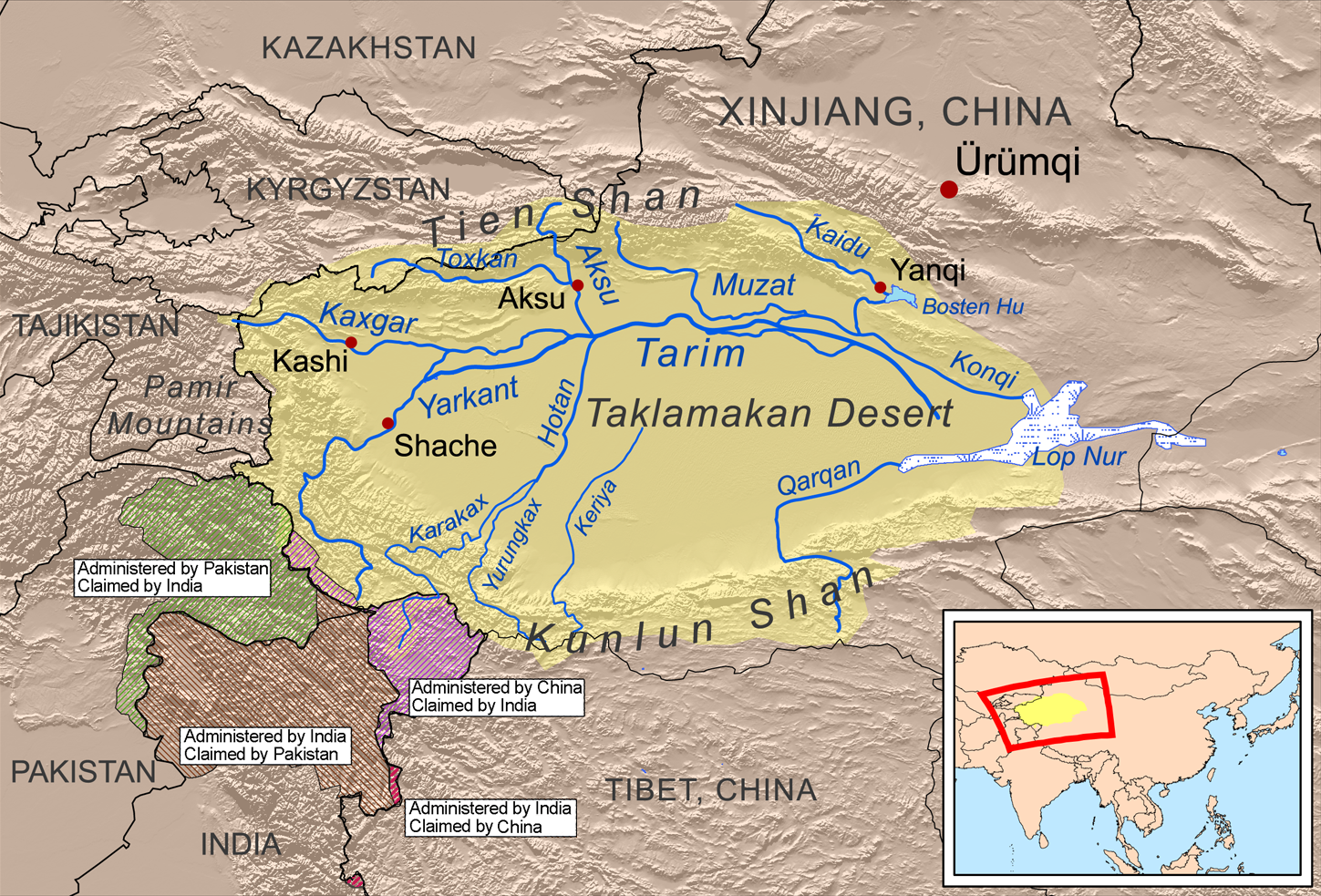
Map showing the rivers of the Tarim Basin and Yarkand River

== History ==
=== Han dynasty ===
The territory of Yārkand is first mentioned in the Book of Han (1st century BCE) as "Shaju" (Old Chinese, approximately, *s³a(j)-ka), which is probably related to the name of the Iranian Saka tribes. Descriptions in the Hou Hanshu ('History of the Later Han') contain insights into the complex political situation China faced in attempting to open up the "Silk Routes" to the West in the 1st century CE. According to the "Chapter on the Western Regions" in the Hou Hanshu:

"Going west from the kingdom of Suoju (Yarkand), and passing through the countries of Puli (Tashkurghan) and Wulei (centred on Sarhad in the Wakhan), you arrive among the Da Yuezhi (Kushans). To the east, it is 10,950 li (4,553 km) from Luoyang.

The Chanyu (Khan) of the Xiongnu took advantage of the chaos caused by Wang Mang (9-24 CE) and invaded the Western Regions. Only Yan, the king of Suoju, who was more powerful than the others, did not consent to being annexed. Previously, during the time of Emperor Yuan (48-33 BCE), he was a hostage prince and grew up in the capital. He admired and loved the Middle Kingdom and extended the rules of Chinese administration to his own country. He ordered all his sons to respectfully serve the Han dynasty generation by generation, and to never turn their backs on it. Yan died in the fifth Tianfeng year (18 CE). He was awarded the posthumous title of 'Faithful and Martial King'. His son, Kang, succeeded him on the throne.

At the beginning of Emperor Guangwu's reign (25-57 CE), Kang led the neighboring kingdoms to resist the Xiongnu. He escorted, and protected, more than a thousand people including the officers, the soldiers, the wife and children of the former Protector General. He sent a letter to Hexi (Chinese territory west of the Yellow River) to inquire about the activities of the Middle Kingdom, and personally expressed his attachment to, and admiration for, the Han dynasty.

In the fifth Jianwu year (29 CE) the General-in-Chief of Hexi, Dou Rong, following Imperial instructions, bestowed on Kang the titles of: "King of Chinese Suoju, Performer of Heroic Deeds Who Cherishes Virtue [and] Commandant-in-Chief of the Western Regions." The fifty-five kingdoms were all made dependencies after that.

In the ninth year (33 CE) Kang died. He was awarded the posthumous title of "Greatly Accomplished King." His younger brother, Xian, succeeded him on the throne. Xian attacked and conquered the kingdoms of Jumi (Keriya) and Xiye (Karghalik). He killed both their kings, and installed two sons of his elder brother, Kang, as the kings of Jumi and Xiye.

In the fourteenth year (38 CE), together with An, the king of Shanshan (the Lop Nor region), he sent envoys to the Imperial Palace to offer tribute. Following this, the Western Regions were (again) in communication with China. All the kingdoms to the east of the Congling (Pamirs) were dependent on Xian.

In the seventeenth year (41 CE), Xian again sent an envoy to present offerings [to the Emperor], and to ask that a Protector General be appointed. The Son of Heaven questioned the Excellency of Works, Dou Rong, about this. He was of the opinion that Xian, and his sons and brothers who had pledged to serve the Han were truly sincere. Therefore, [he suggested that] it would be appropriate to give him higher rank to maintain order and security.

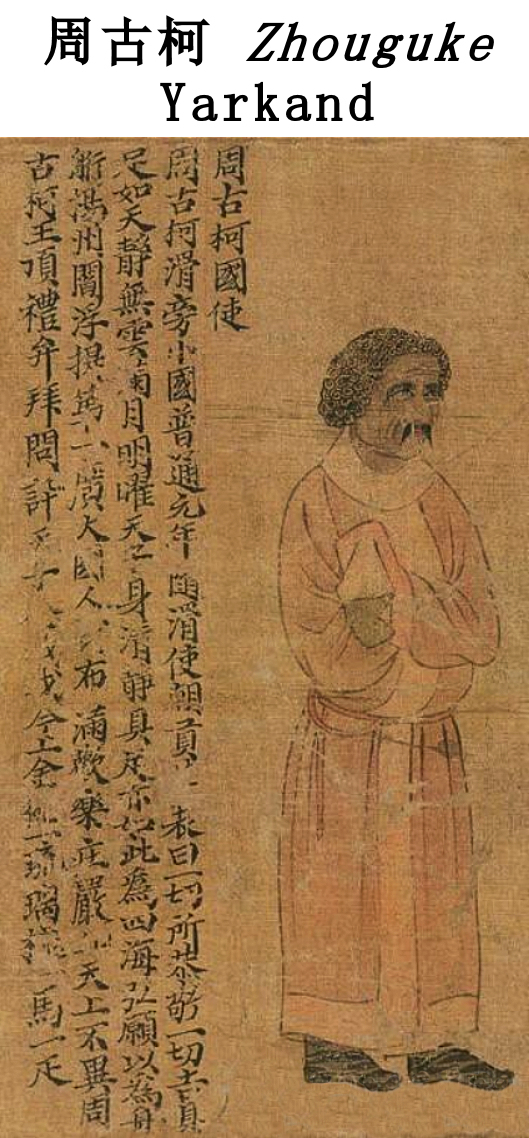
Yarkand ambassador at the Chinese court of Emperor Yuan of Liang in his capital Jingzhou in 516–520 CE, with explanatory text. Portraits of Periodical Offering of Liang, 11th century Song copy.

The Emperor then, using the same envoy that Xian had sent to him, bestowed upon him the seal and ribbon of "Protector General of the Western Regions," and gave him chariots, standards, gold, brocades and embroideries.

"Pei Zun, the Administrator of Dunhuang, wrote saying that foreigners should not be allowed to employ such great authority and that these decrees would cause the kingdoms to despair. An Imperial decree then ordered that the seal and ribbons of "Protector General" be recovered, and replaced with the seal and ribbon of "Great Han General." Xian's envoy refused to make the exchange, and (Pei) Zun took them by force.

Consequently, Xian became resentful. Furthermore, he falsely named himself "Great Protector General," and sent letters to all the kingdoms. They all submitted to him, and bestowed the title of Chanyu on him. Xian gradually became arrogant making heavy demands for duties and taxes. Several times he attacked Qiuci (Kucha) and the other kingdoms. All the kingdoms were anxious and fearful.

In the winter of the twenty-first year (45 CE), eighteen kings, including the king of Nearer Jushi (Turpan), Shanshan, Yanqi (Karashahr), and others, sent their sons to enter the service of the Emperor and offered treasure. As a result, they were granted audience when they circulated weeping, prostrating with their foreheads to the ground, in the hope of obtaining a Protector General. The Son of Heaven, considering that the Middle Kingdom was just beginning to return to peace and that the northern frontier regions were still unsettled, returned all the hostage princes with generous gifts.

At the same time, Xian, infatuated with his military power, wanted to annex the Western Regions, and greatly increased his attacks. The kingdoms, informed that no Protector General would be sent, and that the hostage princes were all returning, were very worried and frightened. Therefore, they sent a letter to the Administrator of Dunhuang to ask him to detain their hostage sons with him, so that they could point this out to the [king of] Suoju (Yarkand), and tell him that their young hostage sons were detained because a Protector General was to be sent. Then he [the king of Yarkand] would stop his hostilities. Pei Zun sent an official report informing the Emperor [of this proposal], which he approved.

In the twenty-second year (46 CE) Xian, aware that no Protector General was coming, sent a letter to An, king of Shanshan, ordering him to cut the route to the Han. An did not accept [this order], and killed the envoy. Xian was furious and sent soldiers to attack Shanshan. An gave battle but was defeated and fled into the mountains. Xian killed or captured more than a thousand men, and then withdrew.

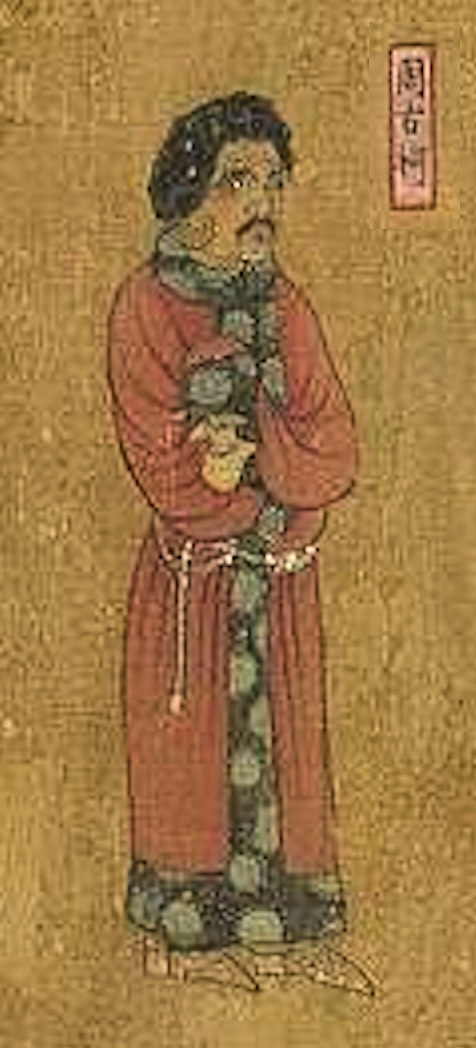
Yarkand (周古柯 Zhouguke) in Wanghuitu, circa 650 CE

That winter (46 CE), Xian returned and attacked Qiuci (Kucha), killed the king, and annexed the kingdom. The hostage princes of Shanshan, and then Yanqi (Karashahr) and the other kingdoms, were detained a long time at Dunhuang and became worried, so they fled and returned [to their kingdoms].

The king of Shanshan wrote a letter to the Emperor expressing his desire to return his son to enter the service of the Emperor, and again pleaded for a Protector General, saying that if a Protector General were not sent, he would be forced to obey the Xiongnu. The Son of Heaven replied:

"We are not able, at the moment, to send out envoys and Imperial troops so, in spite of their good wishes, each kingdom [should seek help], as they please, wherever they can, to the east, west, south, or north."

Following this, Shanshan, and Jushi (Turpan/Jimasa) again submitted to the Xiongnu. Meanwhile, Xian became increasingly violent.

The king of Guisai, reckoning that his kingdom was far enough away, killed Xian's envoy. Xian then attacked and killed him. He appointed a nobleman from that country, Sijian, king of Guisai. Furthermore, Xian appointed his own son, Zeluo, to be king of Qiuci (Kucha). Xian, taking account of the youth of Zeluo, detached a part of the territory from Qiuci (Kucha) from which he made the kingdom of Wulei (Yengisar). He transferred Sijian to the post of king of Wulei, and appointed another noble to the post of king of Guisai.

Several years later, the people of the kingdom of Qiuci (Kucha), killed Zeluo and Sijian, and sent envoys to the Xiongnu to ask them to appoint a king to replace them. The Xiongnu established a nobleman of Qiuci (Kucha), Shendu, to be king of Qiuci (Kucha), making it dependent on the Xiongnu.

Because Dayuan (Ferghana) had reduced their tribute and taxes, Xian personally took command of several tens of thousands of men taken from several kingdoms, and attacked Dayuan (Ferghana). Yanliu, the king of Dayuan, came before him to submit. Xian took advantage of this to take him back to his own kingdom. Then he transferred Qiaosaiti, the king of Jumi (Keriya), to the post of king of Dayuan (Ferghana). Then Kangju (Tashkent plus the Chu, Talas, and middle Jaxartes basins) attacked him there several times and Qiaosaiti fled home [to Keriya] more than a year later. Xian appointed him king of Jumi (Keriya) and sent Yanliu back to Dayuan again, ordering him to bring the customary tribute and offerings.

Xian also banished the king of Yutian (Khotan), Yulin, to be king of Ligui and set up his younger brother, Weishi, as king of Yutian.

More than a year later Xian became suspicious that the kingdoms wanted to rebel against him. He summoned Weishi, and the kings of Jumi (Keriya), Gumo (Aksu), and Zihe (Shahidulla), and killed them all. He did not set up any more kings, he just sent generals to maintain order and guard these kingdoms. Rong, the son of Weishi, fled and made submission to the Han, who named him: "Marquis Who Maintains Virtue." A general from Suoju (Yarkand), named Junde, had been posted to Yutian (Khotan), and tyrannised the people there who became indignant.

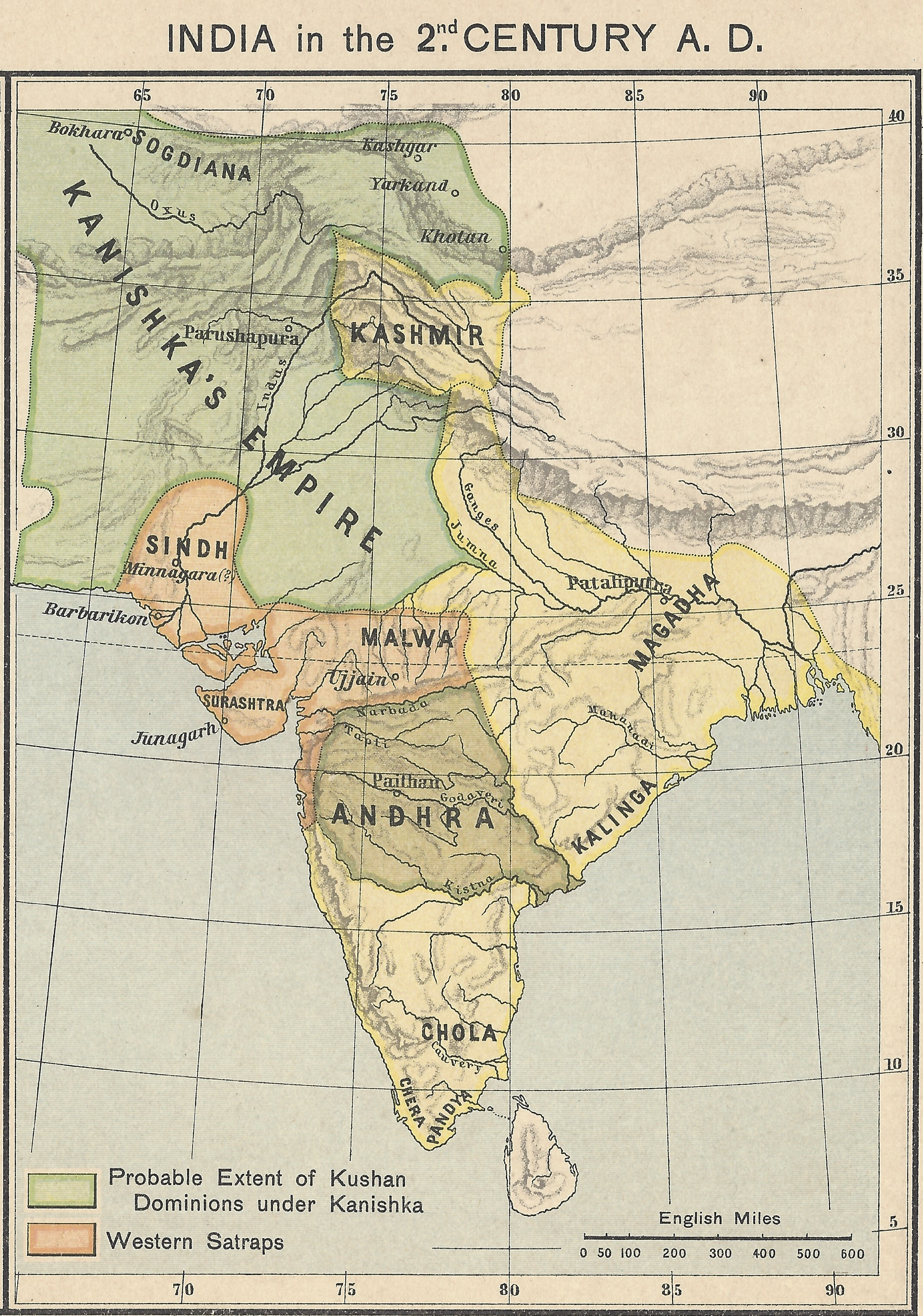
Kanishka's Empire (2nd century AD) including Yarkand

In the third Yongping year (60 CE), during the reign of Emperor Ming, a high official of this country, called Dumo, had left town when he saw a wild pig. He wanted to shoot it, but the pig said to him: "Do not shoot me, I will undertake to kill Junde for you." Following this, Dumo plotted with his brothers and killed Junde. However, another high official, Xiumo Ba, plotted, in his turn, with a Chinese man, Han Rong, and others, to kill Dumo and his brothers, then he named himself king of Yutian (Khotan). Together with men from the kingdom of Jumi (Keriya), he attacked and killed the Suoju (Yarkand) general who was at Pishan (modern Pishan or Guma). He then returned with the soldiers.

Then Xian sent his Heir Apparent, and his State Chancellor, leading 20,000 soldiers from several kingdoms, to attack Xiumo Ba. [Xiumo] Ba came to meet them and gave battle, defeating the soldiers of Suoju (Yarkand) who fled, and more than 10,000 of them were killed.

Xian again fielded several tens of thousands of men from several kingdoms, and personally led them to attack Xiumo Ba. [Xiumo] Ba was again victorious and beheaded more than half of the enemy. Xian escaped and fled, returning to his kingdom. Xiumo Ba advanced and encircled Suoju (Yarkand), but he was hit and killed by an arrow, and his soldiers retreated to Yutian (Khotan).

Suyule, State Chancellor [of Khotan], and others, appointed Guangde, the son of Xiumo Ba's elder brother, king. The Xiongnu, with Qiuci (Kucha) and the other kingdoms, attacked Suoju (Yarkand), but were unable to take it.

Later, Guangde recognising of the exhaustion of Suoju (Yarkand), sent his younger brother, the Marquis who Supports the State, Ren, commanding an army, to attack Xian. As he had suffered war continuously, Xian sent an envoy to make peace with Guangde. Guangde's father had previously been detained for several years in Suoju (Yarkand). Xian returned Guangde's father and also gave one of his daughters in marriage and swore brotherhood to Guangde, so the soldiers withdrew and left.

In the following year (61 CE), Qieyun, the Chancellor of Suoju (Yarkand), and others, worried by Xian's arrogance, plotted to get the town to submit to Yutian (Khotan). Guangde, the king of Yutian (Khotan), then led 30,000 men from several kingdoms to attack Suoju (Yarkand). Xian stayed in the town to defend it and sent a messenger to say to Guangde: "I have given you your father and a wife. Why are you attacking me?" Guangde replied to him: "O king, you are the father of my wife. It has been a long time since we met. I want us to meet, each of us escorted by only two men, outside the town wall to make an alliance."

Xian consulted Qieyun about this. Qieyun said to him: "Guangde, your son-in-law is a very close relation; you should go out to see him." Xian then rashly went out. Guangde advanced and captured him. In addition, Qieyun and his colleagues let the soldiers of Yutian (Khotan) into the town to capture Xian's wife and children. (Guangde) annexed his kingdom. He put Xian in chains, and took him home with him. More than a year later, he killed him.

When the Xiongnu heard that Guangde had defeated Suoju (Yarkand), they sent five generals leading more than 30,000 men from fifteen kingdoms including Yanqi (Karashahr), Weili (Korla), and Qiuci (Kucha), to besiege Yutian (Khotan). Guangde asked to submit. He sent his Heir Apparent as a hostage and promised to give felt carpets each year. In winter, the Xiongnu ordered soldiers to take Xian's son, Bujuzheng, who was a hostage with them, to appoint him king of Suoju (Yarkand).

Guangde then attacked and killed [Bujuzheng], and put his younger brother, Qili, on the throne. This was in the third Yuanhe year (86 CE) of Emperor Zhang.

At this time Chief Clerk Ban Chao brought the troops of several kingdoms to attack Suoju (Yarkand). He soundly defeated Suoju (Yarkand) so it submitted to Han."

In 90 CE the Yuezhi or Kushans invaded the region with an army of reportedly 70,000 men, under their Viceroy, Xian, but they were forced to withdraw without a battle after Ban Chao instigated a "burnt earth" policy.

After the Yuanchu period (114-120 CE), when the Yuezhi or Kushans placed a hostage prince on the throne of Kashgar:

"... Suoju [Yarkand] followed by resisting Yutian [Khotan], and put themselves under Shule [Kashgar]. Thus Shule [Kashgar], became powerful and a rival to Qiuci [Kucha] and Yutian [Khotan]."

"In the second Yongjian year [127 CE] of the reign of Emperor Shun, [Ban] Yong once again attacked and subdued Yanqi [Karashahr]; and then Qiuci [Kucha], Shule [Kashgar], Yutian [Khotan], Suoju [Yarkand], and other kingdoms, seventeen altogether, came to submit. Following this, the Wusun [Ili River Basin and Issyk Kul], and the countries of the Congling [Pamir Mountains], put an end to their disruptions to communications with the west."

In 130 CE, Yarkand, along with Ferghana and Kashgar, sent tribute and offerings to the Chinese Emperor.

=== Later history ===
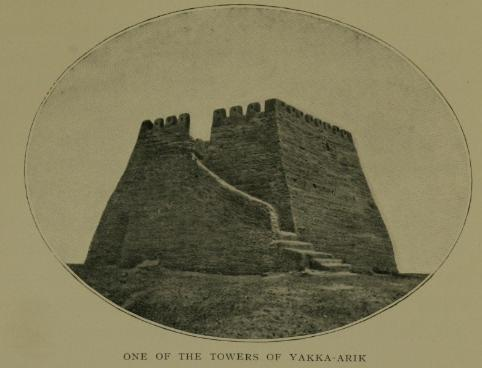
The towers in Yakka-Arik

There is very little information on Yarkant's history for many centuries, apart from a couple of brief references in Tang dynasty (618-907) histories and it appears to have been of less note than the oasis of Kharghalik (see Yecheng and Yecheng County) to its south.

The area became the main base in the region for Chagatai Khan (died 1241), who inherited Kashgaria (and also much of the land between the Oxus (Amu Darya) and Jaxartes (Syr Darya) rivers) after his father, Genghis Khan, died in 1227.

Marco Polo described Yarkant in 1273, but said only that this "province" (of Kublai Khan's nephew, Kaidu, d. 1301) was, "five days' journey in extent. The inhabitants follow the law of Mahomet, and there are also some Nestorian Christians. They are subject to the Great Khan's nephew. It is amply stocked with the means of life, especially cotton."

At the end of the 16th century Yarkant was incorporated into the Khanate of Kashgar and became its capital. The Jesuit Benedict Göez, who sought a route from the Mughal Empire to Cathay (which, according to his superiors, may or may not have been the same place as China), arrived in Yarkant with a caravan from Kabul in late 1603. He remained there for about a year, making a short trip to Khotan during that time. He reported:

"Hiarchan [Yarkant], the capital of the kingdom of Cascar, is a mart of much note, both for the great concourse of merchants, and for the variety of wares. At this capital the caravan of Kabul merchants reaches its terminus; and a new one is formed for the journey to Cathay. The command of this caravan is sold by the king, who invests the chiefs with a kind of royal authority over the merchants for the whole journey. A twelvemonth passed away however before the new company was formed, for the way is long and perilous, and the caravan is not formed every year, but only when a large number arrange to join it, and when it is known that they will be allowed to enter Cathay."

During his journey, Göez also noted the presence of large marble quarries in the area, leading him to write that amongst native travellers from Yarkant to Cathay:

"no article of traffic is more valuable or more generally adopted as an investment for this journey than lumps of a certain transparent kind of marble called by the Chinese "jusce" (jade). They carry these to the Emperor of Cathay, attracted by the high prices which he deems it obligatory on his dignity to give; and such pieces as the Emperor does not fancy they are free to dispose of to private individuals."

=== Yarkent Khanate ===
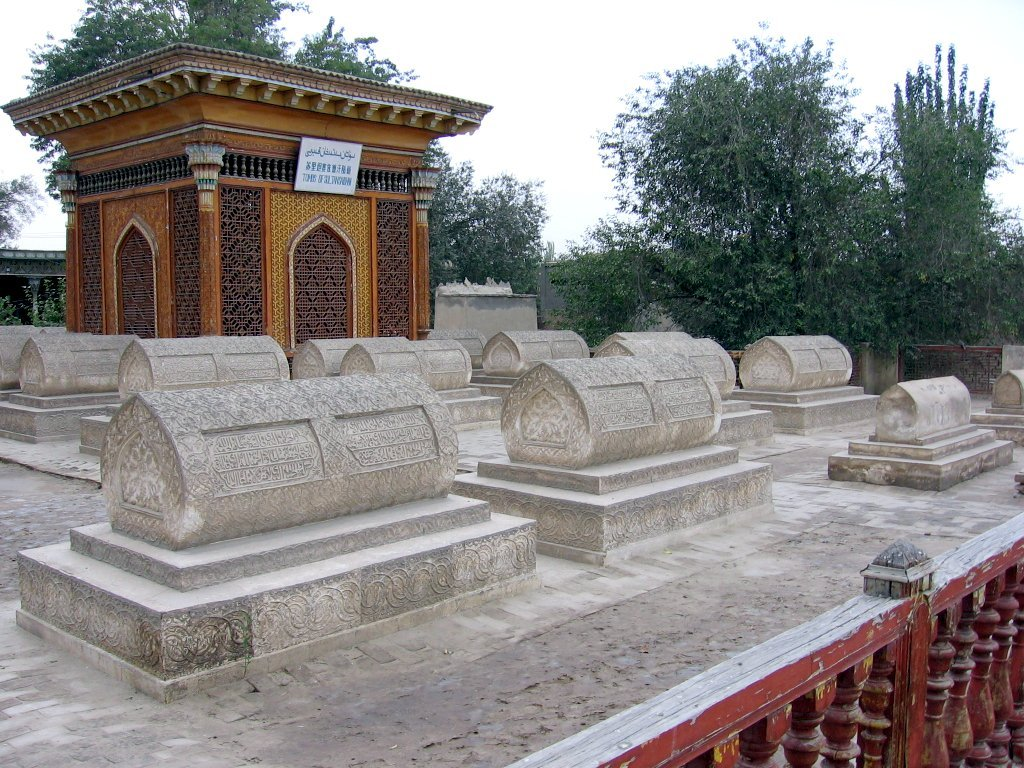
Tombs of Yarkand Khans (near the Altyn Mosque)

Yarkent served as capital for the Yarkent Khanate, also known as Yarkent State, from the establishment of Yarkent Khanate to its fall (1514–1713).

The Khanate was predominantly Uyghur/Turki; some of its most populated cities were Hotan, Yarkent, Kashgar, Yangihissar, Aksu, Uchturpan, Kucha, Karashar, Turpan and Kumul. It enjoyed continued dominance in the region for about 200 years until it was conquered by the Dzungar Khan, Tsewang Rabtan in 1705.

In the first half of the 14th century the Chagatai Khanate had collapsed; on the western part of the collapsed Chagatai Khanate, the Empire of Timur emerged in 1370, and became the dominant power in the region until its conquest in 1508 by the Shaybanids. Its eastern part became Moghulistan, which was created by Tughluk Timur Khan in 1347 with the capital centered in Almalik, around the Ili River Valley. It comprised all the settled lands of Eastern Kashgaria, as well as regions of Turpan and Kumul which were known at the time as Uyghurstan, according to Balkh and Indian sources of the 16th and 17th centuries. The reigning dynasty of the Yarkent Khanate originated from this state, which existed for more than a century.

In 1509 the Dughlats, vassal rulers of the Tarim basin, rebelled against the Moghulistan Khanate and broke away. Five years later Sultan Said Khan, a brother of the Khan of Moghulistan in Turfan, conquered the Dughlats but established his own Yarkent khanate instead.

This put an end to the dominance in the cities of Kashgaria of the Dughlat emirs, who had controlled them since 1220, when most of Kashgaria had been granted to the Dughlat by Chagatai Khan himself. The conquest of the Dughlats allowed the Yarkent state to become the foremost power in the region.

=== Qing dynasty ===
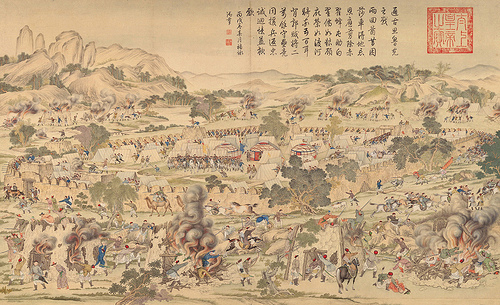
During the Revolt of the Altishahr Khojas at the Battle of Tonguzluq (1758), Manchu general Zhao Hui tries to take Yarkand but is defeated.

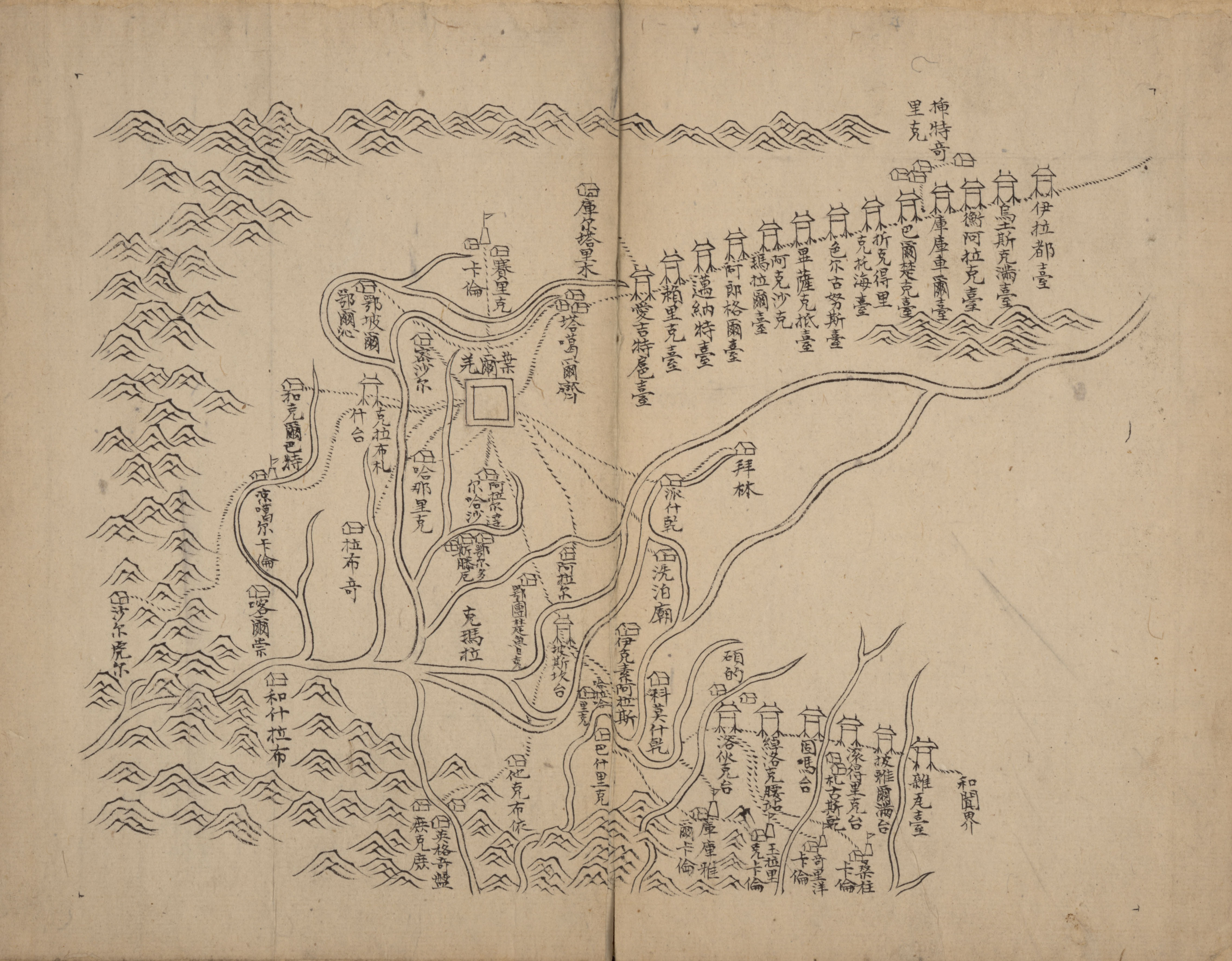
Yarkand (c. 1759)

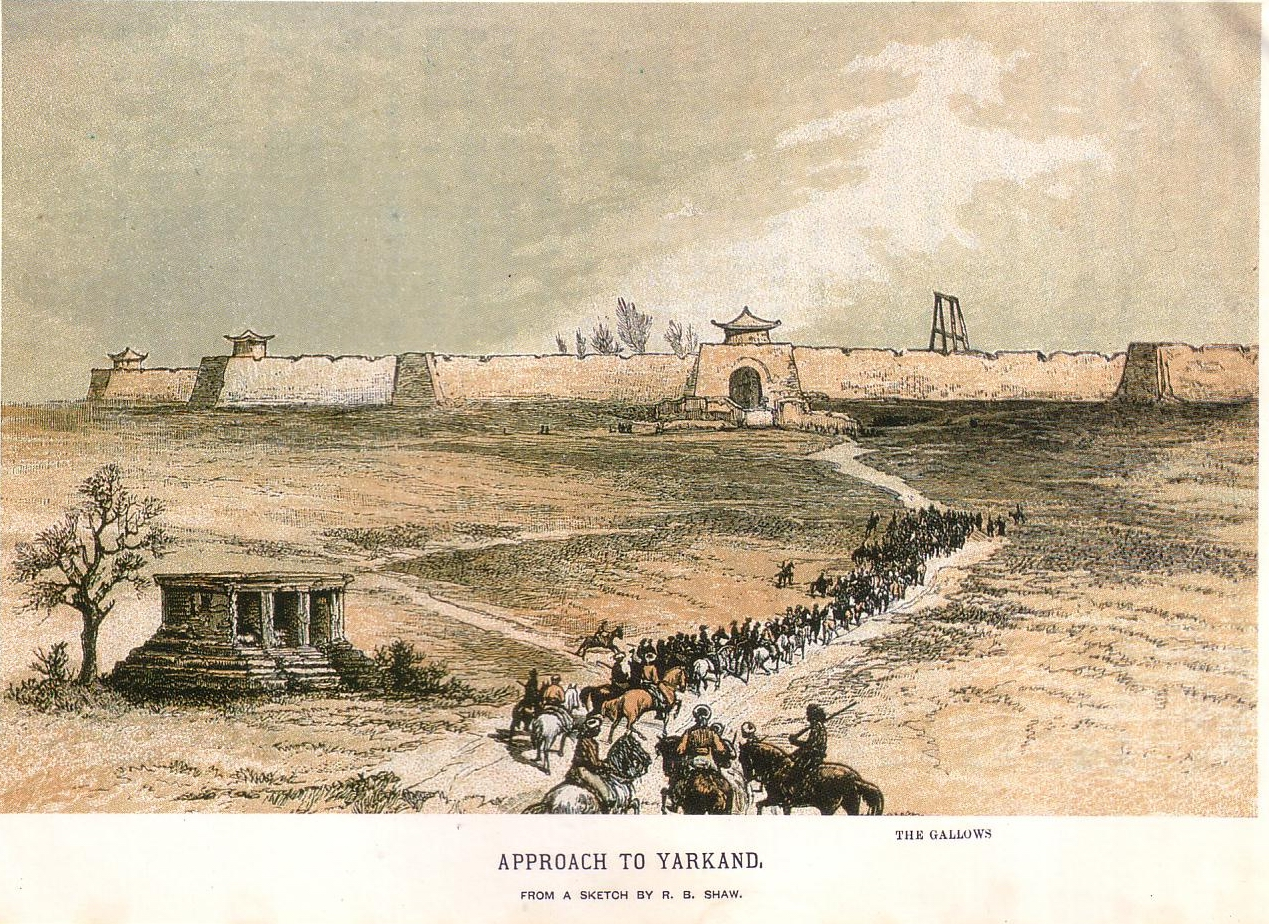
Yarkand, 1868, showing city walls and gallows

The Qing dynasty gained control of the region in the middle of the 18th century.

By the 19th century, due to its active trade with Ladakh, and an influx of foreign merchants, it became "the largest and most populous of all the States of Káshghar."(Kashgar). Yakub Beg (1820–1877) conquered Khotan, Aksu, Kashgar, and neighbouring towns with the help of the Russians in the 1860s. He made Yarkant the capital of the newly founded Turkic state of Yettishar, where he received embassies from England in 1870 and 1873. The Qing dynasty defeated Yakub at Turpan in 1877 after which he committed suicide. Thus ended the Yettishar kingdom, and the region returned to Qing Chinese control.

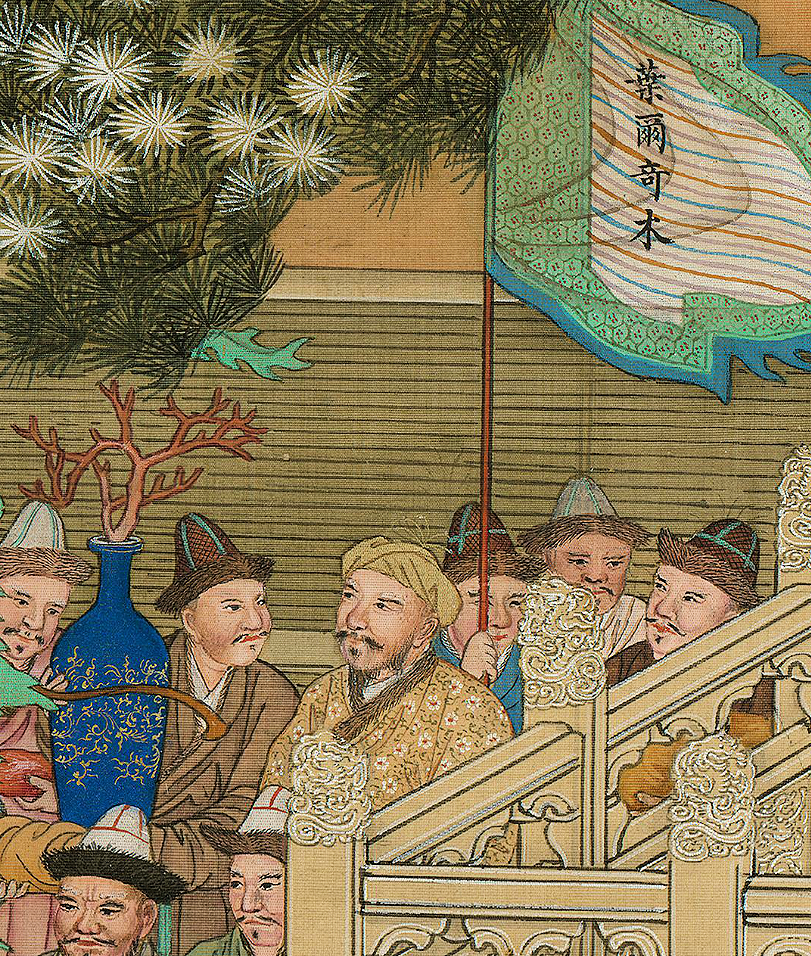
Yarkent delegates (葉爾奇木) in Peking in 1761. (From Ten Thousand Nations Coming to Pay Tribute, 万国来朝图)

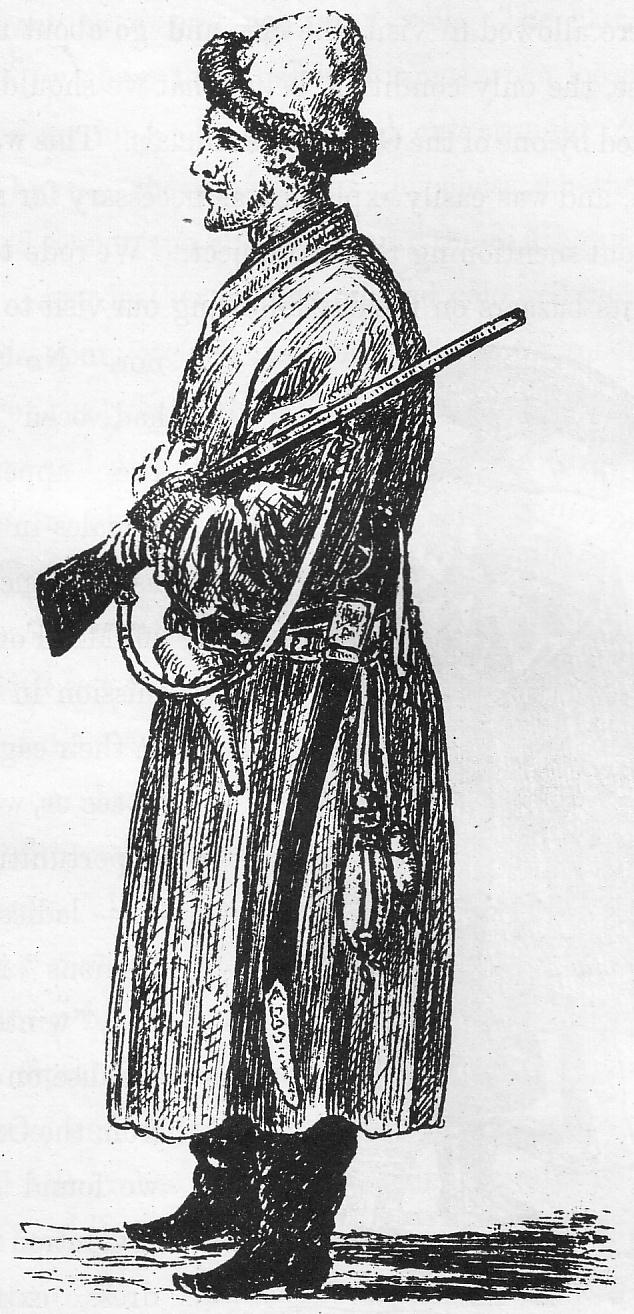
Yarkand official, 1870s

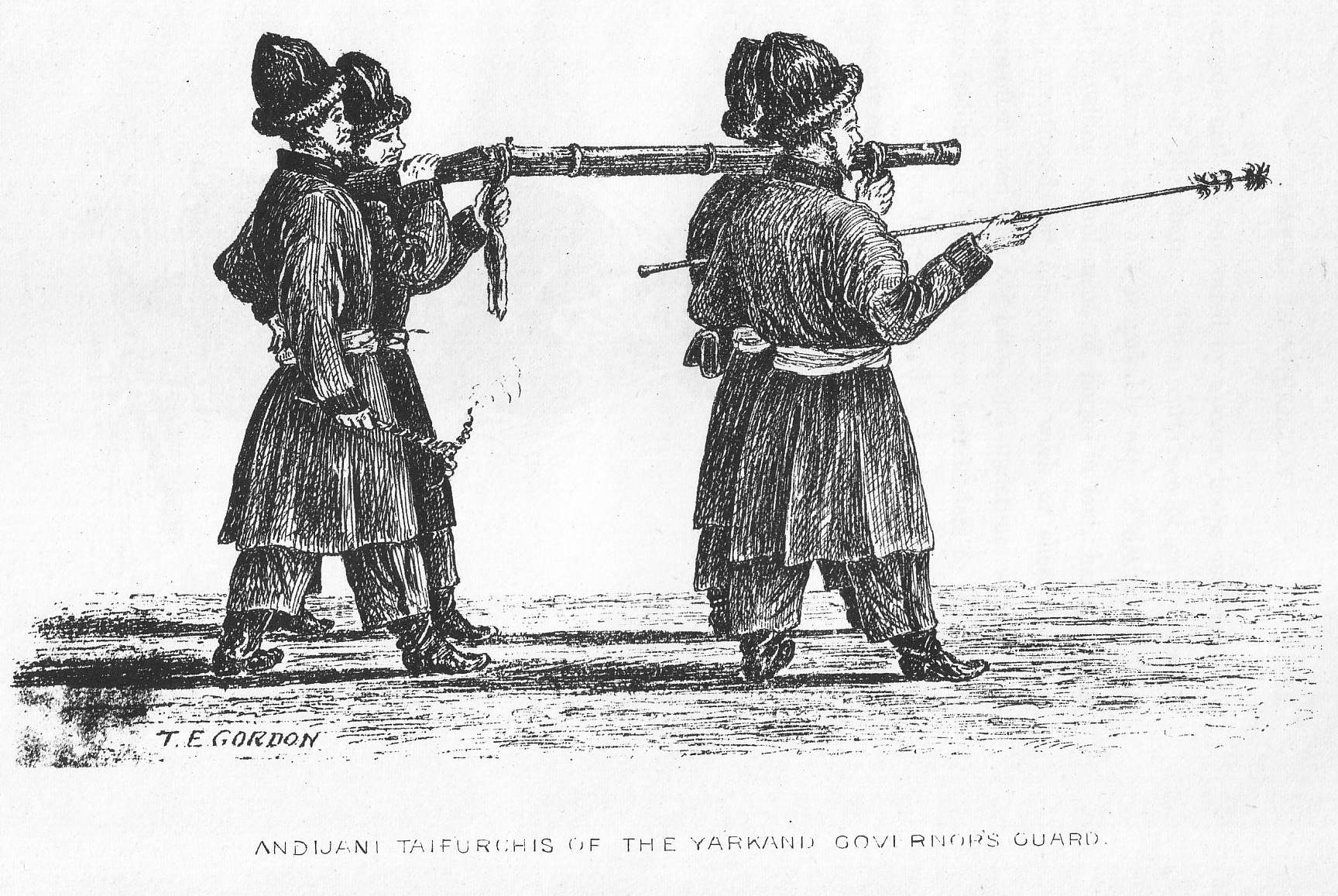
Andijani Taifurghis of the Yarkand Governor's Guard, 1870s

Chinese merchants and soldiers, foreigners like Russians, foreign Muslims, and other Turki merchants all engaged in temporary marriages with Turki (Uyghur) women, since a lot of foreigners lived in Yarkand, temporary marriage flourished there more than it did towards areas with fewer foreigners like areas towards Kucha's east. The Earl of Dunmore wrote in 1894:

Almost every Chinaman in Yarkand, soldier or civilian, takes unto himself a temporary wife, dispensing entirely with the services of the clergy, as being superfluous, and most of the high officials also give way to the same amiable weakness, their mistresses being in almost all cases natives of Khotan, which city enjoys the unenviable distinction of supplying every large city in Turkestan with courtesans.

When a Chinaman is called back to his own home in China proper, or a Chinese soldier has served his time in Turkestan and has to return to his native city of Pekin or Shanghai, he either leaves his temporary wife behind to shift for herself, or he sells her to a friend. If he has a family he takes the boys with him~—if he can afford it—failing that, the sons are left alone and unprotected to fight the battle of life, While in the case of daughters, he sells them to one of his former companions for a trifling sum.

The natives, although all Mahammadans, have a strong predilection for the Chinese, and seem to like their manners and customs, and never seem to resent this behaviour to their womankind, their own manners, customs, and morals (?) being of the very loosest description.

=== Twentieth century ===
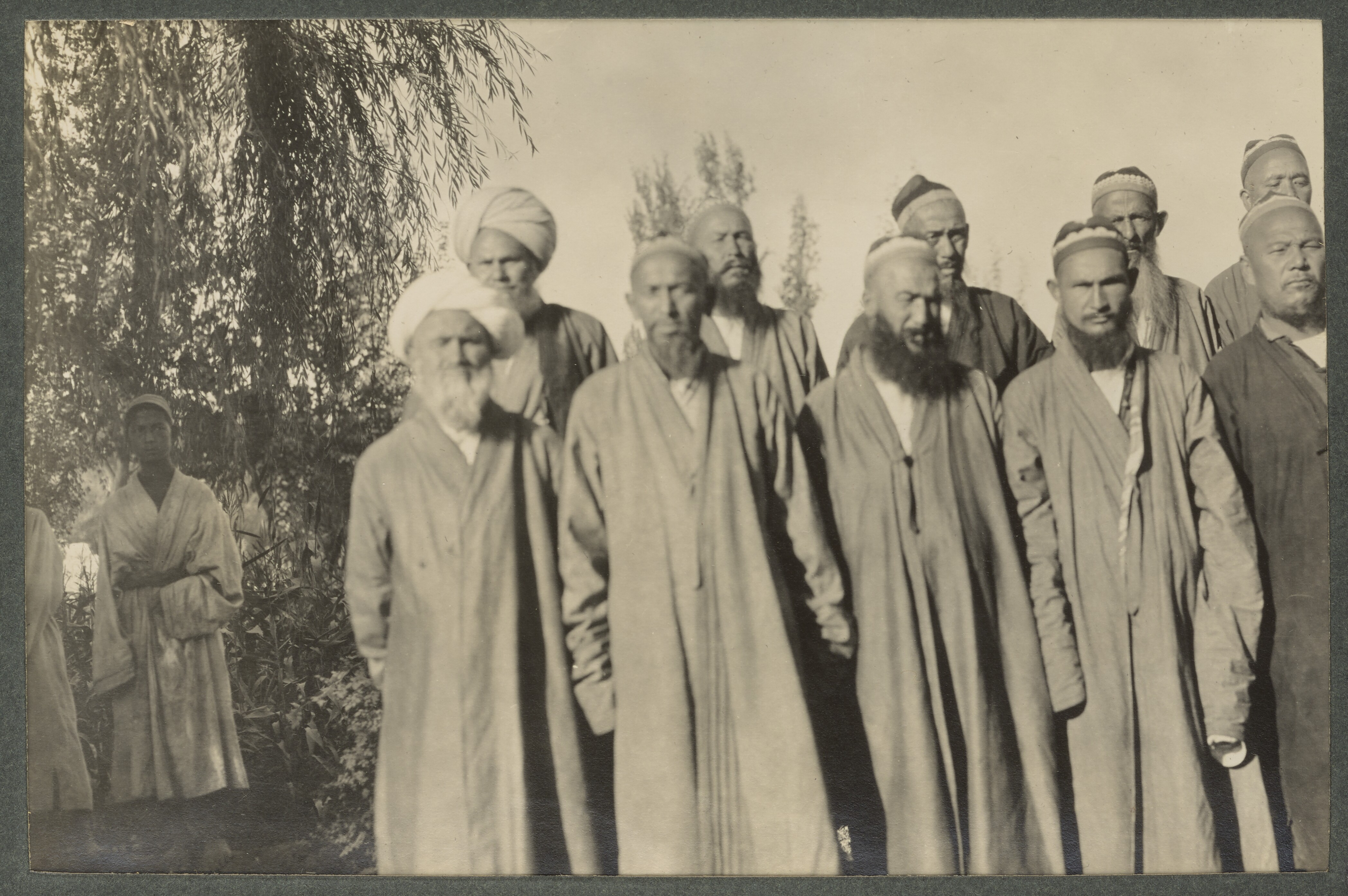
The Begs of Yarkand, 1915

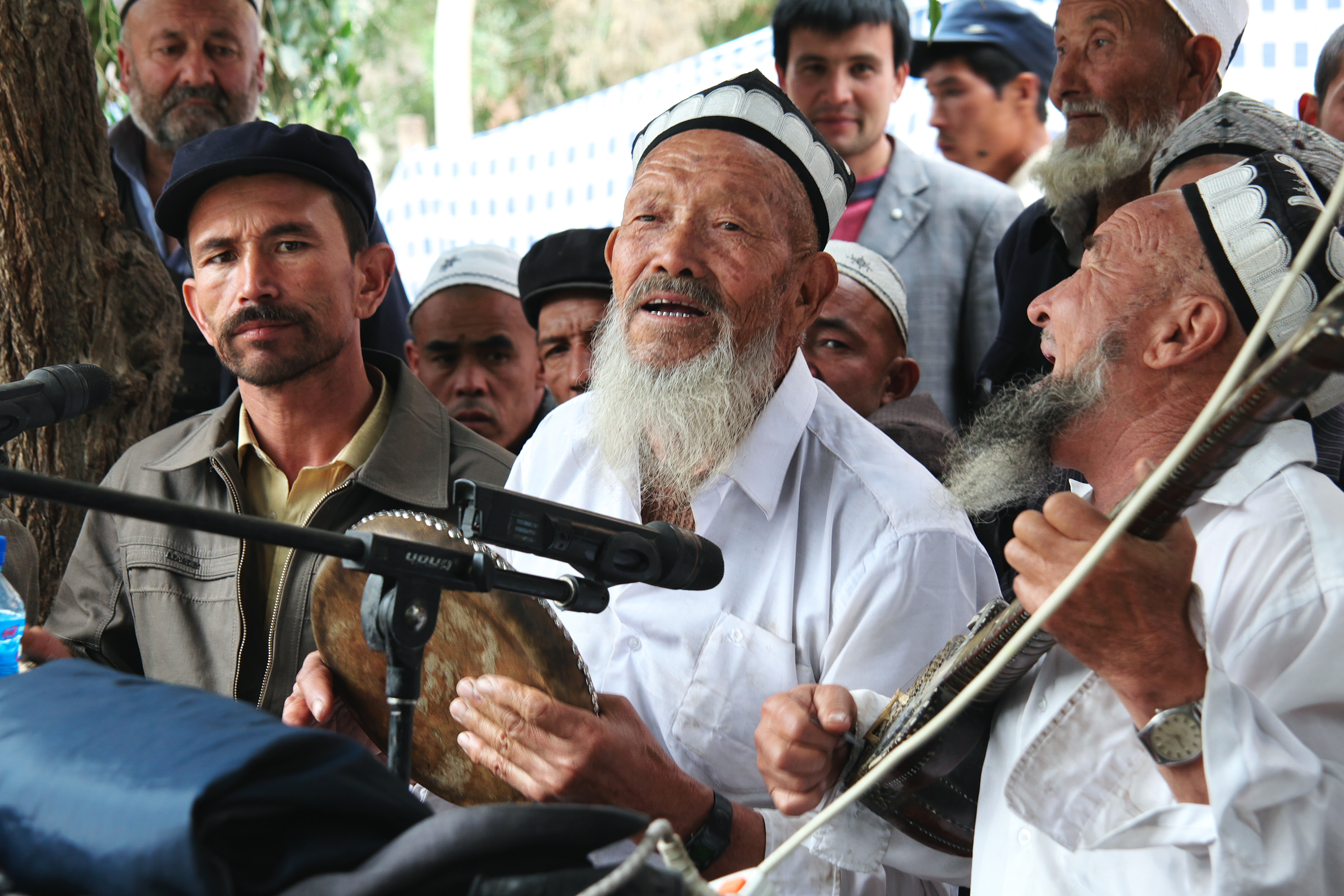
Uyghur meshrep in Yarkand

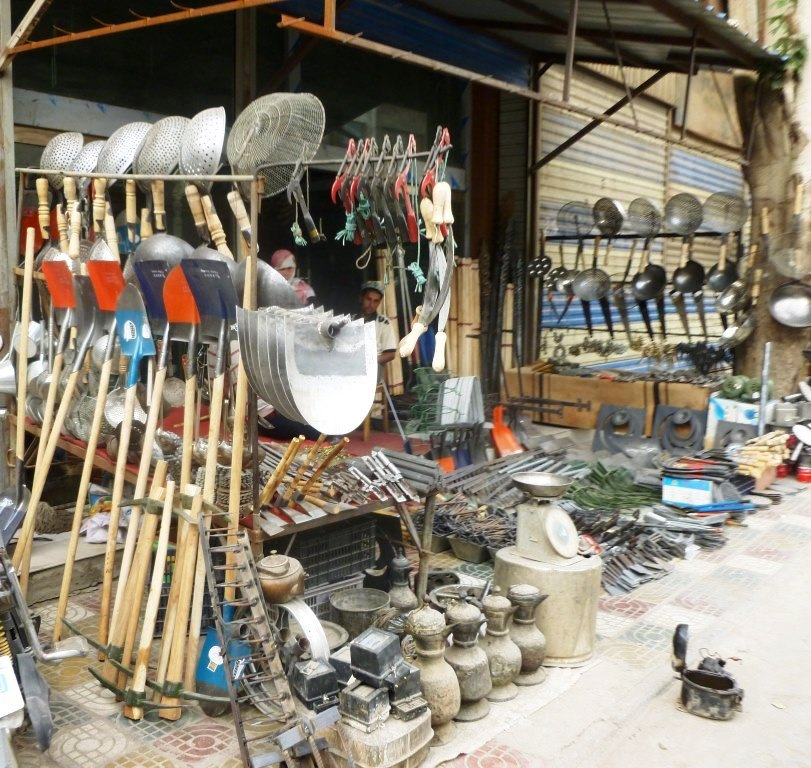
Hardware store. Yarkand.

The Battle of Yarkand took place in Yarkant county, in April 1934. Ma Zhancang's Chinese Muslim army defeated the Turkic Uighur and Kirghiz army, and the Afghan volunteers sent by king Mohammed Zahir Shah, and exterminated them all. The emir Abdullah Bughra was killed and beheaded, his head was sent to Idgah mosque.

Almost all the ancient buildings of the old city were destroyed during the Cultural Revolution (1966–1968) with only the central mosque, the main gate of the old palace and the royal cemetery surviving.

In July 2014, militants attacked two towns in armed clashes in the county, leaving dozens of people dead.

In August 2015, it was reported by Chinese media that the amount of farmland per capita was increased from 0.17 hectares (0.42 acres) per person to 0.23 hectares (0.57 acres) after clearing up more arable lands.

== Geography ==
Yarkant is strategically located about halfway between Kashgar and Khotan, at the junction of a branch road north to Aksu. It also was the terminus for caravans coming from Kashmir via Ladakh and then over the Karakoram Pass to the oasis of Niya in the Tarim Basin. The Xinjiang-Tibet Highway China National Highway 219, built in 1956 commences in Yecheng/Yarkant and heads south and west, across Aksai Chin and into central Tibet.

From Yarkant another important route headed southwest via Tashkurgan Town to the Wakhan corridor from where travellers could cross the relatively easy Baroghil Pass and Badakshan.

=== Climate ===
As with much of southern Xinjiang, Yarkant has a temperate zone, continental desert climate (Köppen BWk), with a mean total of only 61 mm (2.40 in) of precipitation per annum. As spring and autumn are short, winter and summer are the main seasons. The monthly daily average temperature ranges from −5.2 °C (22.6 °F) in January to 25.3 °C (77.5 °F) in July; the annual mean is 12.01 °C (53.6 °F). The diurnal temperature variation is not particularly large for a desert, averaging 13.3 °C (23.9 °F) annually. With monthly percent possible sunshine ranging from 56% in March to 75% in October, the county seat receives 2,860 hours of bright sunshine annually.

Climate data for Yarkhant, elevation 1,231 m (4,039 ft), (1991–2020 normals, extremes 1951–present)
Month	Jan	Feb	Mar	Apr	May	Jun	Jul	Aug	Sep	Oct	Nov	Dec	Year
Record high °C (°F)	19.4 (66.9)	23.9 (75.0)	29.8 (85.6)	33.8 (92.8)	36.3 (97.3)	40.7 (105.3)	41.5 (106.7)	39.4 (102.9)	35.3 (95.5)	29.8 (85.6)	24.8 (76.6)	19.5 (67.1)	41.5 (106.7)
Mean daily maximum °C (°F)	0.6 (33.1)	6.8 (44.2)	16.1 (61.0)	23.8 (74.8)	27.8 (82.0)	31.4 (88.5)	32.8 (91.0)	31.1 (88.0)	27.1 (80.8)	20.9 (69.6)	11.9 (53.4)	2.7 (36.9)	19.4 (66.9)
Daily mean °C (°F)	−5.4 (22.3)	0.5 (32.9)	9.3 (48.7)	16.6 (61.9)	20.6 (69.1)	24.2 (75.6)	25.6 (78.1)	24.1 (75.4)	19.6 (67.3)	12.4 (54.3)	4.1 (39.4)	−3.1 (26.4)	12.4 (54.3)
Mean daily minimum °C (°F)	−10.3 (13.5)	−4.8 (23.4)	3.2 (37.8)	9.9 (49.8)	14.0 (57.2)	17.6 (63.7)	19.2 (66.6)	17.9 (64.2)	13.0 (55.4)	5.2 (41.4)	−1.8 (28.8)	−7.5 (18.5)	6.3 (43.4)
Record low °C (°F)	−23.4 (−10.1)	−24.1 (−11.4)	−8.0 (17.6)	−0.1 (31.8)	4.4 (39.9)	8.8 (47.8)	11.6 (52.9)	9.4 (48.9)	3.9 (39.0)	−3.3 (26.1)	−10.4 (13.3)	−22.1 (−7.8)	−24.1 (−11.4)
Average precipitation mm (inches)	2.0 (0.08)	2.7 (0.11)	3.8 (0.15)	4.3 (0.17)	10.6 (0.42)	9.6 (0.38)	13.3 (0.52)	10.4 (0.41)	7.1 (0.28)	0.8 (0.03)	1.7 (0.07)	1.4 (0.06)	67.7 (2.68)
Average precipitation days (≥ 0.1 mm)	1.6	1.6	1.3	1.4	3.3	4.1	4.4	4.1	2.6	0.6	0.3	1.6	26.9
Average snowy days	5.3	2.8	0.5	0	0	0	0	0	0	0	0.6	4.6	13.8
Average relative humidity (%)	64	54	41	36	41	42	48	54	56	55	57	67	51
Mean monthly sunshine hours	162.4	172.0	199.4	218.4	264.1	294.8	295.2	264.3	250.0	257.8	209.7	167.0	2,755.1
Percentage possible sunshine	53	56	53	55	59	67	66	64	69	76	71	57	62
Source: China Meteorological Administrationall-time record highall-time February high

== Administrative divisions ==
Yarkant County includes 5 subdistricts, 14 towns, 14 townships, and 1 ethnic township.

Name	Simplified Chinese	Hanyu Pinyin	Uyghur (UEY)	Uyghur Latin (ULY)	Administrative division code	Notes
Subdistricts
Yakan Subdistrict	叶尔羌街道	Yè'ěrqiāng Jiēdào	يەكەن كوچا باشقارمىسى	yeken kocha bashqarmisi	653125001	
Chengzhong Subdistrict	城中街道	Chéngzhōng Jiēdào	شەھەر ئوتتۇرا كوچا باشقارمىسى	sheher Ottura kocha bashqarmisi	653125002	
Chengdong Subdistrict	城东街道	Chéngdōng Jiēdào	شەرقى شەھەر كوچا باشقارمىسى	sherqi sheher kocha bashqarmisi	653125003	
Chengxi Subdistrict	城西街道	Chéngxī Jiēdào	چېڭشى كوچا باشقارمىسى	chëngshi kocha bashqarmisi	653125004	
Chengbei Subdistrict	城北街道	Chéngběi Jiēdào	شەھەر شىمالى كوچا باشقارمىسى	sheher shimali kocha bashqarmisi	653125005	
Towns
Yakan Town	莎车镇	Shāchē Zhèn	يەكەن بازىرى	yeken baziri	653125100	
Charak Town	恰热克镇	Qiàrèkè Zhèn	چارەك بازىرى	charek baziri	653125101	
Elishku Town	艾力西湖镇	Àilìxīhú Zhèn	ئېلىشقۇ بازىرى	Ëlishqu baziri	653125102	
Hangdi Town	荒地镇	Huāngdì Zhèn	خاڭدى بازىرى	xangdi baziri	653125103	
Awat Town	阿瓦提镇	Āwǎtí Zhèn	ئاۋات بازىرى	Awat baziri	653125104	
Beshkent Town	白什坎特镇	Báishíkǎntè Zhèn	بەشكەنت بازىرى	beshkent baziri	653125105	
Egerchi Town	依盖尔其镇	Yīgài'ěrqí Zhèn	ئېگەرچى بازىرى	Ëgerchi baziri	653125106	
Gulbagh Town	古勒巴格镇	Gǔlèbāgé Zhèn	گۈلباغ بازىرى	gülbagh baziri	653125107	Formerly Gulbagh Township (گۈلباغ بازىرى / 古勒巴格乡)
Misha Town	米夏镇	Mǐxià Zhèn	مىشا بازىرى	misha baziri	653125108	Formerly Misha Township (米夏乡)
Tomosteng Town	托木吾斯塘镇	Tuōmùwúsītáng Zhèn	تومئۆستەڭ بازىرى	tom'östeng baziri	653125109	formerly Tomosteng Township (تومئۆستەڭ يېزىسى / 托木吾斯塘乡)
Tagharchi Town	塔尕尔其镇	Tǎgǎ'ěrqí Zhèn	تاغارچى بازىرى	tagharchi baziri	653125110	formerly Tagharchi Township (تاغارچى يېزىسى / 塔尕尔其乡)
Odanlik Town	乌达力克镇	Wūdálìkè Zhèn	ئودانلىق بازىرى	Odanliq baziri	653125111	formerly Odanlik Township (ئودانلىق يېزىسى / 乌达力克乡)
Alamet Town	阿拉买提镇	Ālāmǎití Zhèn	ئالامەت بازىرى	Alamet baziri	653125112	formerly Alamet Township (ئالامەت يېزىسى / 阿拉买提乡)
Azadbagh Town	阿扎特巴格镇	Āzhātèbāgé Zhèn	ئازادباغ بازىرى	Azadbagh baziri	653125113	formerly Azadbagh Township (ئازادباغ يېزىسى / 阿扎特巴格乡)
Townships
Aral Township	阿热勒乡	Ārèlè Xiāng	ئارال يېزىسى	Aral yëzisi	653125201	
Charbagh Township	恰尔巴格乡	Qià'ěrbāgé Xiāng	چارباغ يېزىسى	charbagh yëzisi	653125202	
Yengiostang Township	英吾斯塘乡	Yīngwúsītáng Xiāng	يېڭىئۆستەڭ يېزىسى	yëngi'östeng yëzisi	653125204	
Arslanbagh Township	阿尔斯兰巴格乡	Ā'ěrsīlánbāgé Xiāng	ئارسلانباغ يېزىسى	Arslanbagh yëzisi	653125206	
Yaqaerik Township	亚喀艾日克乡	Yàkā'àirìkè Xiāng	ياقائېرىق يېزىسى	yaqa'ëriq yëzisi	653125208	
Kachung Township	喀群乡	Kāqún Xiāng	كاچۇڭ يېزىسى	kachung yëzisi	653125209	
Koshirap Township	霍什拉甫乡	Huòshílāfǔ Xiāng	قوشىراپ يېزىسى	qoshirap yëzisi	653125210	
Damsi Township	达木斯乡	Dámùsī Xiāng	دامسى يېزىسى	damsi yëzisi	653125211	
Ishkul Township	伊什库力乡	Yīshíkùlì Xiāng	ئىشقۇل يېزىسى	Ishqul yëzisi	653125213	
Pekichi Township	拍克其乡	Pāikèqí Xiāng	پەكىچى يېزىسى	pekichi yëzisi	653125214	
Kosh'erik Township	阔什艾日克乡	Kuòshí'àirìkè Xiāng	قوشئېرىق يېزىسى	qosh'ëriq yëzisi	653125216	
Dongbagh Township	墩巴格乡	Dūnbāgé Xiāng	دۆڭباغ يېزىسى	döngbagh yëzisi	653125217	
Baghawat Township	巴格阿瓦提乡	Bāgé'āwǎtí Xiāng	باغئاۋات يېزىسى	bagh'awat yëzisi	653125220	
Karasu Township	喀拉苏乡	Kālāsū Xiāng	قاراسۇ يېزىسى	qarasu yëzisi	653125221	
Ethnic township
Zerepshat Tajik Ethnic Township	孜热甫夏提塔吉克族乡	Zīrèfǔxiàtí Tǎjíkèzú Xiāng	زەرەپشات تاجىك يېزىسى	zerepshat tajik yëzisi	653125207	

== Economy ==
Yarkant County is an important producer of wheat, corn, rice, rapeseed, and cotton in southern Xinjiang. The area also produces grapes, rugs, and leather products. Industries include electronics, coal, silk, tractor repair, and cotton and cooking oil processing.

In 1885 there was about 154,600 acres (1,021,500 mu) of cultivated land in Yarkant.

== Demographics ==
Historical population
Year	Pop.	±% p.a.
2000	620,329	—
2010	762,385	+2.08%

As of 2015, 818,379 of the 851,374 residents of the county were Uyghur, 25,404 were Han Chinese and 7,591 were from other ethnic groups.

As of 1999, 95.71% of the population of Yarkant (Shache) County was Uyghur and 3.47% of the population was Han Chinese.

== Transportation ==
Yarkant is served by China National Highway 315, the Kashgar-Hotan Railway and Shache Ye'erqiang Airport.

== Historical maps ==
Historical English-language maps including Yarkant:

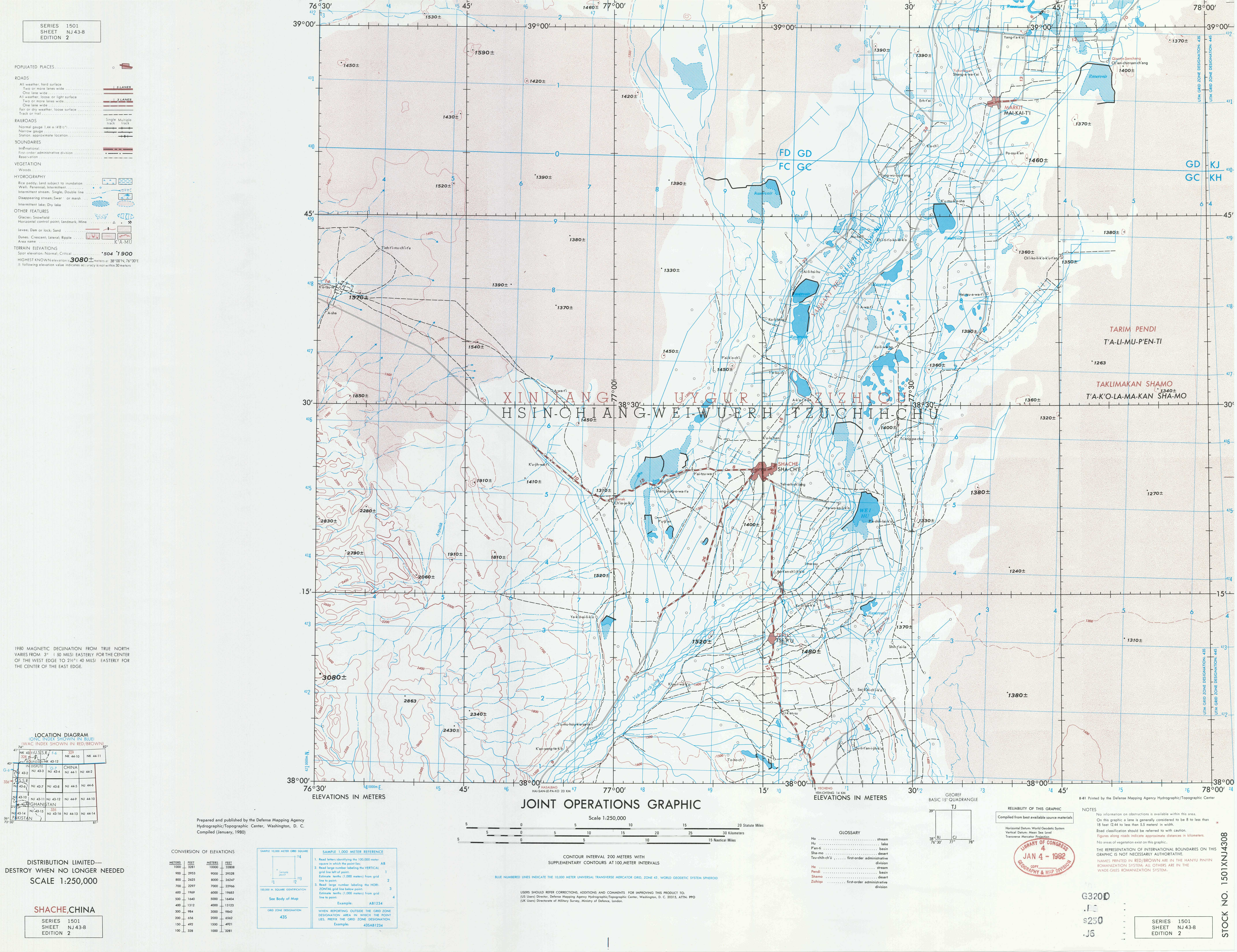
Map including Yarkant (labeled as SHACHE (SHA-CH'E) (DMA, 1980)

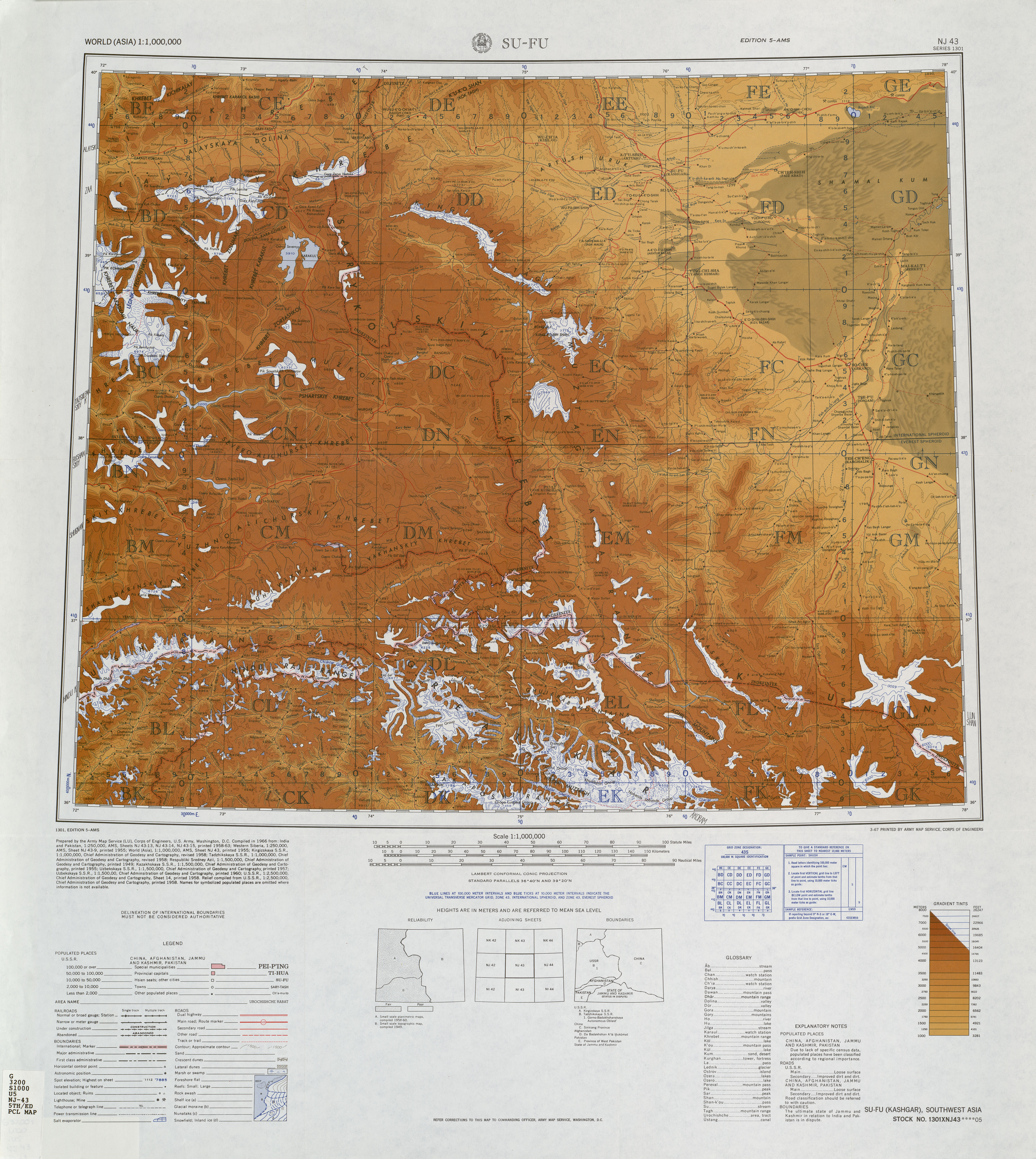
Map including Yarkant (labeled as SO-CH'E (YARKAND)) (AMS, 1966) (Note: From map: "DELINEATION OF INTERNATIONAL BOUNDARIES MUST NOT BE CONSIDERED AUTHORITATIVE")

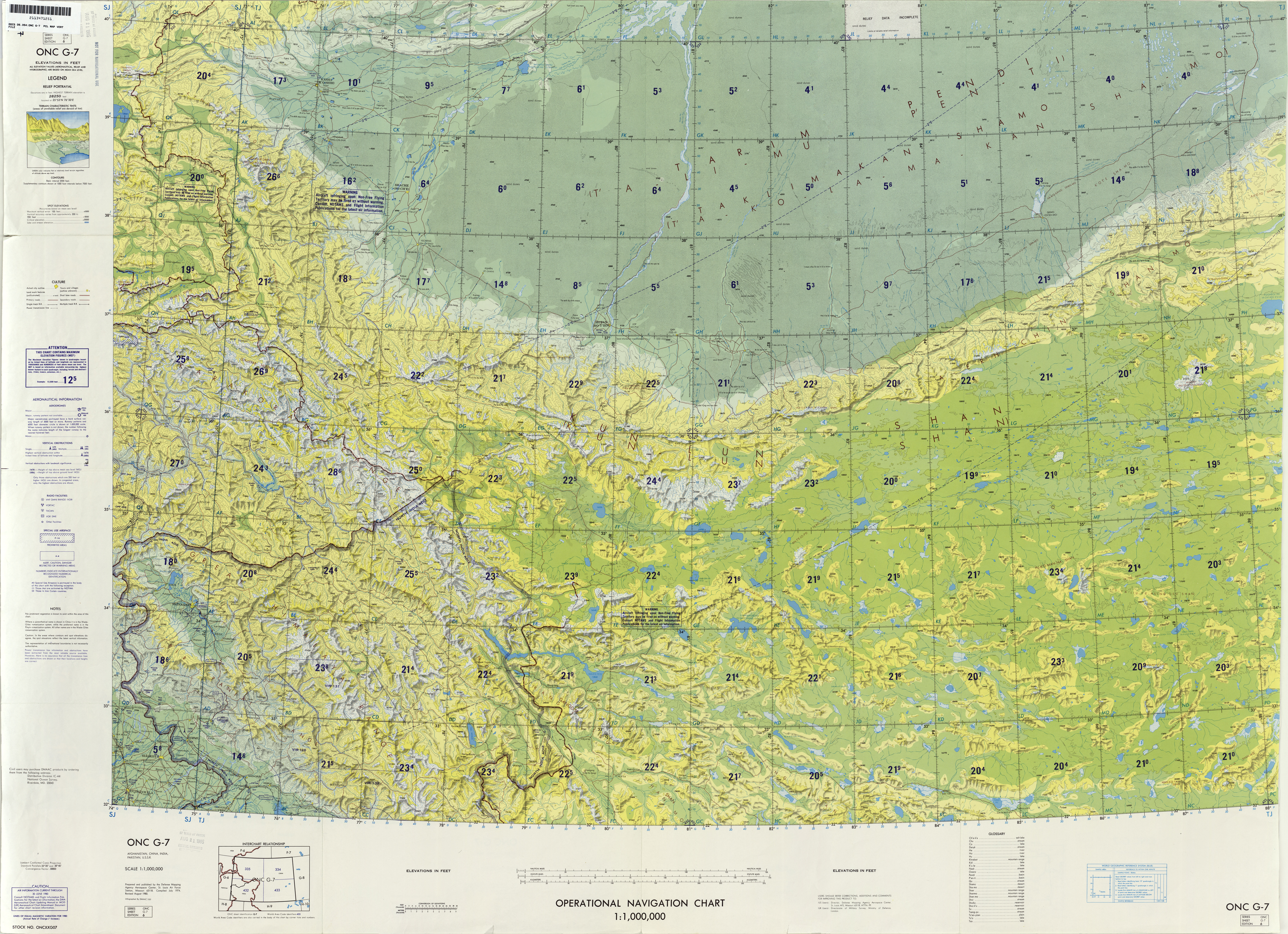
From the Operational Navigation Chart; map including Yarkant (labeled as SHACHE (SO-CH'E)) (DMA, 1980) (Note: From map: "The representation of international boundaries is not necessarily authoritative.")

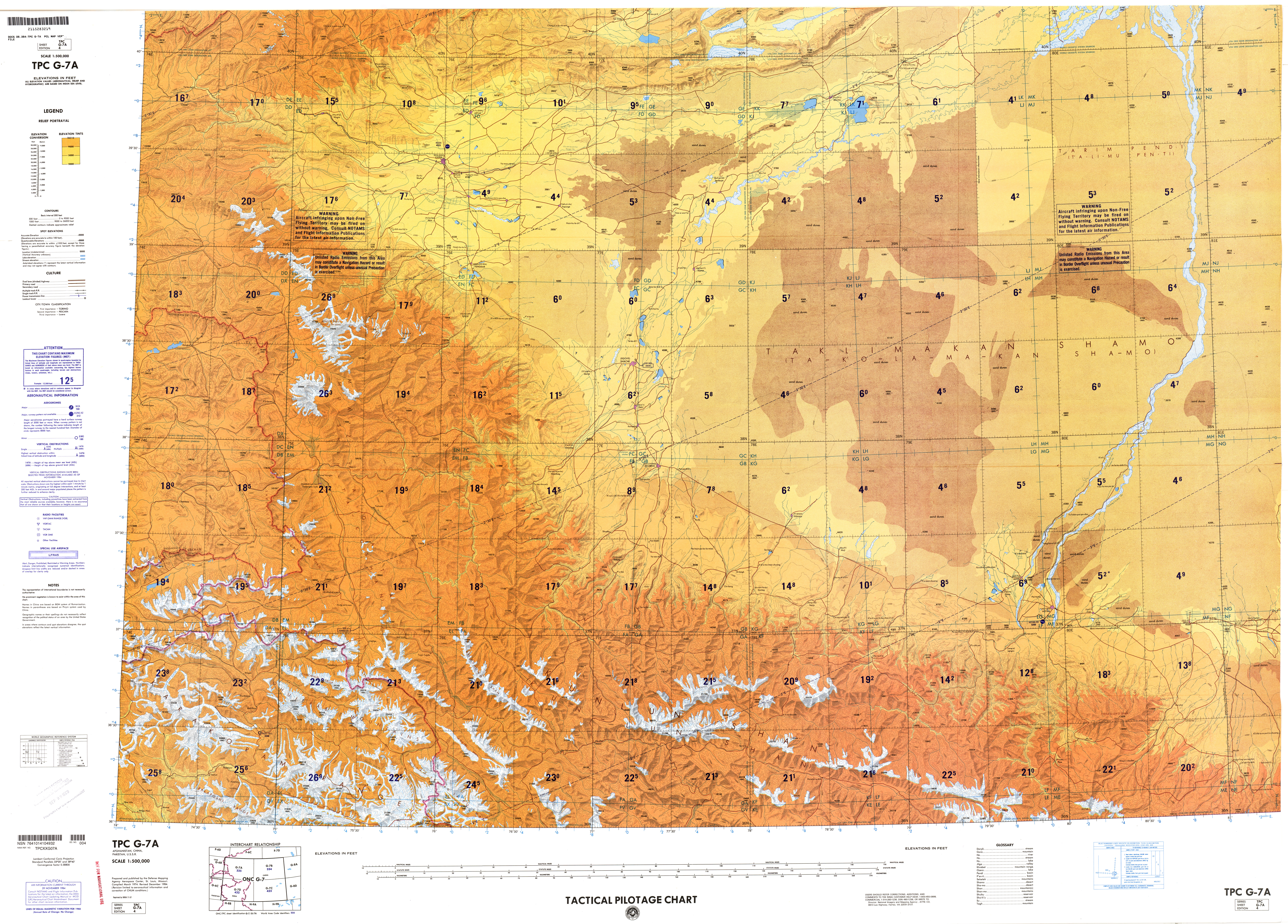
Map including Yarkant (labeled as SHACHE (SO-CH'E)) (DMA, 1984) (Note: From map: "The representation of international boundaries is not necessarily authoritative")

== See also ==
- Altyn Mosque
- Xinjiang
- Mount Imeon
- Shaksgam River
