= Music of Xinjiang =

There is much variation in the music of Xinjiang, including unique regional differences in Ili, Kashgar, Hotan and Aksu Prefecture. The southern area includes the simple songs of Hotan, the dance-oriented music of the Kuqa and the complexly rhythmic songs of the Kashgar. Ili has perhaps the most well-known musical tradition in Xinjiang, including a number of emotional tunes that are narrative in form.

== Muqam ==
The best-known musical form of the Uyghur people is the muqam, a complex suite of 12 sections related to Uzbek and Tajik forms. These complex symphonies vary wildly between suites in the same muqam, and are built on a 7-note scale. Instruments typically include the dap (a frame drum), hammered dulcimers, fiddles, and lutes; performers have some space for personal embellishments, especially in the percussion. However, there is much variation on the number and kind of instruments used in the performance of a muqam. In November 2005 the Art of Uyghur Muqam was named a Masterpiece of the Oral and Intangible Heritage of Humanity by UNESCO.

== Sanam ==
The sanam tradition is a kind of dance music popular among the Uyghurs, while spoken songs like Maida, Eytishish and Qoshaq are popular love songs with simple tunes.

== Pop music ==
The most popular performer of recent times is Turdi Akhun, who recorded most of the muqams in the 1950s. A regional popular music industry arose in the 1980s, alongside Deng Xiaoping's loosening of cultural restrictions. The resulting pop industry produced bands like Shireli, whose 1995 Trance 2 was a reggaeish version of a local folk song. Later prominent musicians include Pasha Isha, Äskär and his band Grey Wolf, Abdulla Abdurehim and Alim Jan, who appeared in such international releases as the soundtrack to Crouching Tiger, Hidden Dragon, where he plays the stringed rawap. Jan's father was also a renowned folk musician, known as Tursun Tanbur due to his skill with the tanbur, a stringed instrument like a lock-necked lute. Rock and heavy metal bands like Täklimakan and Riwäyat are also well known in Xinjiang, as is the flamenco guitar stylings of the Gipsy Kings.

== Gallery ==
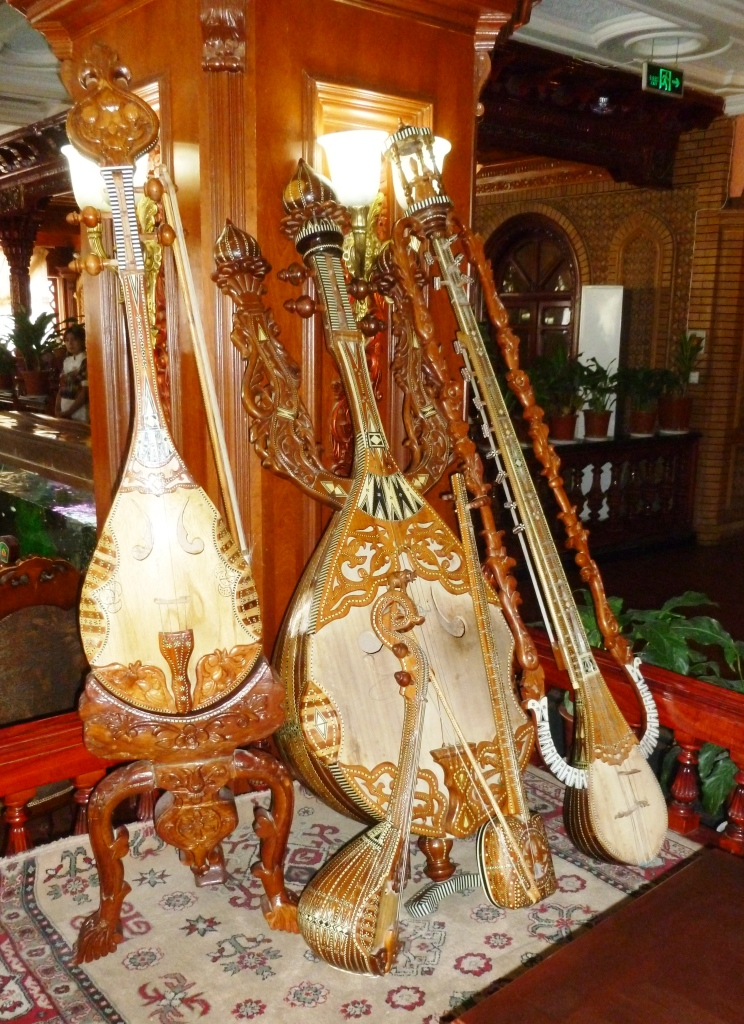
Uyghur musical instruments in Kashgar

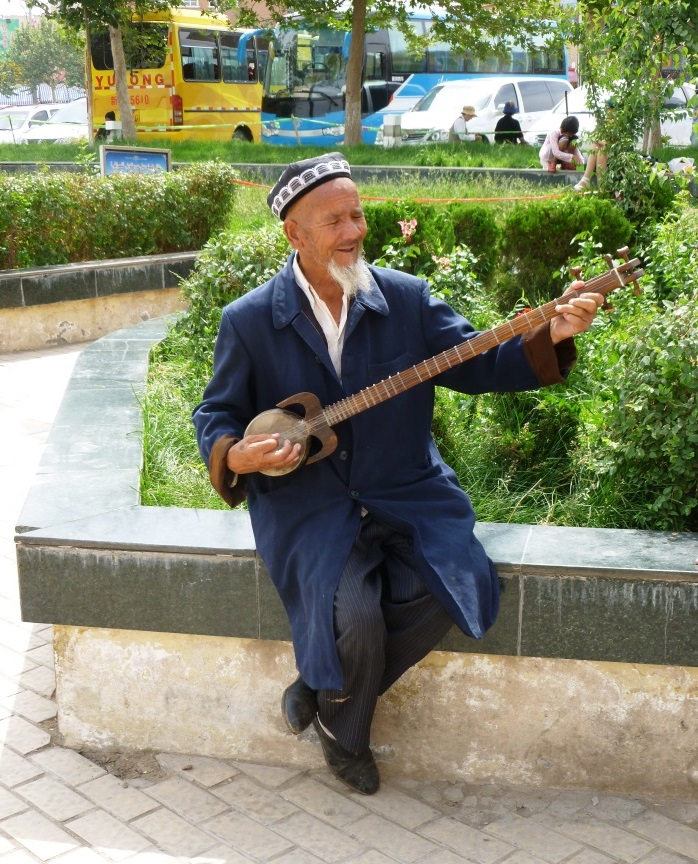
A Uyghur musician in Kashgar, 2010

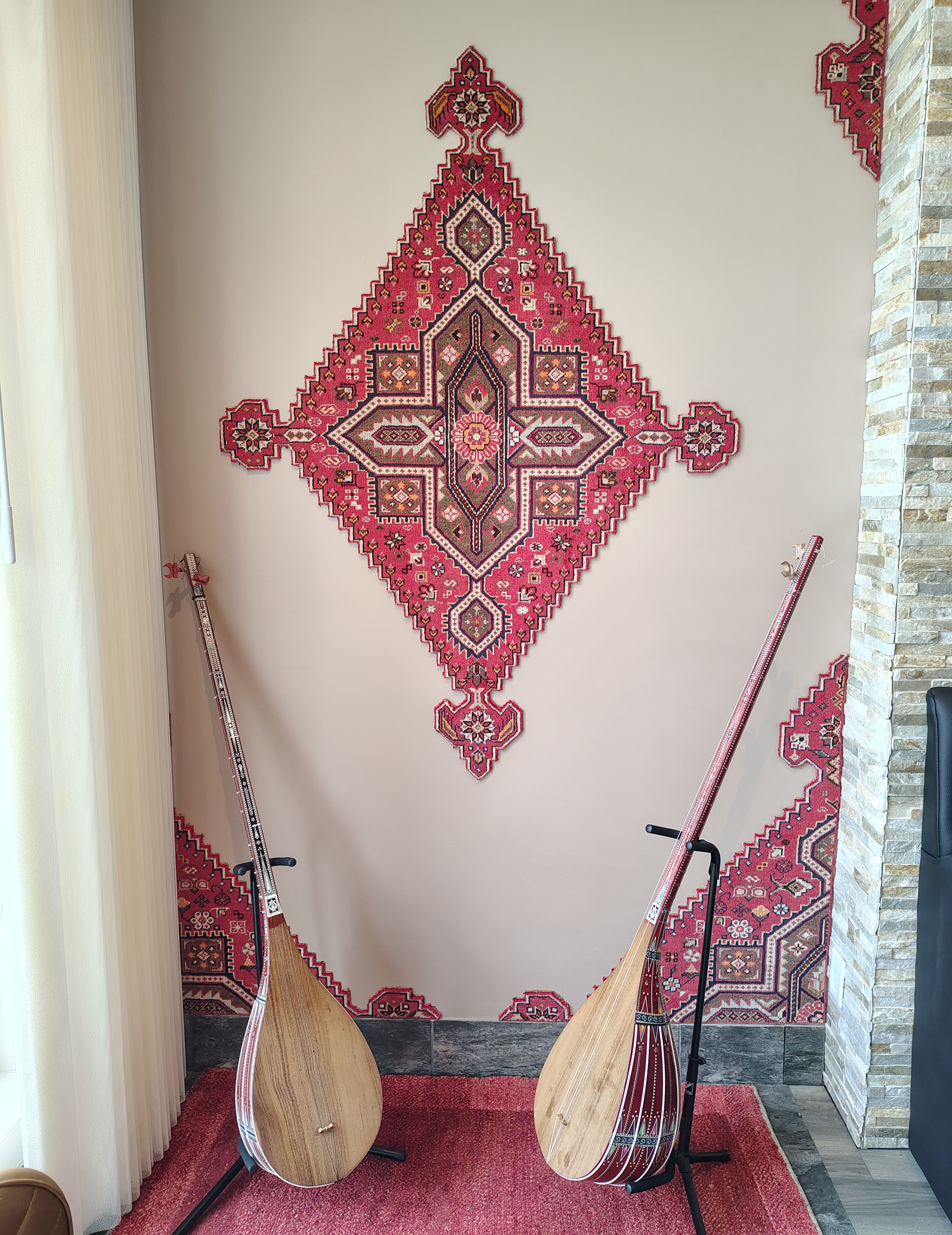
A pair of dutars used for muqams
