= Uyghurs in Kazakhstan =

Ethnic group in Kazakhstan

Uyghurs in Kazakhstan Uyghur Kazakhstanis
Total population
- 301,584 (2024)

Languages
- Uyghur, Kazakh, Russian

Related ethnic groups
- Chinese people in Kazakhstan, Turks in Kazakhstan

Uyghurs in Kazakhstan (Kazakh: Qazaqstandağy ūiğyrlar), or Uyghur Kazakhstanis (Ūiğyr Qazaqstandyktar, Uyghur: قازاقىستانلىق ئۇيغۇرلار, romanized: qazaqistanliq 'uyghurlar), form the country's fifth-largest ethnic group, according to the 2009 census.

== Migration history ==
There is a centuries-old history of population movements between the territories which are today controlled by the neighbouring Republic of Kazakhstan and the People's Republic of China. Often this has involved minorities fleeing persecution on one side of the border and finding refuge on the other.

By 1897, there were already roughly 56,000 Uyghurs in what is today Kazakhstan, according to the Russian Empire Census. In the 1940s, high-ranking Communist Party officials in the Kazakh SSR planned to create a Uyghur autonomous oblast in a large part of the territory of modern-day Almaty Province. However, as the intention of the government was to bring Xinjiang further into the Soviet orbit rather than afford local Uyghurs genuine autonomy, the plan was scrapped after the Communist victory in China in 1949. During the 1950s in China, ethnic tensions and repression of minority separatist movements led to a mass exodus from Xinjiang to the Kazakh SSR, consisting of Uyghurs, Kazakhs, Kyrgyz and Mongols. Following the Sino-Soviet split and border conflict, the Chinese government closed the Xinjiang–Kazakh SSR border, both to prevent flight by ethnic minorities, and to prevent the penetration of Soviet secret agents into China.

Uyghurs in Kazakhstan can be roughly divided into three groups based on the time of their ancestors' migration. The earliest, the yärlik ("locals"), are those who have been in the country the longest. They came to various areas of Kazakhstan, especially Semirechie, in the late 19th and early 20th century. Most of the more than 200,000 Uyghurs in Kazakhstan trace their roots to the migrations during the 1950s and 1960s. They tend to refer to themselves as kegänlär, literally "newcomers". Others used to call them kitailik ("Chinese"), but now the more commonly used term has become köchäp kegän; kitailik instead has come to refer to the latest Uyghur newcomers, those who have arrived since the 1990s (also referred to as wätändin, or "people from the homeland").

Today, Kazakhstan is often a transit point for Uyghur migration to Western Europe and North America; most Uyghurs in countries like Norway and Canada come from Central Asia rather than China.

== Social integration ==
Few of the older Uyghur migrants retain personal cross-border links with relatives or friends in Xinjiang. Those who do generally try to avoid drawing Kazakhstani government attention to these links; for example, when their relatives from Xinjiang come to visit, they obtain visas on the pretext of being cross-border traders. During perestroika and glasnost in the 1980s, the Kazakh SSR government encouraged Uyghurs to discuss and promote Xinjiang independence in a successful strategy to eradicate a popular movement for Uyghur autonomy within the Soviet Union. By 1990, the Uyghurs' shifting ethnic and political consciousness led them to build separate mosques and schools from the Dungan people (Hui people in Kazakhstan and Kyrgyzstan), with whom they had lived together in Kazakhstan since the 1950s.

Following the independence of Kazakhstan, the Kazakhstani government leveraged its tolerance for anti-Chinese government activities among the Uyghurs in Kazakhstan to extract economic investment and cooperation from China. The Kazakhstani government remains a supporter and sponsor of many Uyghur cultural and political activities. It has sponsored 64 Uyghur schools teaching 21,000 Uyghur pupils in the country, and it has allowed the dissemination of Uyghur newspapers, despite their often having an anti-Chinese slant. On the other hand, some Uyghurs in Kazakhstan have found trouble with police and local gangsters, occasionally leading to deadly battles between Uyghurs and police, most famously in the Spring of 2000 in Almaty. In June 2011, a Uyghur schoolteacher fleeing Xinjiang police in Kazakhstan on terrorism charges was deported back to China, following a request from Interpol. Such incidents, and the Uyghurs' general orientation towards Xinjiang rather than Kazakhstan, have led some Kazakh political observers to argue that the Uyghurs "threaten the national security of Kazakhstan". Some young Kazakhstani Uyghurs note that when they had received their Kazakhstan citizen ID card, they were insistently recommended by officials to state that they are Kazakhs, in order to avoid problems in future (in Kazakhstan IDs and passports there is an ethnicity column).

== Culture ==
Uyghurs who came to Kazakhstan in the 1950s and 1960s began in the 1970s to revive traditional Uyghur practises which had been lost by earlier Uyghur migrants. The revival of the meshrep movement in Kazakhstan, which aimed to reinforce religious mores and "to unite Uyghur men... under a common ideology", quickly spread to China and became so politically potent that it was banned by the Xinjiang authorities. The subsequent suppression of Uyghur nationalist demonstrations in the Ghulja Incident led to a renewed wave of Uyghur migration in Kazakhstan in 1997. Uyghurs in Kazakhstan continued to demonstrate against the Chinese government in Kazakhstan: that same year in Almaty, local Uyghurs were reprimanded by authorities for holding mass prayers in graveyards during Ramadan for the Uyghurs of Xinjiang, calling out to God "to help [the Uyghurs] endure the repression in China".

== See also ==
- Kazakh exodus from Xinjiang
- Uyghur Americans

== Sources ==
- Alekseenko, A. N. (2001), "Республика в зеркале переписей населения" (PDF), Sotsiologicheskie Issledovaniia (12): 58–62, archived from the original (PDF) on 2007-06-30
- Kamalov, Ablet (2005). "Uighurs in Post-Soviet Central Asia". In Atabaki, Touraj; Mehendale, Sanjyot (eds.). Central Asia and the Caucasus: Transnationalism and Diaspora. Routledge. pp. 154–168. ISBN 978-0-415-33260-6.
- Kamalov, Ablet (2007), "The Uyghurs as a Part of Central Asian Commonality: Soviet Historiography on the Uyghurs", in Bellér-Hann, Ildikó (ed.), Situating the Uyghurs between China and Central Asia, Anthropology and cultural history in Asia and the Indo-Pacific, Ashgate Publishing, pp. 31–46, ISBN 978-0-7546-7041-4
- Laruelle, Marlène; Peyrouse, Sebastien (2009), "Cross-border Minorities as Cultural and Economic Mediators between China and Central Asia" (PDF), China and Eurasia Forum Quarterly, 7 (1): 29–46
- Parham, Steven (2004). Narrating the Border: The Discourse of Control Over China's Northwest Frontier (PDF). Institut für Ethnologie. ISBN 978-3-906465-25-8.
- "Population Census 2009". Agency for Strategic planning and reforms of the Republic of Kazakhstan Bureau of National statistics. Archived from the original on 2021-06-20.
- Roberts, Sean R. (2007), "'The Dawn of the East': A Portrait of a Uyghur Community Between China and Kazakhstan", in Bellér-Hann, Ildikó (ed.), Situating the Uyghurs between China and Central Asia, Anthropology and cultural history in Asia and the Indo-Pacific, Ashgate Publishing, pp. 203–218, ISBN 978-0-7546-7041-4
- Sadovskaya, Elena Y. (2007), "Chinese Migration to Kazakhstan: a Silk Road for Cooperation or a Thorny Road of Prejudice?" (PDF), China and Eurasia Forum Quarterly, 5 (4): 147–170
- Solovyov, Dmitry (7 June 2011). "Kazakh deports Uighur to China, rights groups cry foul". Thomson Reuters Foundation.
- Yao, Yong-Gang; Kong, Qing-Peng; Wang, Cheng-Ye; Zhu, Chun-Ling; Zhang, Ya-Ping (1 December 2004). "Different Matrilineal Contributions to Genetic Structure of Ethnic Groups in the Silk Road Region in China". Molecular Biology and Evolution. 21 (12): 2265–2280. doi:10.1093/molbev/msh238. PMID 15317881.
- Xu, Shuhua; Jin, Li (12 September 2008). "A Genome-wide Analysis of Admixture in Uyghurs and a High-Density Admixture Map for Disease-Gene Discovery". American Journal of Human Genetics. 83 (3): 322–336. doi:10.1016/j.ajhg.2008.08.001. PMC 2556439. PMID 18760393.
