= Dolan people =

Ethnic group in Xinjiang, China

Dolan
Languages
- Uyghur

Religion
- Primarily Islam

Related ethnic groups
- Kazakh and Kyrgyz

Uyghur name
- Uyghur: دولان
Transcriptions
- Latin Yëziqi: Dolan
- Siril Yëziqi: Долан

Chinese name
- Chinese: 刀朗 / 多朗
Transcriptions
Standard Mandarin
- Hanyu Pinyin: Dāolǎng / Duōlǎng

The Dolan (Uyghur: دولان; Chinese: 刀朗 / 多朗) is a Turkic ethnic group inhabiting the Yarkand River valley, the Tarim River valley, and the Lop Nur region of Xinjiang, China. Though modern Dolan people speak Uyghur, "Dolan" can also refer to an earlier culture and civilization in the region. Little is known about the Dolan people's history; some scholars and travelers believe the Dolan of the Yarkand River valley are a Kazakh or Kyrgyz group that settled in the area during the Qing dynasty. This belief was based on their noticeably different physiognomy and language and their semi-nomadic lifestyles.

Some aspects of Dolan culture that remain to the present day include their unique style of music and dance. Their music is performed with chants, plucked and bowed string instruments, and drums. This music is now grouped into a category of Uyghur muqam music, although the instruments and musical characteristics are very different from the Twelve Uyghur Muqams. The plucked-string instruments used to perform Dolan muqam or Dolan meshrep are different from their counterparts in Uyghur folk music and usually contain a large set of sympathetic strings that resonate with certain key tones, similar to the lutes and fiddles of India and the near east.
