= Meshrep =

Uyghur cultural tradition

- UNESCO Intangible Cultural Heritage
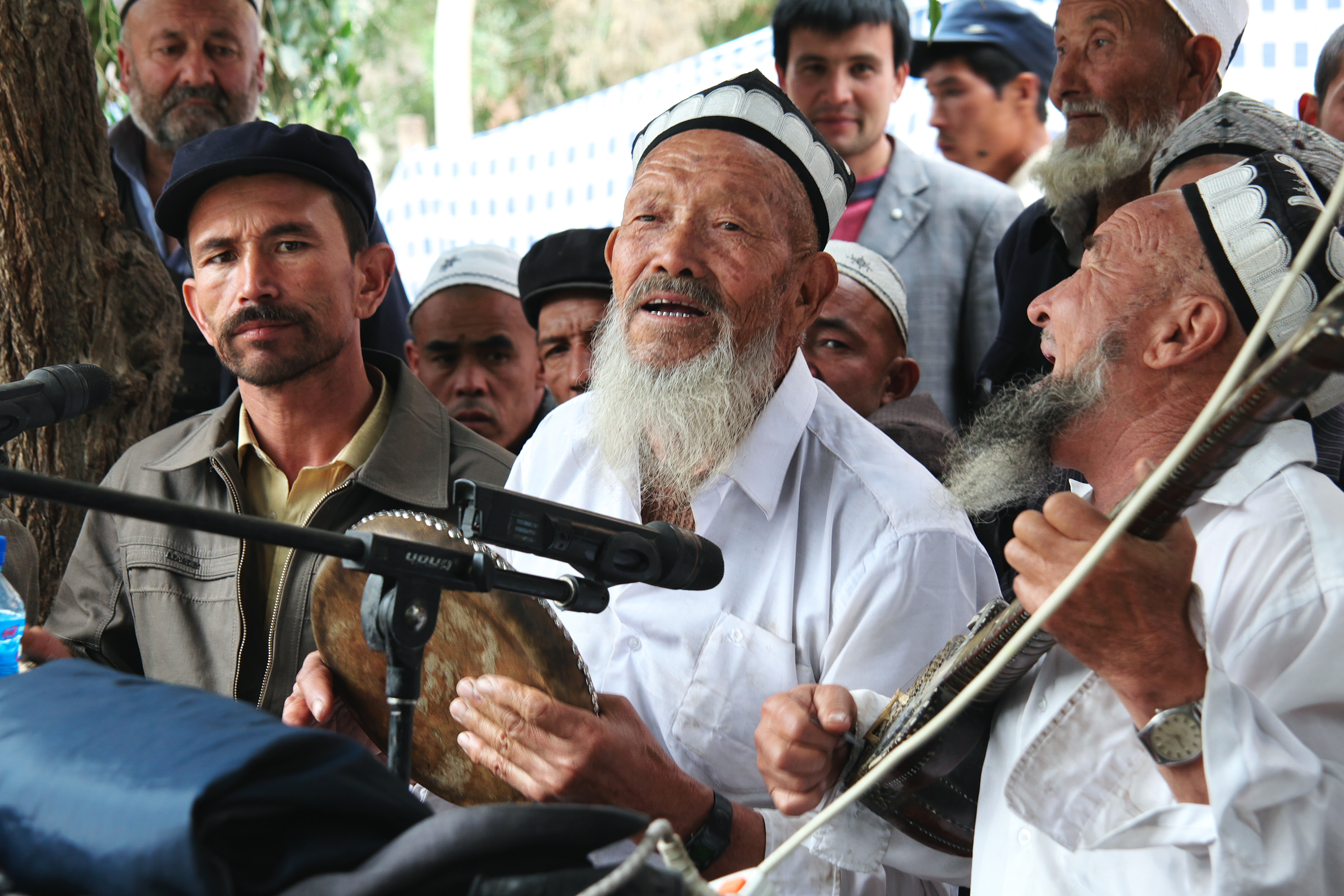
- Country: China
- Reference: 00304
- Region: Asia and the Pacific

Inscription history
- Inscription: 2010 (5th session)
- List: Need of Urgent Safeguarding

A meshrep (Uyghur: مەشرەپ, мәшрәп mäxräp; Chinese: 麦西热甫; pinyin: màixīrèfǔ, lit. "harvest festival") is a traditional male Uyghur gathering that typically includes "poetry, music, dance, and conversation within a structural context". Meshreps typically include music of the muqam variety and ad-hoc tribunals on moral questions. Meshrep are usually held in mosques, public gathering sites, the courtyard of one of the members' family home.

== Cultural significance ==
Traditionally, Meshrep functions as a communal gathering of music, dance, poetry and moral adjudication. Although some of the more-widely documented modern versions—particularly those formalised in the 1990s—are predominantly male-oriented, the practice itself is not inherently restricted to men. According to the UNESCO Intangible Cultural Heritage listing, “All Uyghur people are the practitioners of Meshrep. There is no limit to the number of participants for each event. Everyone, man or woman, young or old, is allowed to take part in the practice by singing, dancing, guessing riddles or playing games.” Ethnomusicological field-work further documents that in some regions of Xinjiang women and men actively participate together in Meshrep gatherings.

== Traditional structure ==
The practice of meshrep is diverse among Uyghur communities, but there are some commonalities. Traditionally, meshrep were only held on the harvest, and on weddings, circumcisions, and girls' comings of age. Each meshrep consists of a leader (yigit bashi, an older man), a disciplinarian (passip begi), and 30 younger men (ottuz oghul), who sit on a carpet according to seniority. The broader tradition (per UNESCO's description) do not restrict participation to men only, in fact, in many regional forms, "Everyone, man or women, young or old, is allowed to take part in the practice by singing, dancing, guessing riddles or playing games". In some regional variation, the meshreps were primarily male bonding events, the women and children of the host's family were to stay inside the house and only interact with the men to bring them food or to otherwise serve them. Music is an essential component of the meshrep, and during the meshrep, men play progressively faster muqam melodies on the dutar while others compete to see who could perform whirling circle dances for the longest period of time. Some meshrep also feature songs, skits, and lectures from religious leaders. Aside from the entertainment value of the meshrep, these groups also formed part of the informal governance structure of Uyghur communities, and still do outside of China. Inside the meshrep, the moral transgressions of the men, such as polygamy, are publicly scolded and the men humiliated by slapping or caning. There is no limit on the length or attendance of the meshrep, and the Dolan Uyghurs were famed for hosting meshrep "attended by hundreds of people, and often last[ing] the whole night".

== Ili Youth Meshrep ==
The meshrep is attested to in modern Chinese literature as early as 1942, in the socialist realist play Gulnissa, where the meshrep is portrayed as a secular, coeducational youth culture. During that time, the meshrep in Yining (Ghulja) consisted of musical performances and "informal court hearings" for community dissidents. Uyghurs in Kazakhstan began practicing the meshrep as early as the 1970s. After China's economic reforms in the 1980s, a middle class began to develop in China, and ordinary Chinese had more leisure time and discretionary income. At the same time, political and religious controls were loosening, and Chinese officials encouraged the building of mosques and the veiling of women. Contemporary developments in the region, including the global Islamic revival and the independence of the Soviet Central Asian states in 1992, inspired Uyghur independence feeling and the establishment of militant groups like the East Turkestan Islamic Movement (ETIM).

== Olturax gatherings ==
In the 1990s, the social and political life in the city of Yining (Ghulja) was predominantly secular. In Yining, young Uyghur men would informally gather, usually once a week, to drink baijiu, perform poetry and music, and otherwise socialize. These meshrep gatherings, called olturax, grew to perform important political and economic functions in Yining life.

== Rise of Islamist and nationalist focus ==
Islamic youth groups organized in the evenings grew in opposition to and eventually eclipsed the olturax, also serving "the foci for Uyghur resistance to Chinese rule". Calling themselves "meshreps", the clubs criticized the secular nature of the olturax and the alcohol consumption within as un-Islamic. These meshreps, which have been compared to the Catholic Knights of Columbus, were more formal than the olturax: tasked with providing "moral guidance", they kept strict membership lists and organized regular meetings, wherein members would read passages from the Quran. Meshrep practitioners were held to a strict code of Islamic conduct in their daily lives, including abstinence from alcohol and hashish. Initiation into the meshrep involved hazing rituals, and once admitted, men who did not continue to meet the group's standards of Muslim piety were given corporal punishment, such as caning, or petty fines by the group. These practices diverged significantly from the meshrep's secular tradition, and thus revived the meshrep in Yining with "new religious and nationalist meanings".

Initially, both social reformers and the local government supported the meshreps, as they provided an outlet for young Uyghur men in an environment rife with unemployment, alcoholism, drug abuse, and gambling. But as the popularity of meshrep grew, meshrep groups became more assertive in their opposition to the government's goals. In the spring and summer of 1995, meshreps started a campaign of boycotts and intimidation against shops that sold liquor in Yining and the surrounding villages. Fearing the meshrep's political potential, Xinjiang authorities banned the gatherings in July 1995. However, most meshrep groups continued to operate in secret, or delegated their morals enforcement duties to legal neighborhood watch groups. When a football game organized by underground meshrep teams was canceled by authorities, the meshrep mobilized several hundred Uyghur men to march across government offices and to gather in Yining's main plaza, although there was no violence and the crowd dispersed after a few days. Authorities then drew a distinction between "healthy, traditional" meshrep and an "illicit" political and religious meshrep, encouraging the former but cracking down on the latter. In 1997, a national anticrime campaign resulted in the arrests of meshrep leaders and talibes in Yining, leading to mass riots called the Ghulja Incident.

== Modern meshrep ==
After the Ghulja Incident, local antigovernment Uyghurs migrated to Almaty in Kazakhstan, where they continued to practice the meshrep as they had in Ili. In November 2010, UNESCO approved China' nomination of the meshrep to the List of Intangible Cultural Heritage in Need of Urgent Safeguarding. Due to Chinese government's crackdown on Uyghurs since 2016, it was increasingly difficult for local Uyghur communities to organize their own meshrep, other than government-organized meshrep performance aimed at tourists.
