= Ghulja incident =

1997 violent event in Xinjiang

Ghulja Incident
- Part of the Xinjiang conflict
- Date: February 3, 1997; 29 years ago February 3–5, 1997
- Location: Yining, Xinjiang, China
- Caused by: Ethnic tension
- Goals: Autonomy for the Uyghurs
- Methods: Protests, rioting
- Result: Crowd dispersed by police

Parties
Uyghur activists	Chinese government

Casualties
- Deaths: 10 including a police officer (official reports); ~200 (dissident claims)
- Injuries: 198
- Arrested: 1,600+ (dissident claims)

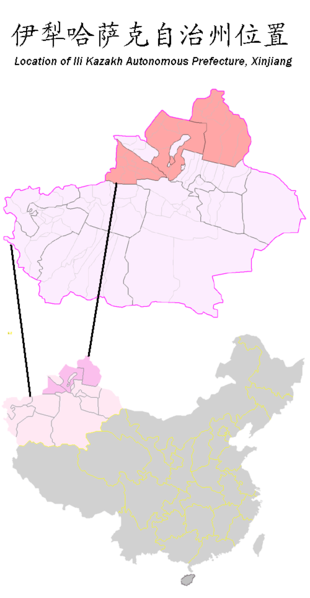
Ghulja is the capital of Ili Kazakh Autonomous Prefecture

The Ghulja, Gulja, or Yining incident (Chinese: 伊寧事件, Yīníng Shìjiàn), also known as the Ghulja massacre, was the culmination of the Ghulja protests of 1997, a series of protests in the city of Yining—known as Ghulja in Uyghur—in the Xinjiang autonomous region of China.

== Background ==
In 1962, the People's Liberation Army and paramilitary forces from the Xinjiang Production and Construction Corps (XPCC) were called in to violently put down a demonstration of approximately 2,000 Uyghurs in Ghulja following the Great Chinese Famine that called for the overthrow of the Chinese Communist Party. The Chinese government blamed the Soviet Union for the demonstration. In 1969, Hong Kong newspaper The Star reported an uprising in Ghulja involving 4,000 Uyghurs, allegedly with Soviet support.

In the 1990s, Xinjiang was subject to armed clashes and terrorist attacks by secessionist militants particularly the Eastern Turkestan Islamic Movement (ETIM). These include 1992 Ürümqi bombings, with attacks escalating in 1995.

In 1996, the government of the People's Republic of China initiated a "Strike Hard" campaign to crack down on suspected separatist activity. The Uyghur meshrep cultural tradition became a target of the "Strike Hard" campaign. The campaign targeted purported "illegal religious activities."

== Incident ==
In early February 1997, during Ramadan, two Uyghur religious students (talips) were arrested, which resulted in a clashes and dozens of arrests. On February 5, 1997, demonstrations occurred with crowds chanting "Allahu Akbar" and "Independence for Xinjiang". Local Uyghurs reported that the march came in response to a government prohibition against gathering for the meshrep.

According to a local police official, the crowd initially numbered in the dozens, but quickly swelled in size. According to Sanlian Lifeweek, a video of the incident taken at the time reportedly showed individuals chanting similar slogans as well as burning their identification documents.

At noon, the demonstrations escalated as the crowd, numbering at about 1,000, began to riot, attacking police and local residents, as well as burning shops and vehicles.

The crowd was reportedly dispersed by police using clubs, water cannon, and tear gas. Official reports stated that 10 people, including a police officer, were killed. 198 people including security forces were injured. Uyghur human rights groups stated that approximately 200 were killed.

== Aftermath ==
According to Sanlian Lifeweek, a number of participants in the demonstration and riots had arrived from Kashgar and Hotan. Some of the participants in the incident fled from China to Afghanistan and Pakistan, but were detained by the U.S. military and handed over to the Pakistani government during the U.S. invasion of Afghanistan, and were imprisoned in Guantanamo Bay detention camp in Cuba. During incarceration, Chinese officials have visited Guantanamo to participate in interrogations. Shortly after the massacre, protests by Uyghur exiles were held outside the Chinese embassies in Almaty and Bishkek.

Exile sources claimed that 1,600 people were arrested in a crackdown carried out in the years immediately following the incident in Xinjiang. Rebiya Kadeer, who was present during the Ghulja incident, went on to become leader of the World Uyghur Congress.

Following the massacre, the Chinese government executed the leaders of the protest and imprisoned 27 for their roles, according to official sources. According to Radio Free Asia, many Uyghurs who were arrested or detained on charges related to the incident have been sent to re-education camps since 2017. Witnesses of the incident as well as family members, friends, and associates of those involved have also been allegedly rounded up and imprisoned.

== See also ==
- Xinjiang conflict
- Barin uprising
- List of massacres in China
