= Omar Akhun =

Uyghur composer and musical performer

Omar Akhun is a Uyghur composer and musical performer best known for his Muqam melodies, often composing in 12 muqams. He and Turdi Akhun in the 1950s recorded songs using this form and made it more systematic.
