= Sanlian Lifeweek =

Chinese weekly magazine

- Cover of the 16 September 2019 issue, featuring Bilibili's official mascots "33" and "22", and Vocaloid virtual singer Hatsune Miku
- Editor-in-chief: Li Honggu
- Frequency: Weekly
- Circulation: 820 thousand
- First issue: January 14, 1995
- Company: China Publishing Group Corp.
- Country: China
- Based in: Chaoyang, Beijing
- Language: Simplified Chinese
- Website: www.lifeweek.com.cn
- ISSN: 1005-3603

Sanlian Lifeweek (Chinese: 三联生活周刊) is a news magazine based in Beijing, China, known for its in-depth reporting and cultural commentary. Its slogan is "A magazine and the life it advocates" (Chinese: 一本杂志和他倡导的生活).

== History ==
=== 1995–2000 ===
In 1993, Sanlian Lifeweek was founded by SDX Joint Publishing Company in Beijing. In December 1994, the magazine released its pilot issue, and on January 14, 1995, the 100th anniversary of Zou Taofen's birth, the magazine was officially launched with the first issue. It positioned itself as a continuation of the Life magazine founded by Zou in 1926.

The magazine's first editor-in-chief was Qian Gang, with Yang Lang serving as deputy editor. In September 1995, Zhu Wei—formerly of Rural Women magazine, where Yang's wife worked—joined Sanlian Lifeweek as editor-in-chief. Starting in 1996, the magazine was published biweekly. The focus during this period was cultural criticism, covering all aspects of everyday life and offering commentary on current affairs from a cultural perspective. Notable features included Wang Xiaobo's column "Late-Born Chats" and the book review section "Bestsellers and Rankings."

=== 2001–2004 ===
In 2001, after the 9/11 attacks, the magazine transitioned into a weekly publication with a growing emphasis on news reporting. It launched timely and in-depth series, such as five consecutive issues on the 9/11 attacks, and investigative reports on the Chinese officialdom, including "Corrupt Official Li Jizhou," "The Guangxi Corruption Network," and "The Power Circle of Corrupt Officials in Hebei."

=== 2005–2009 ===
The magazine evolved from a news-focused weekly into a more comprehensive publication with broader scope. For instance, in 2005, it ran a series revisiting historical details to mark the 60th anniversary of the end of WWII; in 2006, it produced a cultural geography series following the opening of the Qinghai-Tibet Railway.

=== 2010–present ===
In January 2014, the magazine published a 31-page cover story on Bo Guagua written by Li Jing, aided by Bo family confidant and Taiwanese-American businessman Larry Cheng. The report included the exclusive that John Garnaut, the Beijing reporter for The Sydney Morning Herald, acted as Wang Lijun's interpreter when he defected to the US Consulate in Chengdu, a detail questioned by other media. In late 2014, after nineteen years as editor-in-chief, Zhu Wei stepped down and was succeeded by Li Honggu. In 2017, Sanlian Lifeweek carried out digital media transformation, and the new media revenue of the magazine accounted for 80% by 2022.
