= Turdi Akhun =

Uyghur composer and musical performer

Turdi Axun (right)

Turdi Akhun (simplified Chinese: 吐尔迪‧阿洪; traditional Chinese: 吐爾迪‧阿洪; pinyin: Tǔ'ěrdí Āhóng; 1881–1956), sometimes spelled Turdu Ahun, was a traditional Uyghur folk musician in the Xinjiang region. He was born into a family with a rich musical history and could perform his music completely from memory, even into his 70s. Prior to his death he, along with Omar Akhun, made a recording of 12 muqams and was recognised as the foremost exponent of this genre.
