= Muqam =

Melody type from Central Asian culture

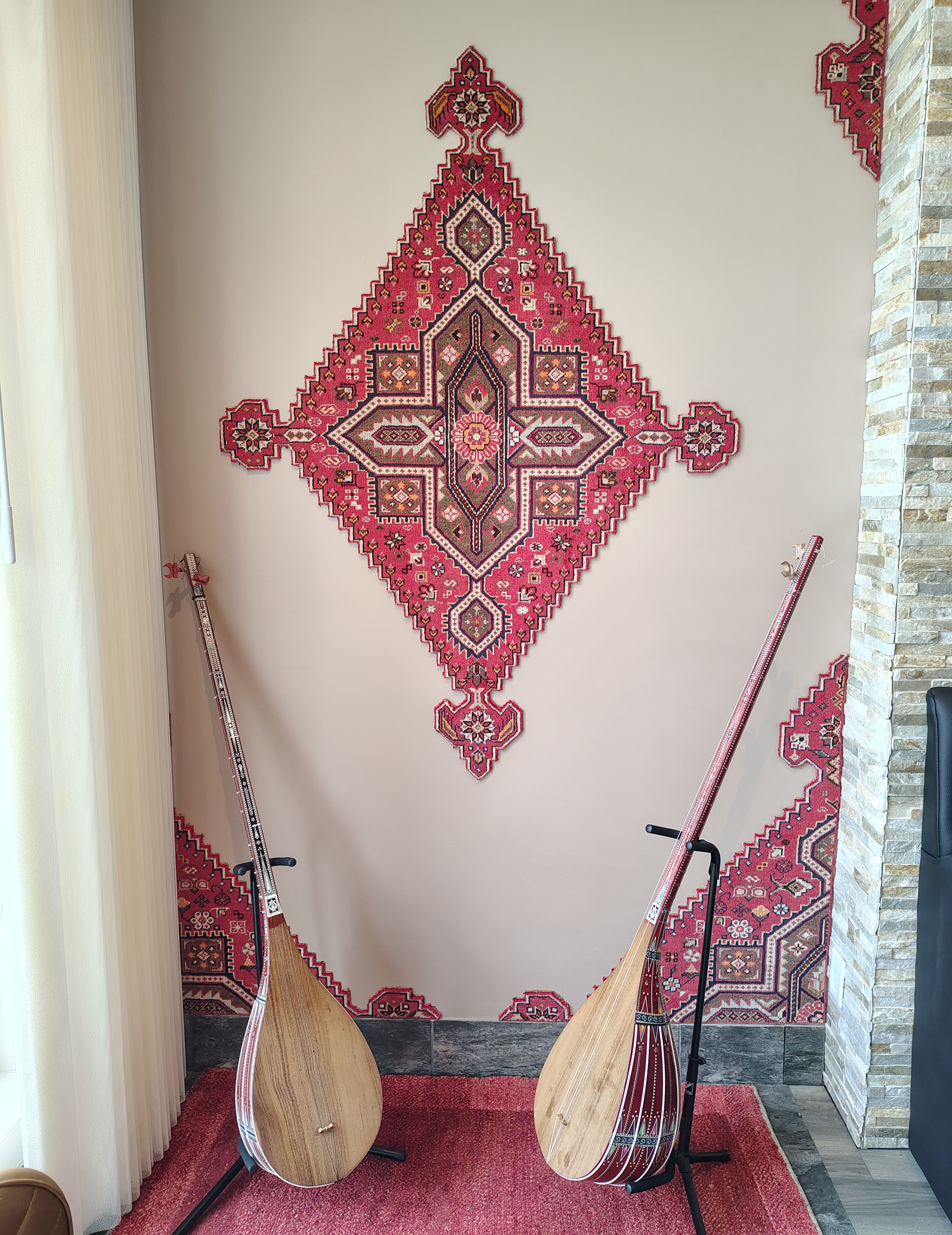
A pair of dutars used for muqams

A muqam (Uyghur: مۇقام, муқам; Chinese: 木卡姆; pinyin: mùkǎmǔ) is the melody type used in the music of the Uyghurs, that is, the musical mode and set of melodic formulas used to guide improvisation and composition.

== The Twelve Muqams ==
The Twelve Muqams are:

1. Rak (راك مۇقامى, Рак; 拉克, Lākè)
2. Chebbiyat (چەببىيات مۇقامى, Чәббият; 且比亚特, Qiěbǐyǎtè)
3. Sëgah (سىگاھ مۇقامى, Сегаһ; 斯尕, Sīgǎ)
4. Chahargah (چاھارگاھ مۇقامى, Чаһаргаһ; 恰尔尕, Qiàěrgǎ)
5. Penjigah (پەنجىگاھ مۇقامى, Пәнҗигаһ; 潘尔尕, Pāněrgǎ)
6. Öz'hal (ئۆزھال مۇقامى, Өжал; 乌孜哈勒, Wūzīhālēi)
7. Ejem (ئەجەم مۇقامى, Әҗәм; 艾且, Àiqiě)
8. Oshaq (ئوشاق مۇقامى, Ушшақ; 乌夏克, Wūxiàkè)
9. Bayat (بايات مۇقامى, Баят; 巴雅提, Bāyǎtí)
10. Nawa (ناۋا مۇقامى, Нава; 纳瓦, Nàwǎ)
11. Mushawrek (مۇشاۋىرەك مۇقامى, Мушаврәк; 木夏吾莱克, Mùxiàwúláikè)
12. Iraq (ئىراق مۇقامى, Ирақ; 依拉克, Yīlākè)

Each of the Twelve Muqams consists of a main section that begins with a long free rhythm introduction, followed by pieces with characteristic rhythmic patterns that gradually increase in speed. Each muqam consists of three parts, including naghma, dastan and mashrap. These pieces are arranged in the same sequence in each muqam, although not all muqams have the same pieces. These parts are known as teze, nuskha, small seliqe, jula, senem, large seliqe, peshru and tekit. Some have an associated instrumental piece known as a merghul ("decoration") following it. Although each named piece has its characteristic rhythmic pattern, the melodies differ, so each piece is generally known by the muqam and the piece: for example, "the Rak nuskha" or "the Segah cula". There are about 20 to 30 pieces of songs and musics, which might take approximately 2 hours to finish performing. It will take about 24 hours to perform all pieces of the Twelve Muqams.

After the main section, there are two other sections, originally associated with other musical traditions, but included in muqams by performers such as Turdi Akhun and therefore included in the present tradition of the Twelve Muqams. The Dastan section includes songs from several of the romantic dastan narratives found widely in Central and South Asia and the Middle East. Each dastan song is followed by an instrumental merğul. The Meşrep section consists of more lively dance songs that were originally connected with the performances of sama by dervish musicians of Turkistan.

== History and preservation ==
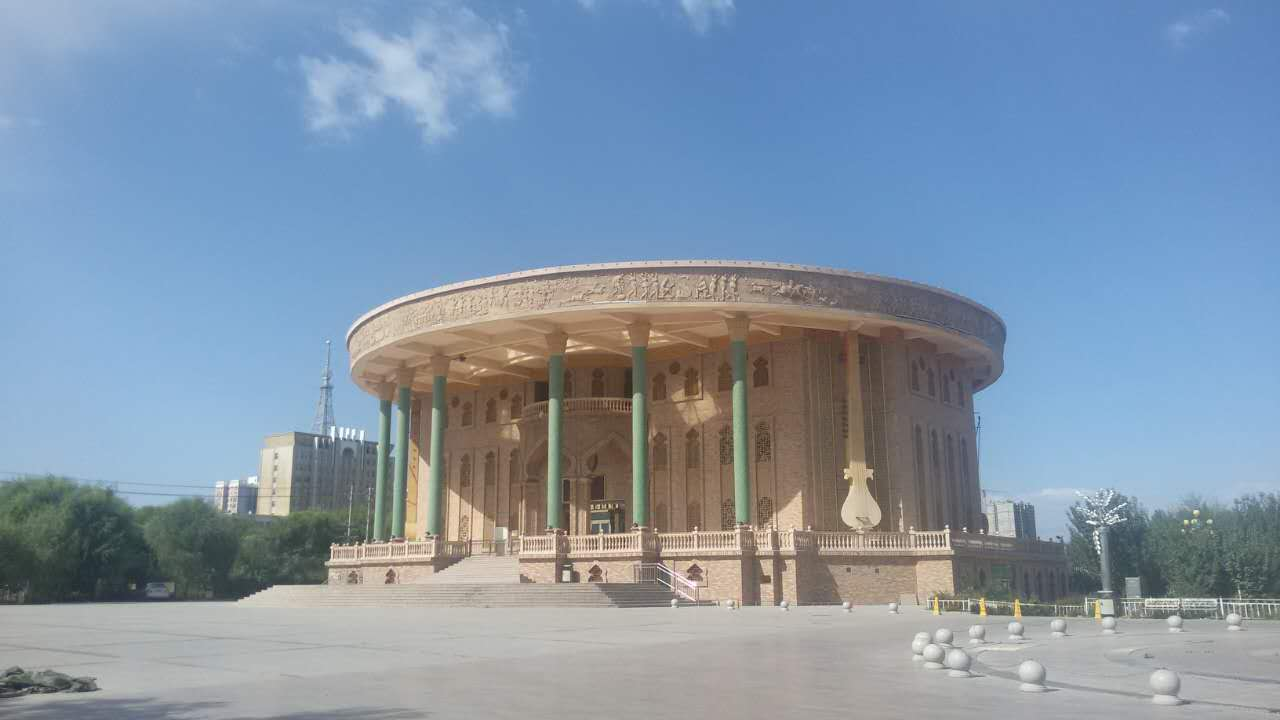
The Muqam Museum in Hami (Kumul), Xinjiang

Some Chinese scholars believe that the Uyghur muqam can be traced back to the "Great Western Region Melody" (Chinese: 西域音乐; pinyin: Xīyù yīnyuè) developed during the Han (206 BCE–220 CE) and Tang (618–907) dynasties, from which it was imported and enjoyed in the courts of Central China. It is however more likely that it was influenced by the Arabic maqam modal system that has led to many musical genres among peoples of Eurasia and North Africa. Uyghurs have local muqam systems named after their historic oasis towns which are currently in Xinjiang, such as Dolan, Ili, Kumul and Turpan. The most fully developed at this point is the Western Tarim region's Twelve Muqams, which are now a large canon of music and songs recorded from the traditional performers Turdi Akhun and Omar Akhun among others in the 1950s and edited into a more systematic system. Although the folk performers probably improvised their songs as in Turkish taksim performances, the present institutional canon is performed as fixed compositions by ensembles.

The concubine Amannissa Khan of the Yarkent Khanate (1526–1560) is credited with collecting and thereby preserving the Twelve Muqams, while reshaping its style to draw more from the indigenous traditions of the Tian Shan mountains and purging it of the Perso-Arabic. After the Chinese Communist Revolution, the state commissioned musicians Wan Tongshu and Turdi Akhun to record the Muqams on tape, so that it could not be lost. They published their first album in 1960. From 2004 to 2008, over 7,000 performers have collaborated in a Chinese state project to proliferate seminars, research projects and recordings of the Muqam.

In 2005, UNESCO designated The Uyghur Muqam of Xinjiang as part of the Intangible Heritage of Humanity.

== See also ==
- Persian traditional music
