= Yogh =

Letter of the Latin alphabet

Ȝ
- Ȝ ȝ

Usage
- Writing system: Latin script
- Type: Alphabetic
- Language of origin: Middle English language Latin language
- Sound values: [g] [j] [ŋ] [ɣ] [x] [ç] [i] [ð] [dʒ]

History
Development
T14
        - Γ γ
          - 𐌂 c
            - C c
              - G g
                - Ᵹ ᵹ
                  - Ȝ ȝ
- Time period: ~1150 to ~1500
- Sisters: C G Г ג ج ܓ ࠂ 𐡂 Ꝿ Գ գ
- Transliterations: ch, g, gh, j, ng, y

Other
- Associated graphs: ch, gh, g, j, ng, y, z
- Writing direction: Left-to-Right

The letter yogh (uppercase: Ȝ, lowercase: ȝ; Middle English: ȝogh) is a Latin script letter that was used in Middle English and Older Scots, representing y (/j/) and various velar phonemes. It descends from the Insular G, the form of the letter g in the medieval Insular script, ᵹ.

In Middle English writing, tailed z came to be indistinguishable from yogh.

In Middle Scots, the character yogh became confused with a cursive z and the early Scots printers often used z when yogh was not available in their fonts. Consequently, some Modern Scots words have a z in place of a yogh, e.g. the placename Drumelzier, pronounced /drəˈmɛljər/.

Yogh is shaped similarly to the Cyrillic letter З and the Arabic numeral 3, which are sometimes substituted for the character in online reference works. There is some confusion about the letter in the literature, as the English language was not standardised at the time. Capital yogh is represented in Unicode by code point U+021C Ȝ LATIN CAPITAL LETTER YOGH, and lower case yogh by code point U+021D ȝ LATIN SMALL LETTER YOGH.

== Pronunciation ==
Capital yogh (left), lowercase yogh (right)

In Modern English, "yogh" is pronounced /jɒɡ/, /jɒx/ using short o or /joʊɡ/, /joʊk/, /joʊx/, using long o.

It stood for /ɡ/ and its various allophones—including [ɡ] and the voiced velar fricative [ɣ]—as well as the phoneme /j/ (which is written ⟨y⟩ in modern English orthography).

In Middle English, it also stood for the phoneme /x/ and its allophone [ç] as in niȝt [niçt] 'night', and also represented the phonemes /j/ and /dʒ/. Sometimes yogh stood for /j/ or /w/, as in the word ȝoȝelinge [ˈjowəlɪŋɡə] 'yowling'.

In Middle Scots, it represented the sound /j/ in the clusters /lj/, /ŋj/ and /nj/, written lȝ and nȝ.

In medieval Cornish manuscripts, yogh was used to represent the voiced dental fricative [ð], as in ȝoȝo, now written dhodho, pronounced [ðoðo].

== History ==
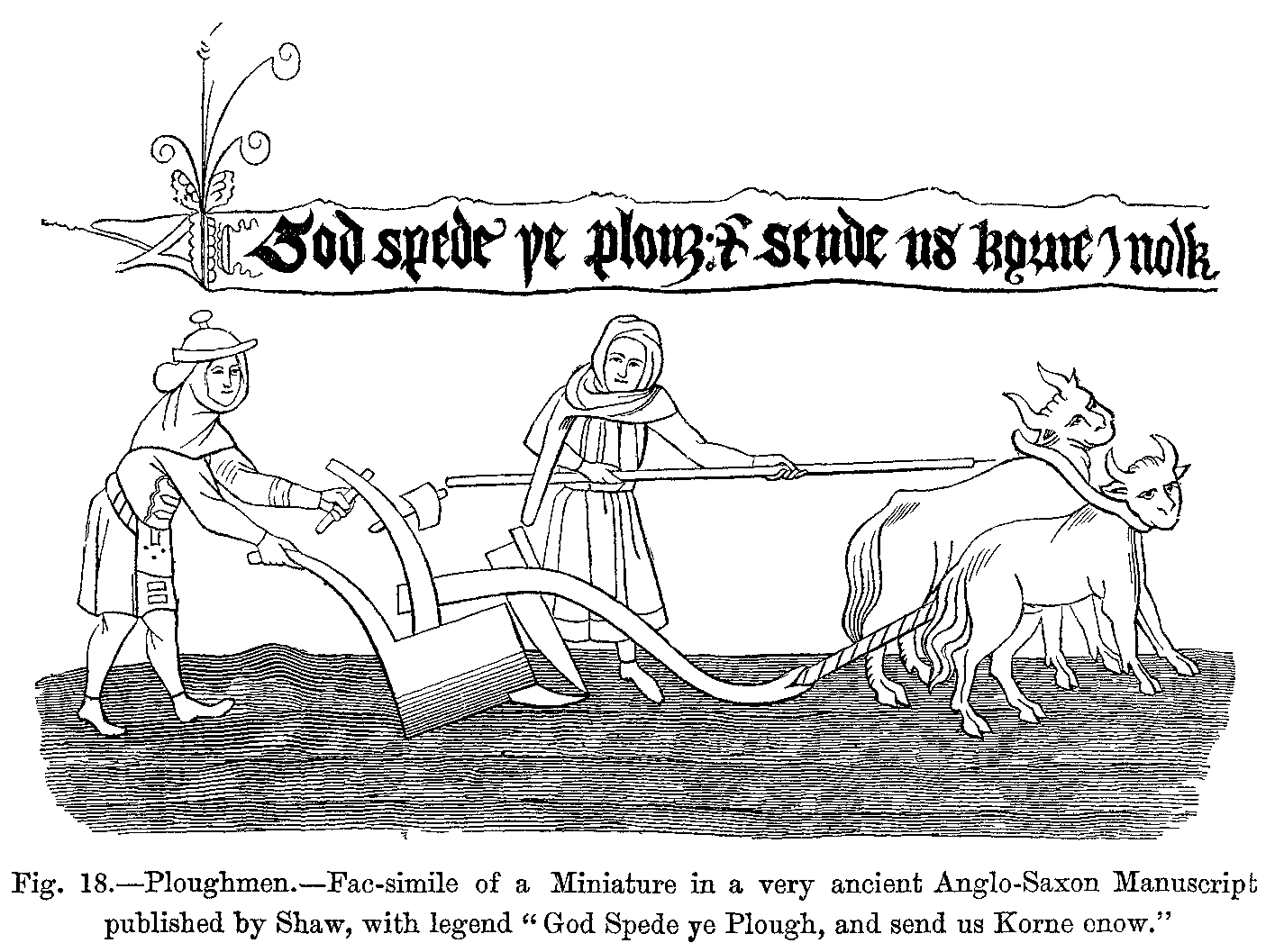
Yogh used for /x/ in Middle English: God spede þe plouȝ & sende us korne inow ("God speed the plough and send us corn enough")

=== Old English ===
The original Germanic g sound was expressed by the gyfu rune in the Anglo-Saxon futhorc (which is itself sometimes rendered as ȝ in modern transliteration). Following palatalization, both gyfu and Latin g in Old English expressed the /j/ sound before front vowels. For example, "year" was written as gear, even though the word had never had a g sound (deriving from Proto-Germanic *jērą).

With the re-introduced possibility of a /ɡ/ sound before front vowels, notably in the form of loanwords from the Old Norse (such as gere from Norse gervi, Modern English gear), this orthographical state of affairs became a source of confusion, and a distinction of "real g" (/ɡ/) from "palatalized g" (/j/) became desirable.

In the Old English period, ᵹ was simply the way Latin g was written in the Insular script introduced at the Christianisation of England by the Hiberno-Scottish mission. It only came to be used as a letter distinct from g in the Middle English period, where it evolved in appearance into ȝ, now considered a separate character.

=== Middle English ===
In the 14th century, the digraph gh arose as an alternative to yogh for /x/, and eventually overtook yogh in popularity; still, the variety of pronunciations persisted, as evidenced by cough, taught, and though. The process of replacing the yogh with gh was slow, and was not completed until the arrival of printing presses (which lacked yogh) in England around the end of the fifteenth century. Not every English word that contains a gh was originally spelled with a yogh: for example, spaghetti is Italian, where the h makes the g hard (i.e., [ɡ] instead of [dʒ]); ghoul is Arabic, in which the gh was /ɣ/.

The medieval author Orm used this letter in three ways when writing Early Middle English. By itself, it represented /j/, so he used this letter for the y in "yet". Doubled, it represented /i/, so he ended his spelling of "may" with two yoghs. Finally, the digraph of ȝh represented /ɣ/.

In the late Middle English period, yogh was no longer used: niȝt came to be spelled night. Middle English re-imported G in its French form for /ɡ/ (As a further side note, French also used ⟨y⟩ to represent /j/ in words like voyage and yeux).

=== Scots ===
In words of French and Gaelic origin, the Early Scots palatal consonant /ɲ/ had become /nj/ or in some cases /ŋj/, and the palatal consonant /ʎ/ had become /lj/ by the Middle Scots period. Those were variously written nȝ(h)e, ngȝe, ny(h)e or ny(i)e, and lȝ(h)e, ly(i)e or lyhe (cf. gn and gli in Italian). By the Modern Scots period the yogh had been replaced by the character z, in particular for /ŋj/, /nj/ (nȝ) and /lj/ (lȝ), written nz and lz. The original /hj/ and /çj/ developed into /ʃ(j)/ in some words such as Ȝetland or Zetland for Shetland. Yogh was also used to represent /j/ in words such as ȝe, ȝhistirday (yesterday) and ȝoung but by the Modern Scots period y had replaced yogh. The pronunciation of MacKenzie (and its variant spellings) (from Scottish Gaelic MacCoinnich [maxˈkʰɤɲɪç]), originally pronounced [məˈkɛŋjiː] in Scots, shows where yogh became z. Menzies Campbell is another example.

=== After the development of printing ===
In Middle Scots orthography, the use of yogh became confused with a cursive z and the early Scots printers often used z when yogh was not available in their fonts.

The yogh glyph can be found in surnames that start with a Y in Scotland and Ireland; for example the surname Yeoman, which would have been spelled Ȝeman. Sometimes, the yogh would be replaced by the letter z, because the shape of the yogh was identical to some forms of handwritten z.

In Unicode 1.0, the character yogh was mistakenly unified with the quite different character ezh (Ʒ ʒ), and yogh itself was not added to Unicode until version 3.0.

== Examples of Middle English words containing a yogh ==
These are examples of Middle English words that contain the letter yogh in their spellings.

- niȝt ("night")
- yȝe ("eye")
- ȝha ("yea")
- yhalȝed ("hallowed")
- ȝhat ("gate")
- ȝhe(i)d(e) (past tense of "go", which in ME is often "yede")
- yȝ(e/i)ld(e), yȝened (past participles of "yield" and "yean")
- yherber(e)ȝed ("harboured")
- ȝhere ("ear")
- yhyȝed ("hied, hastened")
- ȝiefte ("gift")
- ȝif ("if")
- ȝise ("yes")
- ȝista(i/y) ("yesterday")
- ȝister- ("yester-")
- ȝit(e) ("yet")
- ȝive ("give" or "if")
- wrouȝte ("wrought")

== Scots words with ⟨z⟩ for ⟨ȝ⟩ ==
=== Placenames ===
- Adziel – a farm steading near Strichen in Aberdeenshire that lends its name to nearby Adziel Wood and Adziel House;
- Ardgilzean – a farm steading and prehistoric cairn north of Perth and nearby Argilzean Cottage, Eastfield of Ardgilzean and Ardgilzean Plantation;
- Auchenbainzie – a farm steading and hill near Penpont in Dumfries and Galloway;
- Auchenzeoch – a farm steading near Fordoun in Aberdeenshire;
- Auchilhanzie – a B-listed farmhouse near Fowlis Wester in Perth and Kinross with the same specific as neighbouring Milquhanzie Hill;
- Aucholzie – a settlement in Glenmuick, Aberdeenshire from the Scottish Gaelic: achadh coille meaning "the field of the wood", also the adjacent stream Allt Cholzie and nearby ruined farmstead Mill of Aucholzie;
- Balzeordie and Castletoun of Balzeordie – two farms near Brechin in Angus and a neighbouring wood Balzeordie Den, site of a minor hillfort known by the same name;
- Barledziew and Lower Barledziew – two farm steadings in the Machars, Galloway beside a teardrop-sharped drumlin, Barledziew Hill;
- Barncailzie Wood – a Wood in Galloway that lends its name to a former hunting lodge;
- Ben Chonzie – a mountain in Perthshire;
- Benziecott – a place on Westray, Orkney;
- Binzean – a location in Glen Shee with two farmsteadings Wester Binzian and Easter Binzian;
- Branzet Moss – a moor next to a ruined farm steading, Branzet on Bute;
- Branziert – a suburb of Killearn in Stirlingshire;
- The Branziet – pronounced bringit (IPA /brɪŋɪt/), a farm and settlement near Bardowie, East Dunbartonshire that lends its name to the Branziet Burn and Branziet Bridge;
- Bunzion – pronounced bunion (IPA /bʌnjən/), Lower and Upper Bunzion are farms in the Parish of Cults, Fife;
- Cadzow – the former name of the town of Hamilton, South Lanarkshire; the word continues in modern use in many street names and elsewhere including Cadzow Castle, and the nearby village of Kilncadzow;
- Cairnerzean Fell – a hill in Dumfries and Galloway that features numerous cairns, two hut circles and may lend its name in anglicised form to the nearby village Cairnryan;
- Calzeat – an obsolete place name from the Parish of Broughton, Glenholm and Kilbucho in Peeblesshire which, since 1971, has lent its name to textile manufacturer Calzeat and Company Limited;
- Calziebohalzie – a former farmstead in Stirlingshire with a rare instance of a word containing two yoghs, from the Scottish Gaelic: Coille Buachaille (Scottish Gaelic pronunciation: [kʰɤʎəˈpuəxɪʎə]);
- Carzield – part of Kirkmahoe parish, Dumfriesshire that lends its name to a Roman fort, a Medieval Tower house and a farm and stables;
- Cockenzie – pronounced cockennie (IPA [koˈkɪni]), from the Scottish Gaelic: Cùil Choinnich meaning "cove of Kenneth", a major town in East Lothian, also the name of a minor farm steading near Dalgarven Mill – Museum of Ayrshire Country Life and Costume in North Ayrshire;
- Conzie Castle – a ruined castle built upon the Bognie estate in Aberdeenshire;
- Cozie – previously West Cozie, the name given to a row of now ruined cothouses on Chapelton of Menmuir farm in Angus;
- Colzium Estate – now pronounced as written, a historic estate and mansion house built on the banks of the Colzium Burn near Kilsyth;
- Colquhalzie House – a country house in Perthshire;
- Corriemulzie – part of the Mar Lodge Estate in Aberdeenshire, the Linn of Corriemulzie is a waterfall on the Corriemulzie burn;
- Crailzie Hill – a hill in the Scottish Borders;
- Cultezeoun – a farm in Carrick, South Ayrshire from the Scottish Gaelic: cùl tighe Euain meaning "the back of Euan's house", the home of Margaret McMurray;
- Culzean – pronounced culain (IPA /kʌˈleɪn/), a historic castle in Ayrshire run by the National trust for Scotland;
- Culzie Lodge – a farm steading on Loch Glass in Kiltearn Parish – recently used as a name for the nearby 'Pink House' of viral internet fame;
- Cunzierton – a locality in the east of Oxnam parish in the Scottish Borders which lends its name to Cunzierton Farm, Cunzierton Burn, Cunzierton Hill and the hill fort atop it;
- Dalchonzie – a place on the banks of the River Earn in Perthshire that lends its name to a country house, farm and power station and the nearby hill Bioran Dalchonzie and a former railway station;
- Dalhenzean Lodge – a Bed & Breakfast run from a historic farmsteading in Glen Shee, Perthshire;
- Dalmunzie – pronounced dalmoney (IPA /dɑːlˈmʌni/), a historic castle in Perthshire repurposed as a hotel;
- Dalrulzion – sometimes spelled Dalrulzian, the site of a hut circle and cairnfield in Perthshire that is used as an archeological archetype – 'Dalrulzion-type hut circles' – and nearby Bridge of Dalrulzion, Mains of Dalrulzion, Middleton of Dalrulzion and Dalrulzion House;
- Dalzean – a dwelling house above Penpont on the course of the Scaur Water in Dumfriesshire that lends its name to the Dalzean Burn and the adjacent hill Dalzean Snout;
- Dalzellowlie, Dallzellowlie or Dalziellily – a colliery located between Maybole and Girvan in South Ayrshire whose deposits were contested between the estates of Culzean and Kilhenzie and were set on fire more than once, burning for many decades and becoming known as Burning Hills;
- Drumelzier – pronounced drumellier (IPA /drʌmˈɛljɛr/), a village in the Tweed Valley that shares its name with Drumelzier Castle, Drumelzier Kirk, the Drumelzier Burn and Drumelzier Law;
- Drunzie and Drunzie Feus – two adjacent settlements near Glenfarg in Perth and Kinross;
- Easter Dalziel – pronounced deeyel (IPA /diːˈɛl/) from Gaelic Dail Gheal ([t̪alˈʝal̪ˠ]) meaning "white field";
- Enzean – a farm steading on the outskirts of Monymusk in Aberdeenshire;
- Enzie – a settlement in Moray that lends its name to the Braes of Enzie, a farm steading Burnside of Enzie and Enzie railway station;
- Edzell – now pronounced as written, a village in Angus and the nearby Hill of Edzell, Edzell Castle, Mains of Edzell farm and the nearby settlement Edzell Woods;
- Falgunzeon – a farm in Dumfries and Galloway that lends its name to the adjacent Falgunzeon Hill;
- Finzean – pronounced fingen (IPA /ˈfɪŋən/), an area in rural Aberdeenshire;
- Finzeuch – a settlement near Keig in Aberdeenshire;
- Hill of Foulzie – near Macduff in Aberdeenshire and four surrounding farm steadings Foulzie, Backhill of Foulzie, Over Foulzie and Newton of Foulzie;
- Funzie – pronounced finnie (IPA /ˈfɪni/), a village on Fetlar that lends its name to nearby Funzie Ness, Funzie Bay, Haa of Funzie, Loch of Funzie, Muckle Funziegord Geo and the historic dividing wall Funzie Girt;
- Gartwhinzean – a historic settlement near Crook of Devon in Perth and Kinross;
- Glenrazie – a small settlement near Newton Stewart, Dumfries & Galloway which lends its name to Glenrazie Woods to the north;
- Glenzier – pronounced glinger (IPA /ˈɡlɪŋər/), a village in Dumfries & Galloway which lends its name to Glenzierfoot and the Glenzier Burn;
- Helzie – pronounced helly, a place name used for four distinct areas in Orkney, perhaps eponymously named for Helgi an influential Westray householder featured in the Orkneyinga Saga:
  - Dale of Helzie – an area of pasture in Deerness on Mainland;
  - Doun Helzie – a beach on Sanday, Orkney;
  - Helzie and Sands of Helzie – an abandoned dwelling place and adjacent beach on Westray;
  - Helziegetha – a dwelling on Wyre;
- Henzie Burn – a burn, a tributary to the River Almond, Perth and Kinross which originates in a high corrie, Corry Henzie;
- Inzie Head – a headland on the Aberdeenshire coast south east of St Combs;
- Kailzie Gardens – a historic walled garden named after Kailzie Hill and Kailzie Hope near Kirkburn, Scottish Borders;
- Kenzie's Tower – a minor hillock on Flotta in Orkney;
- Kilchenzie or Kilkenzie – a small settlement on the Kintyre peninsula, from Choinnich (Scottish Gaelic pronunciation: [ˈxɤɲɪç]), the genitive of Coinneach (Scottish Gaelic pronunciation: [ˈkʰɤɲəx]) "Kenneth";
- Kilhenzie Castle – pronounced kilhinny, a late medieval, baronial keep in Carrick, South Ayrshire, also from Choinnich and which takes its name from the surrounding features Kilhenzie Burn, Kilhenzie Wood and the Back Hill of Kilhenzie;
- Kilmacfadzean – a prehistoric burnt mound and sheepfold above New Luce in Galloway;
- Kilrenzie, a remote settlement in the parish of Colmonell in South Ayrshire;
- Kirkgunzeon – pronounced kirkgunion (IPA /kɜːrkɡʌnjən/), a village and civil parish in Dumfries and Galloway that lends its name to the adjacent stream Kirkgunzeon Lane and the nearby Isles of Kirkgunzeon Farm and Cottage;
- Largizean – a row of three prehistoric standing stones and an adjacent farmstead near Kilchattan Bay on the Isle of Bute;
- Lenzie – now pronounced as written (IPA /ˈlɛnzɪ/), but previously lenyie (IPA /ˈlɛnjɪ/), a village near Glasgow;
- Lenziemill – a sizeable industrial district of Cumbernauld;
- Malzie or Culmalzie, (sometimes Culmazie) – a site in The Machars in Dumfries & Galloway somewhat dubiously supposed to relate to Saint Mhaillidh which lends its name to the Water of Malzie – a tributary of the River Bladnoch and Corsemalzie – a nearby country house hotel;
- Menzie Cleugh – a gully or ravine in the sea cliff near Coldingham in the Borders reputedly derived from the name of a person who resided there;
- Menzion – a village in the Borders;
- Menzieshill – an area of Dundee;
- Monzie – pronounced money (IPA /ˈmʌni/), from the Gaelic Moighidh, "a level tract", a parish in Perthshire near Crieff which lends its name to Monzie Castle and the Falls of Monzie;
- Monzievaird – with competing etymologies but supposed to be from the Gaelic Maghbhard, "plain of the bards", a place in Perthshire — the site of the Massacre of Monzievaird and which lends its name to Loch Monzievaird;
- Moonzie – a parish in Fife generally supposed to be from Gaelic and meaning "hill of the deer";
- Mozie Law – a hilltop in the Cheviot Hills whose summit lies on the Anglo-Scottish border;
- Munzie Well – a holy well dedicated to St Mungo in Whitelee Forest, East Renfrewshire, also Munzie Burn and Munzie Hill;
- Onziebust – an RSPB nature reserve on the Isle of Egilsay, Orkney and a second location on Wyre — the two identically named areas face each other across the Rousay Sound;
- Portencalzie – a small settlement near Kirkcolm on the Rhins of Galloway;
- Pinzarie – pronounced pingery, a farm steading and ruined farm steading, Old Pinzarie underneath Pinzarie Hill upstream from Tynron on the course of the Shinnel Water;
- Pitcalzean – an obscure archaeological enclosure near the village of Nigg, Highland that lends its name to nearby Pitcalzean House;
- Queenzieburn – pronounced queenieburn (IPA /kwiːnibɜːrn/), a village in Lanarkshire;
- Rannagulzion House – a country house near Blairgowrie in Perthshire;
- Raiziehill – a suburb of Bathgate and nearby Raiziehill Wood;
- Ruchazie – now pronounced as written (IPA /rʌxˈheɪzɪ/), a district of Glasgow;
- Strath Mulzie and Corriemulzie – a broad glen and the river that runs through it in Sutherland that lends its name to the Corriemulzie Lodge & Estate;
- Soilzarie – a small settlement in the parish of Kirkmichael in Glen Shee, Perthshire;
- Swinzie Burn – a tributary to the Annick Water in East Ayrshire;
- Terringzean Castle – pronounced tringan (IPA /ˈtrɪŋən/) but with a variety of recorded spellings, a castle in East Ayrshire;
- Ulzieside – an estate and farm near Sanquhar in Dumfries and Galloway;
- Velzie – a small settlement on Fetlar.

See also:

- Lochranza – a village and sea loch on the Isle of Arran the ⟨z⟩ in this instance deriving from Scottish Gaelic: Loch Raonasa, but nonetheless mistaken as a yogh with written referents to Loch Ranga found in the 19th century

==== Placenames standardised without ⟨ȝ⟩ ====
- Cu' Dheis – a township on Tiree previously found as Cowzeise;
- Yieldshields – now written as pronounced although previously found as Zuildshields;
- Yell – found archaically as Zell in early modern texts;
- Shetland – known commonly as Zetland in the nineteenth century – Zetland County Council being the official name of the county from 1890 until 1975 resulting in Shetland postcodes beginning with the letters ZE.

=== Surnames ===
- Cadzow – see placename;
- Dalziel – pronounced deeyel (IPA /diːˈɛl/) or dehyell, from Gaelic Dail Gheal ([t̪alˈʝal̪ˠ]); also spelled Dalyell and Dalzell;
- Gilzean – pronounced gilain, a variant of Maclean, from Gaelic MacGilleEathain ([maxkʲɪˈʎe.ɛɲ]). However, many now pronounce the 'z', including footballer Alan Gilzean;
- McFadzean – pronounced macfadyen (IPA /məkˈfɑːdjɪn/), scotticised version of the Gaelic surname MacPhaidin also found, primarily in Ireland, anglicised as MacFadden;
- MacKenzie – now pronounced as written, though as late as 1946 George Black recorded the original form pronounced makenyie (IPA /məˈkɛŋji/), from the Gaelic MacCoinnich ([maxˈkʰɤɲɪç]) as standard;
- Menzies – most correctly (for example, by Sir Robert Menzies) pronounced mingis (IPA /ˈmɪŋɪs/), now also pronounced with /z/;
- Winzet – pronounced winyet (IPA /ˈwɪnjət/).

Surnames no longer in common usage:

- Alzie – a surname, historically found in Renfrewshire, Glasgow and Lanarkshire that fell into disuse in the early nineteenth century. Possibly an early form of Algie;
- Layamon – now written as pronounced although frequently rendered with a yogh as Laȝamon up to the early 1900s in literary referents;
- Malzie – a now defunct surname possibly related to the Dumfries & Galloway placename;
- MacCalzeane, MazCalzean or McCalzean – a historical rendering of McLean;

See also:

- Gilhaize – a seemingly invented surname used for the eponymous protagonist of John Galt's Ringan Gilhaize

=== Miscellaneous nouns ===
- Assoilzie – pronounced with a silent z – in Scots law: acquittal or ruling in favour of the defender in a civil matter;
- Brulzie – with a variety of spellings including bruilzie and broolzie – a commotion or noisy quarrel – possibly related to Brulyie to broil;
- Capercailzie – the Scots spelling of capercaillie (IPA /ˌkæpərˈkeɪli/) from the Gaelic capall-coille ([kʰaʰpəl̪ˠˈkʰɤʎə]) meaning "forest horse";
- Gaberlunzie – most correctly pronounced gaberlunyie (IPA /ɡæbərˈlʌnji/) but now often pronounced as written, a licensed beggar;
- Spulzie — pronounced spooly with a variety of spellings including spuilzie and spulyie, both the taking of movable goods and the term for a process of restitution for such crimes;
- Tailzie – pronounced [ˈteɪli] in Scots law: a term for an entailed estate/interest in one, defunct since 2000;
- Tuilzie – now standardised to Tulyie a struggle or fight, from the Old French 'toeillier' meaning to strive, dispute or struggle;
- Ulzie – pronounced ooly, oil. Found in reference to "The Ulzie Ball" held by Longforgan weavers once daylight had returned sufficiently to allow work without the use of oil lamps.

== In Egyptology ==
A Unicode-based transliteration system adopted by the Institut Français d'Archéologie Orientale suggested the use of the yogh ȝ character as the transliteration of the Ancient Egyptian "aleph" glyph:

A

The symbol actually used in Egyptology is, two half-rings opening to the left. Since Unicode 5.1, it has been assigned its own codepoints (uppercase U+A722 Ꜣ LATIN CAPITAL LETTER EGYPTOLOGICAL ALEF, lowercase U+A723 ꜣ LATIN SMALL LETTER EGYPTOLOGICAL ALEF); a fallback is the numeral 3.

== See also ==
- Old English Latin alphabet
- Thorn (letter)
- Eth
