= Castle Cluggy =

- Ochtertyre, Perth and Kinross, Scotland
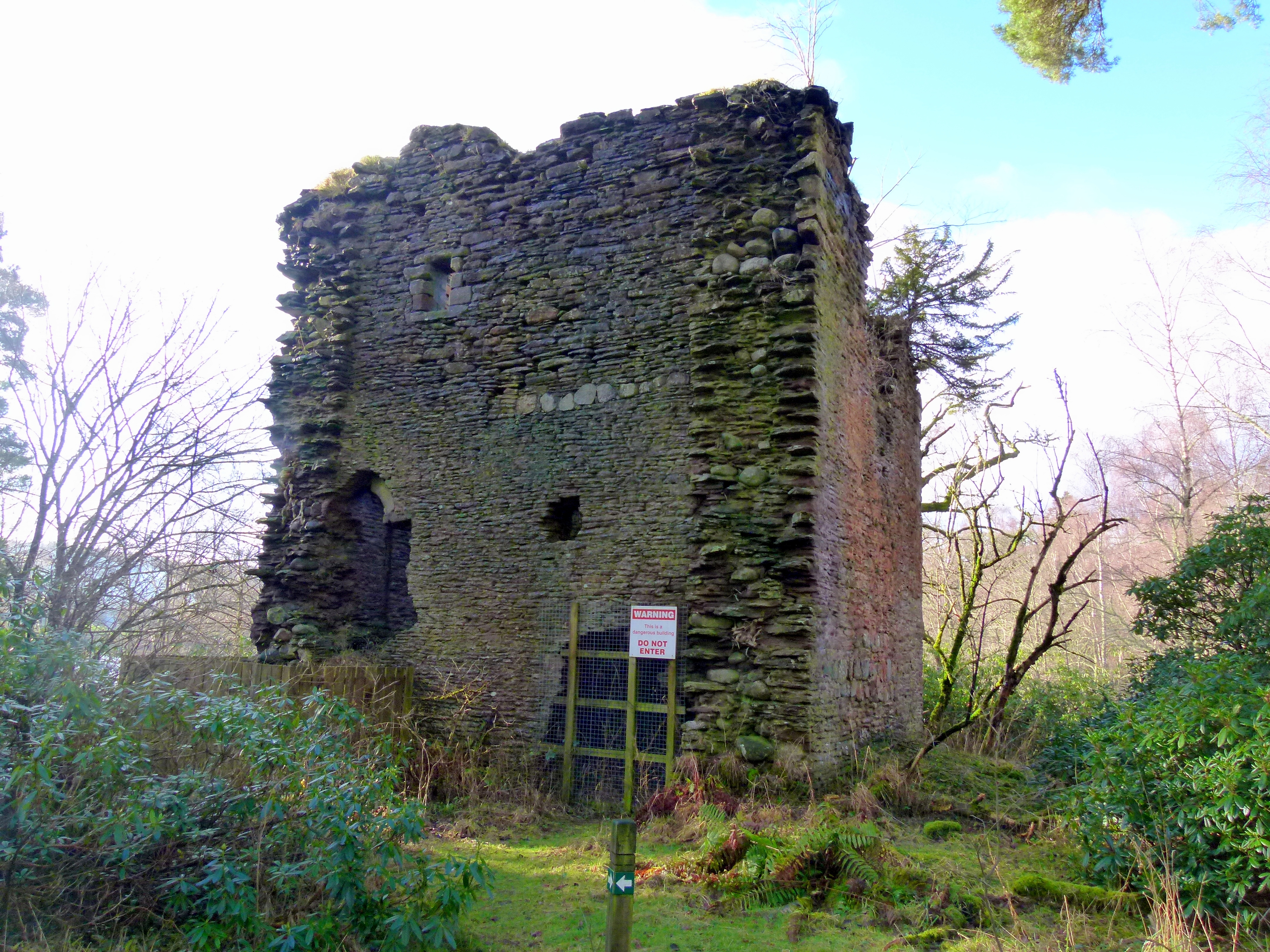
- Ruined tower of Castle Cluggy

Site information
- Condition: Ruined

Location
- Location in Perth and Kinross, Scotland
- Coordinates: 56.3886°N 3.8807°W

Site history
- Built: c. 15th century
- Materials

Castle Cluggy is a ruined 15th century castle located on the north side of Loch Monzievaird, Perth and Kinross, Scotland. The castle replaced an earlier structure. The Comyn family held the lands in the 14th century. The Drummond family held the lands in the 15th century and later passed to the Murray family in the 16th century. The castle was in ruins by the middle of the 18th century, after the Murrays commenced construction of Ochtertyre House to the north.
