= Gaberlunzie =

Gaberlunzie /ɡæbərˈlʌnji/ is a medieval Scots word for a licensed beggar.

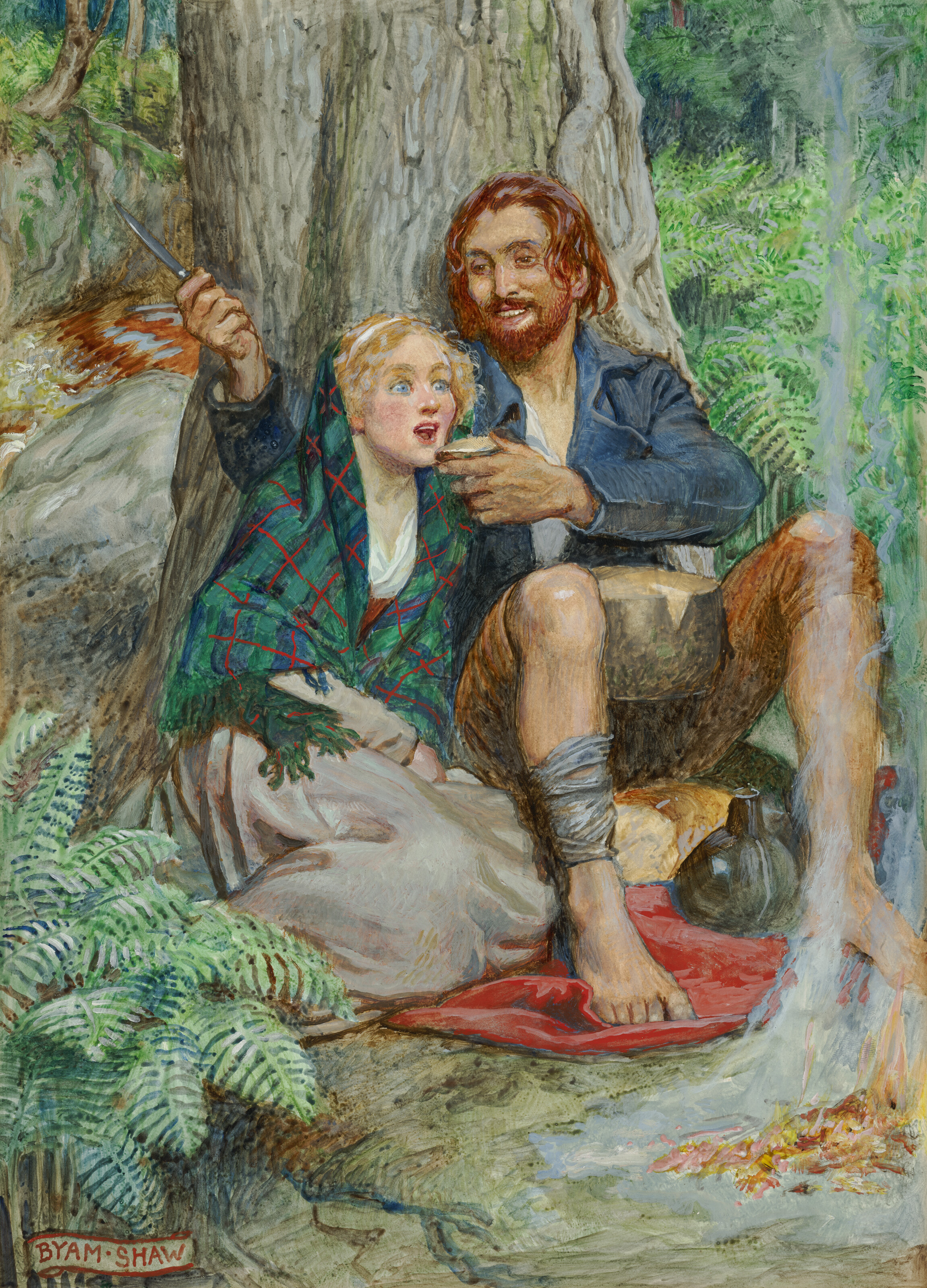
"The Gaberlunzie Man" (Byam Shaw, c. 1908)

== Etymology ==
The name may derive from the wallet that such people carried, or from a combination of the French words 'gaban' (a cloak with tight sleeves and a hood) and 'laine' (wool), as these beggars often wore coarse woollen gowns. The beggars were sometimes also called 'bluegowns' from the colour of their cloaks. Chambers's Encyclopaedia of 1892 offers a derivation from the Spanish word 'gaban' (the same origin as the word gabardine), with the second part from 'loin' "the part on which the wallet rests."

The word can also be spelled gaberlunyie, since the z was originally a yogh (gaberlunȝie).

== Literary use ==
The word appears in several of Sir Walter Scott's books. Gaberlunzies were also known as King's Bedesmen or blue gouns (the gowns were part of the alms given by the monarch). Scott gives an account of the customs and of particular Bedesmen he knew in the introduction to The Antiquary (1816).

Scotsman Donald Farfrae uses the word in Thomas Hardy's The Mayor of Casterbridge (1886): "There are not perpetual snow and wolves at all in it!—except snow in winter, and—well—a little in summer just sometimes, and a 'gaberlunzie' or two stalking about here and there, if ye may call them dangerous."

Gaberlunzie is the name of a character in Alan Garner's novel The Weirdstone of Brisingamen (1960).

The word also makes an appearance in novels in Patrick O'Brian's Aubrey–Maturin series - Treason's Harbour (1983) and The Hundred Days (1998).

The word is also referenced in the Outlander television series: in Episode 8 of Season 1, a character by the name of Hugh Munro wears many tokens on his chest, granting him permission to beg in different Scottish parishes.

The Scottish folk duo of the same name were formed in the late 1960s and completed their last tour in 2018.

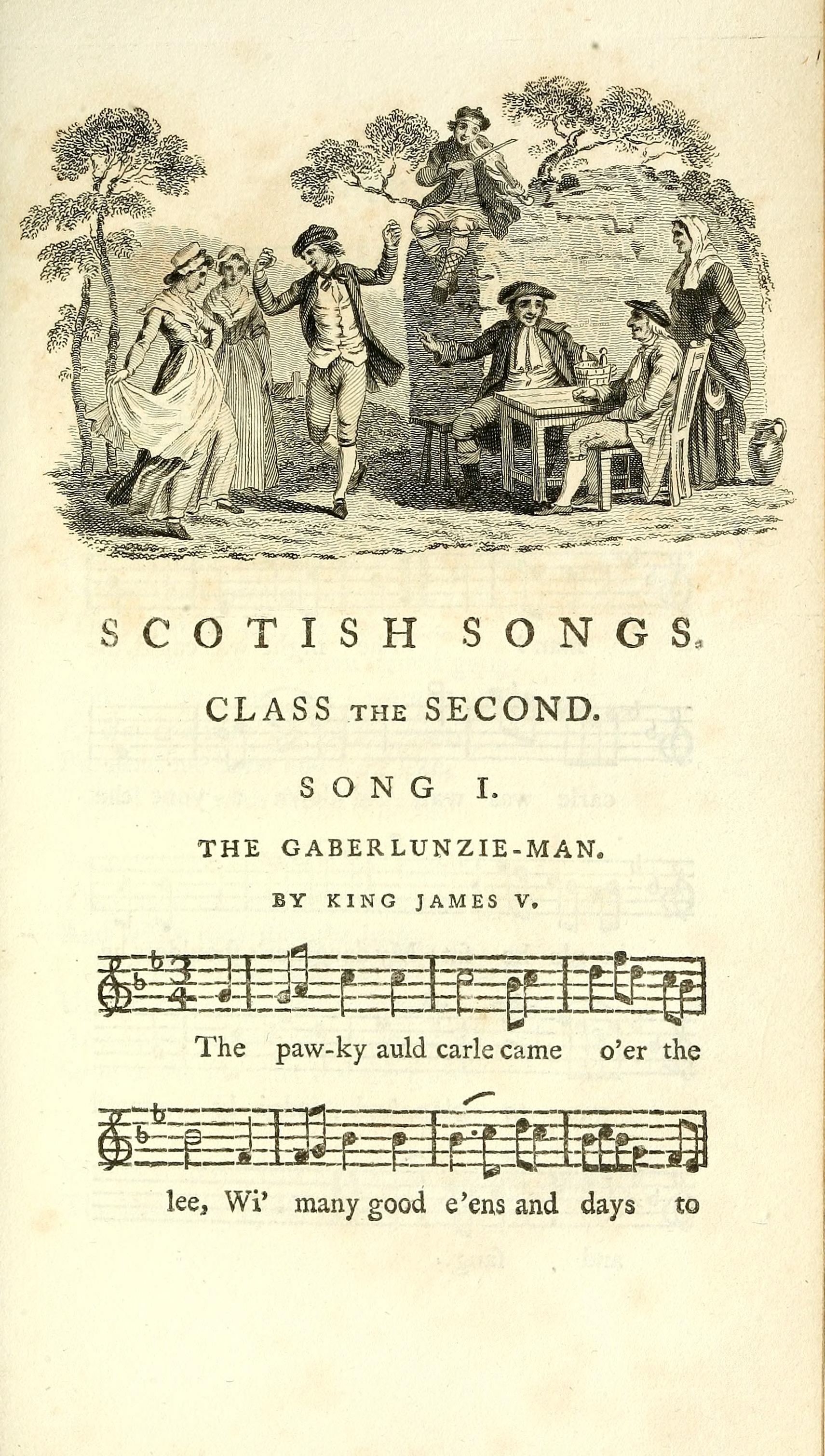
Folk ballad "The Gaberlunzie-Man", attributed to James V

James V admired the life so much he would adopt the cloak and purse and travel his kingdom incognito, reciting ballads for supper and board.

== See also ==
- "The Jolly Beggar", Child Ballad 279, also known as "The Gaberlunzieman".
