= Patrick Murray of Ochtertyre =

Scottish advocate, landowner and politician

Arms of Murray of Stanhope: Azure, three mullets argent; in the centre a cross of the second, surmounted by a saltire gules

Sir Patrick Murray of Ochtertyre, 6th Baronet FRSE (3 February 1771 – 1 June 1837) was a Scottish advocate, landowner and politician, serving as MP for Edinburgh from 1806 to 1812 and Baron of the Exchequer in 1820. He is sometimes referred to as Sir Peter Murray.

== Life ==
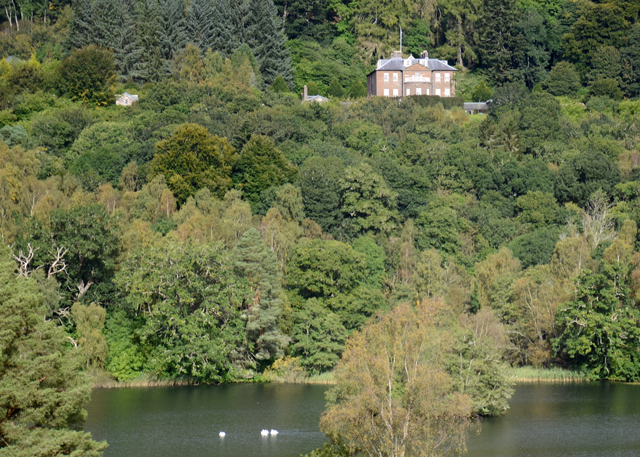
Ochtertyre House, Scotland.

He was born at Ochtertyre House on 3 February 1771 the eldest son of Lady Augusta Mackenzie, daughter of George Mackenzie, 3rd Earl of Cromartie, and her husband William Murray of Ochtertyre. He was educated at the High School in Edinburgh then studied law at the University of Glasgow and the University of Edinburgh. He became an advocate in 1793.

In 1796 he was elected a Fellow of the Royal Society of Edinburgh. His proposers were Rev James Finlayson, James Gregory, and John Playfair. In 1799 he was appointed King's remembrancer in the exchequer for life. In 1800, on the death of his father, he became 6th Baronet of Ochtertyre.

He became Member of Parliament for Edinburgh in 1806 on the recommendation of Lord Melville but resigned in 1812 before the end of the parliament. His most important role was that of Secretary to the Board of Control from 1810 to 1812, which involved serving as the chief official in London responsible for Indian affairs. He was a Baron of the Scottish Exchequer from 1820 to his death.

He died on 1 June 1837.

== Military service ==
A keen soldier, Murray was Captain of the Edinburgh Volunteers from 1797 to 1803, also being Captain of the Perthshire Brigade in 1800. In 1803 he became Lt-Colonel Commander of the Strathearn Volunteers and in 1808 Lt-Colonel of the Perthshire Militia.

== Family ==
In December 1794 he married Lady Mary Ann Hope (died 1838), daughter of John Hope, 2nd Earl of Hopetoun by his third wife. They had eight children including William Keith Murray and Henry Dundas Murray. His son, Patrick Murray (1812-1889), was an advocate. His brother was Lt-General Sir George Murray.

== Artistic recognition ==
His engraved portrait by Thomas Goff Lupton is held by the Scottish National Portrait Gallery. It is based on an original oil portrait by Sir John Watson Gordon.

Baronetage of Nova Scotia
Preceded by William Murray	Baronet (of Ochertyre); 1800–1837	Succeeded by William Keith Murray
