= Ochtertyre =

Country house in Perth and Kinross, Scotland

Coordinates: 56.391°N 03.883°W

Ochtertyre: Scottish Gaelic: Uachdar Thìre
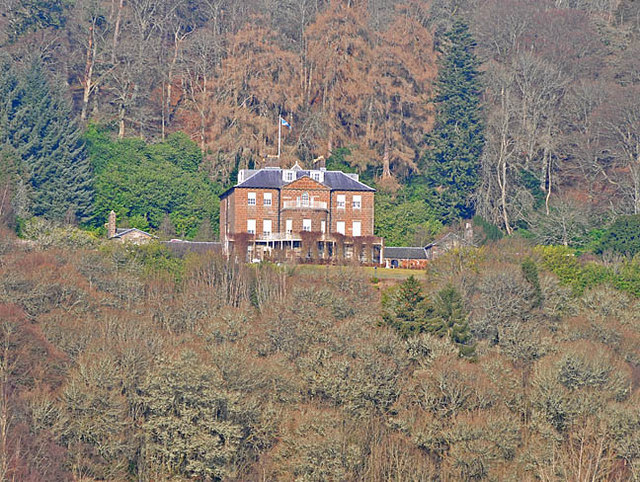
- Ochtertyre House

- Location within Perth and Kinross
- OS grid reference: NN8323
- Council area: Perth and Kinross
- Country: Scotland
- Sovereign state: United Kingdom
- Police: Scotland
- Fire: Scottish
- Ambulance: Scottish

Designations

Inventory of Gardens and Designed Landscapes in Scotland
- Official name: Ochtertyre
- Designated: 1 July 1987
- Reference no.: GDL00304

Ochtertyre /ˌɒxtərˈtaɪər/ is a country house and estate in Perth and Kinross, Scotland. It is located in Strathearn, between Crieff and Loch Turret, north of the A85.

== History ==
The ancient seat of the Ochtertyre estate was Castle Cluggy, on the shore of Loch Monzievaird. The Ochtertyre estate was granted in the 15th century by David Moray of Tullibardine to one of his younger sons.

The Ochtertyre estate was the subject of a violent blood feud between the Murrays and the Drummonds in the neighbourhood in the late 15th century. The Murrays of Ochtertyre had been engaged by their relative, the abbot of nearby Inchaffray Abbey, with collecting teinds from the Drummonds of Monzievaird. They did this with such brutality that the Drummonds were provoked into retaliation. They went to Ochtertyre and tried to evict the Murrays from their land. The conflict led to the Battle of Knock Mary, which the Murrays lost, and the subsequent Massacre of Monzievaird. The episode was captured by the historical novelist Walter Scott in his book A Legend of Montrose.

The Murrays of Ochtertyre were granted a baronetcy in 1673. Sir Patrick Murray, 2nd Baronet, extended the estate with the purchase of the adjacent Barony of Monzievaird. Robert Burns visited Sir William Murray at Ochtertyre on his tour to the Highlands with Willie Nicol in 1787. Around this time, an older house was replaced with the current Georgian building, which was constructed from 1784 to 1790. The design of the house has been attributed to James McLeran, a Scottish architect "responsible for some plain late Georgian country houses".

Sir Patrick Murray of Ochtertyre, the 6th Baronet, served as MP for Edinburgh from 1806 to 1812. Sir Patrick laid out the designed landscape and gardens around the house, which were also added to by his son, Sir William Keith Murray, the 7th Baronet. A family mausoleum was added in 1809, remote from the main house, designed by Charles Heathcote Tatham. From 1939 the house served as a school for girls, until 1965 when the estate was broken up and sold. It is now privately owned. The house is a category A listed building and the grounds are included on the Inventory of Gardens and Designed Landscapes.
