= Battle of Knock Mary =

Battle fought in 1511 (or 1490) between the Murray, Drummond, and Campbell clans

Coordinates: 56°23′22″N 3°51′45″W

- Part of the Scottish clan wars
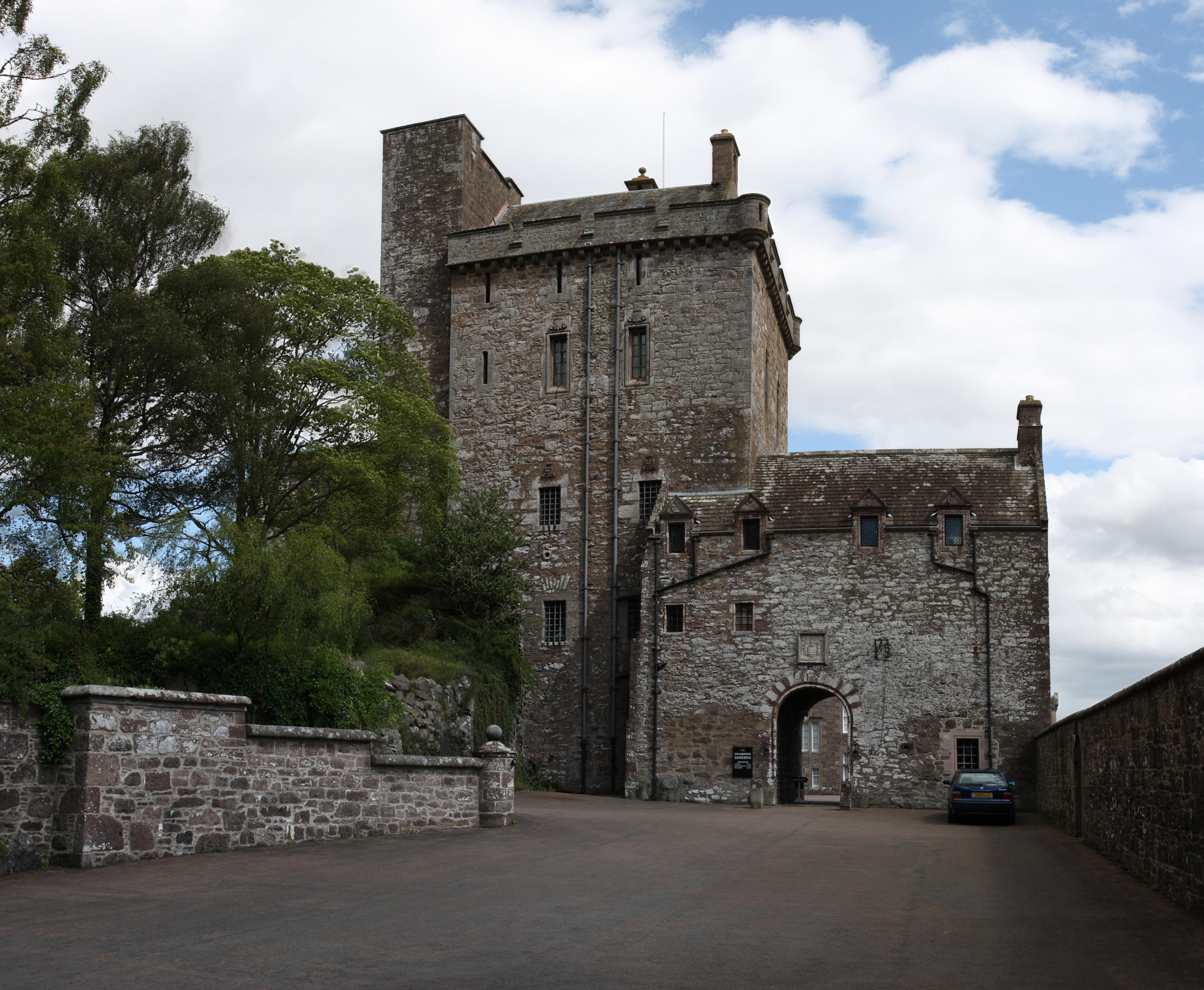
- Drummond Castle, near to the site of where the battle began
Date	1511
Location	Knockmary near Crieff, Scotland grid reference NN8503523453
Result	Drummond/Campbell victory

Belligerents
Clan Murray	Clan Drummond; Clan Campbell

Commanders and leaders
Murray of Auchtertyre	William Drummond

Strength
Unknown	Unknown

Casualties and losses
120–160 in church	Unknown

The Battle of Knockmary (or Battle of Rottenreoch) was a Scottish clan battle fought in 1511, or 1490 between the Clan Murray against the Clan Drummond and Clan Campbell, north of Crieff, Scotland.

== Background ==
In 1511 (some sources say 1490), the Murrays of Ochtertyre took cattle from Drummond of Strathearn, the purpose of this was to pay a debt demanded by the Abbot of Inchaffray. In revenge for this William Drummond, the son of the 1st Lord Drummond attacked the Murrays.

== The battle ==
The clans met initially at Knock Mary, a hill on the south bank of the River Earn between the river and Drummond Castle. At first the Murrays were winning, but the battle was turned by the arrival of Campbells from Dunstaffnage under Duncan Campbell, McRobbies from Balloch and Faichneys from Argyllshire. Campbell had come to Strathearn to avenge the Murrays' recent murder of his two brothers-in-law and father-in-law, Drummond of Menie. Traditionally the dead from this battle were believed to be buried in the cairn of Rottenreoch, just north of Knock Mary (grid reference NN84252063, but this appears to be a Neolithic long cairn.

Having fled the battlefield, the Murrays crossed the River Earn and took refuge in the Kirk of Monzievaird, about a mile north of the river. Drummond was happy to let them go, but as Campbell returned home, an arrow fired from the church killed one of his men. In revenge the church was burned to the ground, killing those inside. Reports on casualties vary between 120 and 160 Murrays. This became known as the Massacre of Monzievaird.

== Aftermath ==
William Drummond was arrested and despite his protests that the Drummonds had nothing to do with the fire, he was executed at Stirling along with many of his friends.

== Gallery ==
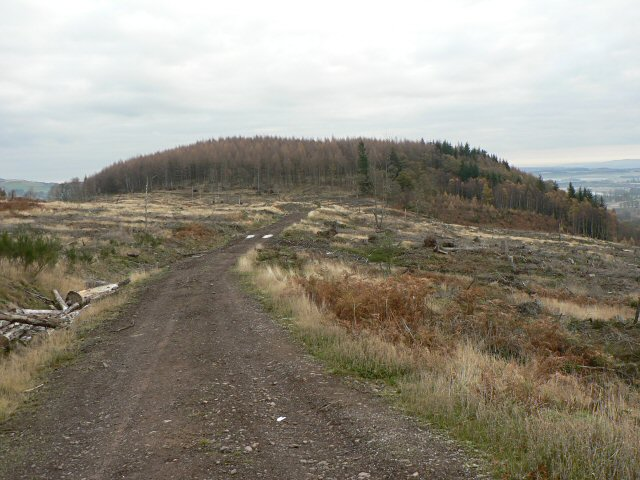
Looking towards the site, of the battle on the hill of Knock Mary

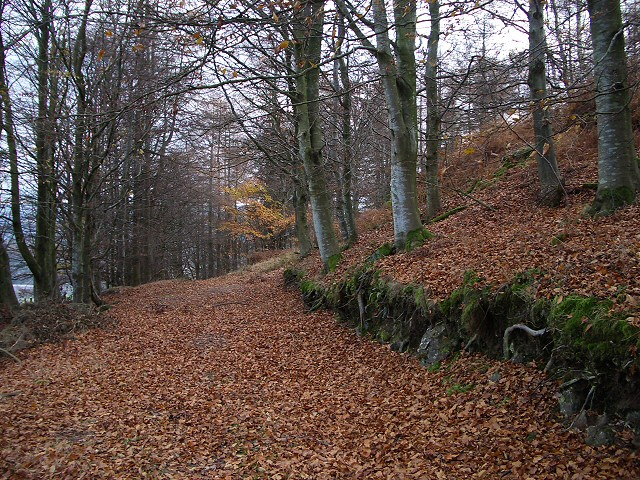
A path inside Knock Mary

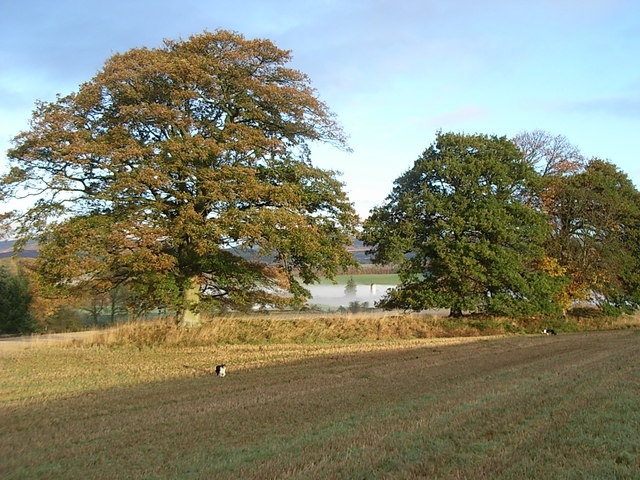
The once rumoured burial place of the battle, the cairn of Rottenreoch

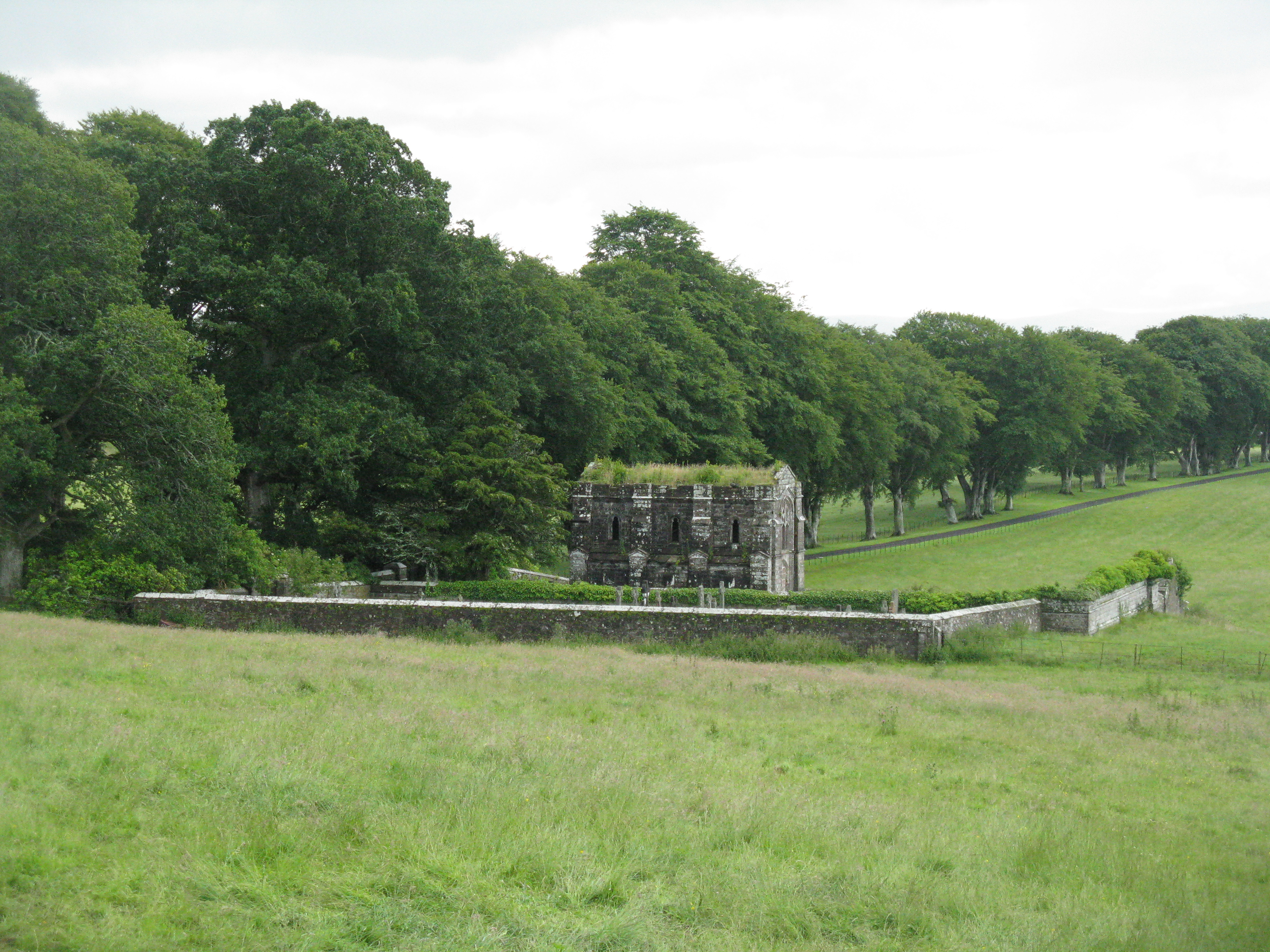
The site of the ensuing massacre at the Church of Monzievaird, near Hosh
