= William Keith Murray =

Scottish peer, landowner and soldier

Arms of Murray of Stanhope: Azure, three mullets argent; in the centre a cross of the second, surmounted by a saltire gules

Lt Colonel William Keith-Murray 7th Baronet of Ochtertyre FRSE FRSSA (19 July 1801 – 16 October 1861) was a Scottish peer, landowner and soldier.

== Life ==
He was born William Murray at Ochtertyre on 19 July 1801 the son of Patrick Murray of Ochtertyre and Lady Mary Anne Hope, daughter of John Hope, 2nd Earl of Hopetoun by his third wife.

In 1834 he was elected a Fellow of the Royal Society of Edinburgh. His proposer was James Skene. He resigned from the Society in 1839. In 1843 he was elected a Fellow of the Royal Scottish Society of the Arts.

In 1837 on the death of his father he succeeded to the baronetcy.

He died on 16 October 1861.

== Family ==
In 1833 at St Cuthbert's Church, Edinburgh he married Helen Margaret Oliphant Keith daughter of Sir Alexander Keith of Dunnottar. Following marriage he adopted the name Keith-Murray.

Helen died in 1853 and he then married Lady Adelaide Augusta Lavinia Hastings, daughter of the Marquess of Hastings.

He had ten sons and three daughters, seven of whom survived, including Patrick Keith Murray who succeeded to the baronetcy on his death. Patrick had already inherited the estates of Dunnottar in Kincardineshire and Ravelston in Edinburgh on the death of his mother.

Baronetage of Nova Scotia
Preceded by Patrick Murray	Baronet (of Ochertyre); 1837–1861	Succeeded by Patrick Keith-Murray
