= Massacre of Monzievaird =

1490 clan massacre in Monzievaird, Perthshire, Scotland

Coordinates: 56°23′22″N 3°51′45″W

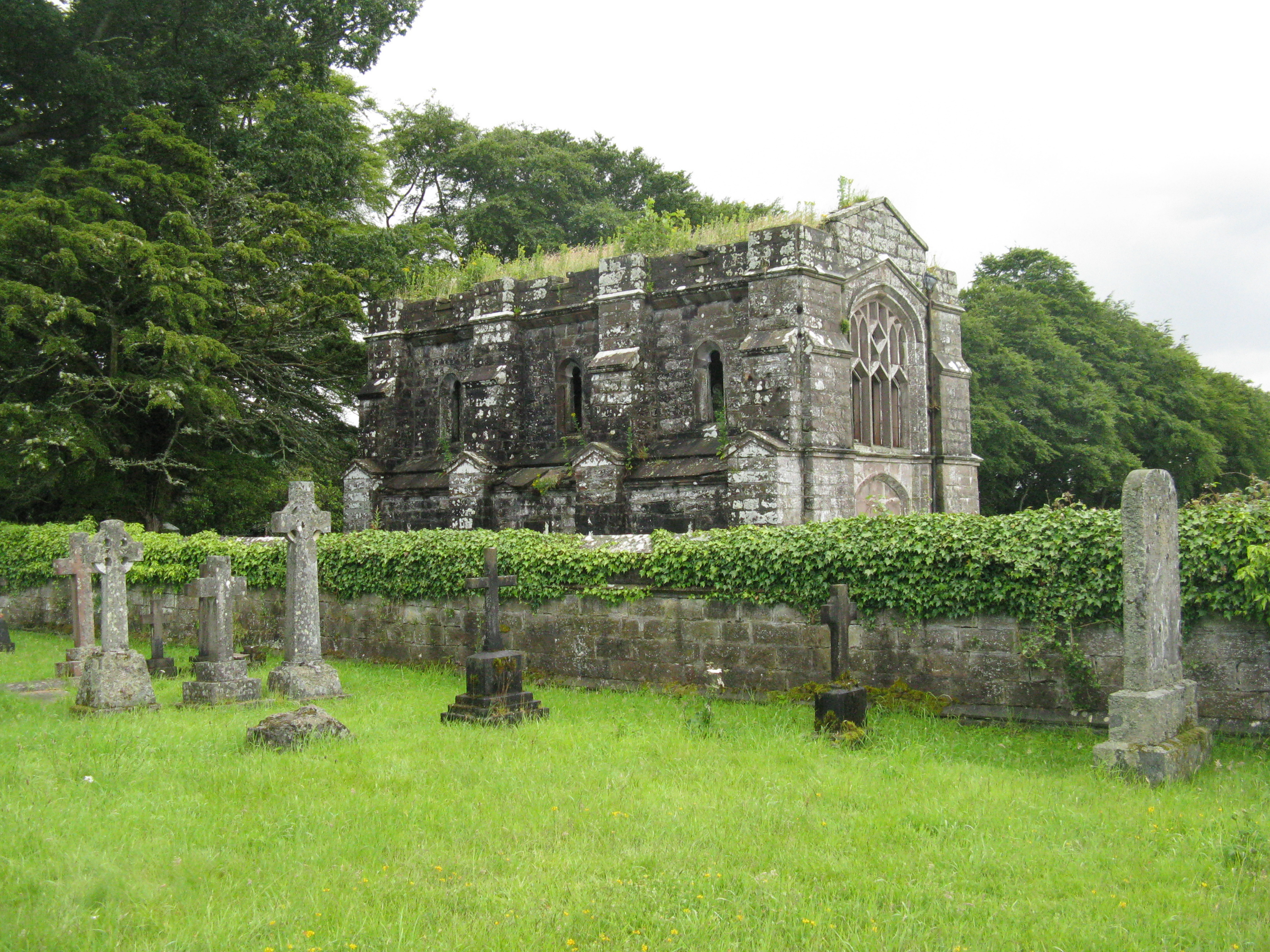
Mausoleum at Ochtertyre, built on the site of the old church

The Scottish Highland Massacre of Monzievaird took place on 21 October 1490, at the church of Monzievaird, at Ochtertyre, near Hosh in Perthshire. Some sources give the date as 1511. It was the culmination of a violent blood feud between the Murray and Drummond families. Although feuding, murdering kin, and marrying enemies was commonplace for Highlanders at the time, the massacre was nevertheless notorious and sensational in its day.

== Background ==
William Murray of Tullibardine lost the stewardship of Strathearn, which he had held for over fifty years, to Lord Drummond. Despite their marital links, the Drummonds evicted the Murrays and set about creating difficulties for George Murray, the abbot of Inchaffray Abbey. When the abbey subsequently ran short of funds Murray sought to assess the teinds of the Drummond lands of Monzievaird. The abbot charged the Murrays of Ochtertyre with the task, which they eagerly undertook with such brutality that the Drummonds were provoked into violent retaliation.

== Massacre ==
Lord Drummond's second son, David, accompanied by a body of retainers, set out to forcibly evict the Murrays from Ochtertyre, but the Murrays were warned of Drummond's attack and were well prepared. The turning point in the ensuing battle came when a party of McRobbies from Balloch and Faichneys from Argyllshire joined forces with the Drummonds against the Murrays. The Murrays were forced to the north and made a final stand at Hill at Knock Mary on the other side of Rottenreoch, from Monzievard kirk. Many Murrays were killed and the remainder fled back towards Ochtertyre.

As the Drummonds made their way back in triumph to Drummond Castle they came upon Duncan Campbell of Dunstaffnage with a party of his clan members. He also had a score to settle with the Murrays, as his father-in-law and two of his sons had been murdered by them some time before. Campbell persuaded the Drummonds to resume their pursuit of the Murrays, and the combined Drummonds and Campbells marched towards Ochtertyre.

About 20 Murray men fled and took refuge in the nearby church at Monzievaird, close by Hosh. One shot an arrow from the window of the church, killing one of the Drummonds searching for them outside but revealing their hiding place. The Drummonds retaliated by gathering all the brushwood they could find and stacking it against the church, which was roofed with thatch and heather, and lighting it. Only one of the Murray men survived the fire; the rest were killed either inside the church or trying to escape the building, reportedly to the accompaniment of a piper.

The one surviving Murray escaped death by jumping from a window. Thomas Drummond recognized him as his cousin and taking pity on him spirited him away. This act of compassion did not endear Thomas to the rest of his clan; he was forced to leave Crieff and lived in exile in Ireland for many years. Thomas eventually returned to Scotland after the Murrays had regained their power and showed their gratitude by giving him a small estate in Perthshire. This estate originally known as Drummond-Ernoch or Drummond of Ireland, now called Drummonderinoch, lies about a mile southeast of Comrie. The Faichneys, from Argyll, subsequently obtained land holdings around Strageath, Muthill and Innerpeffray.

Over the years oral history has placed the number of dead Murrays as high as 120 men along with wives and children, but others claim that this number is inflated.

== Outcome ==
Blood feuds were threatening to create a breakdown of political and social life in parts of Scotland at the time and the authorities felt that an example had to be made. James IV of Scotland ordered the arrest of David Drummond and the other main antagonist, Duncan Campbell of Dunstaffnage. Both men were executed by hanging at Stirling.

== 1809 ==
The old Monzievaird parish church was demolished, and nothing remains. The Ochtertyre family built their Mausoleum on the site in 1809. Arthur Gordon wrote in 1896 that when the mausoleum's foundations "were being dug a quantity of charred wood was found, and very many calcined bones—those nearer the door on the west being of larger size than the others towards the east, which were probably those of women and children. They must have been buried as they lay."

== Site of the Church in modern times ==
Located near Hosh, by the side of the drive to Ochtertyre house from the A85, the house is about 1.1 km to the west. As of 2015 despite the roof being still intact, it is on the Buildings at Risk Register for Scotland.

== Gallery ==
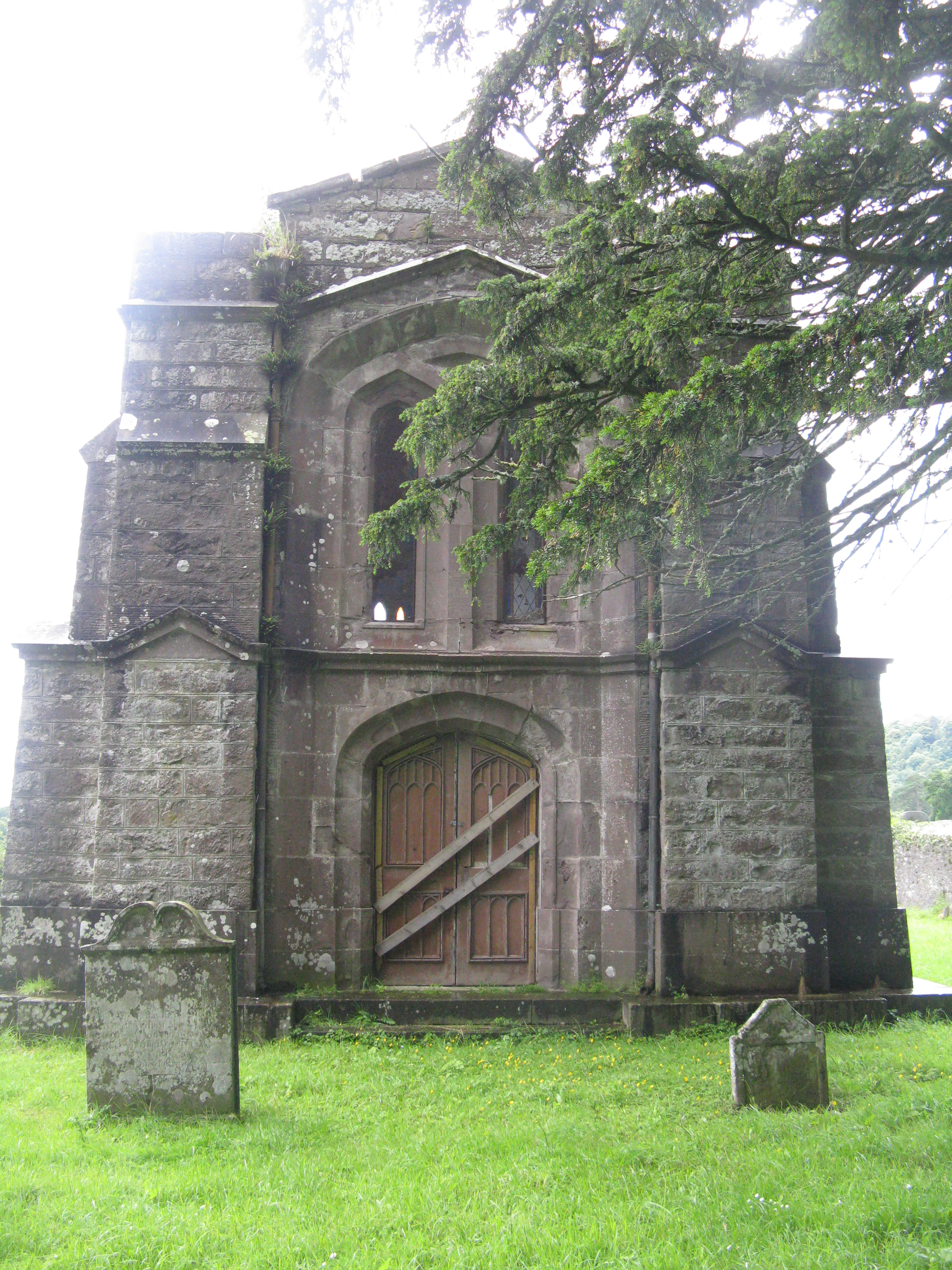
Scene of the Massacre in 2015

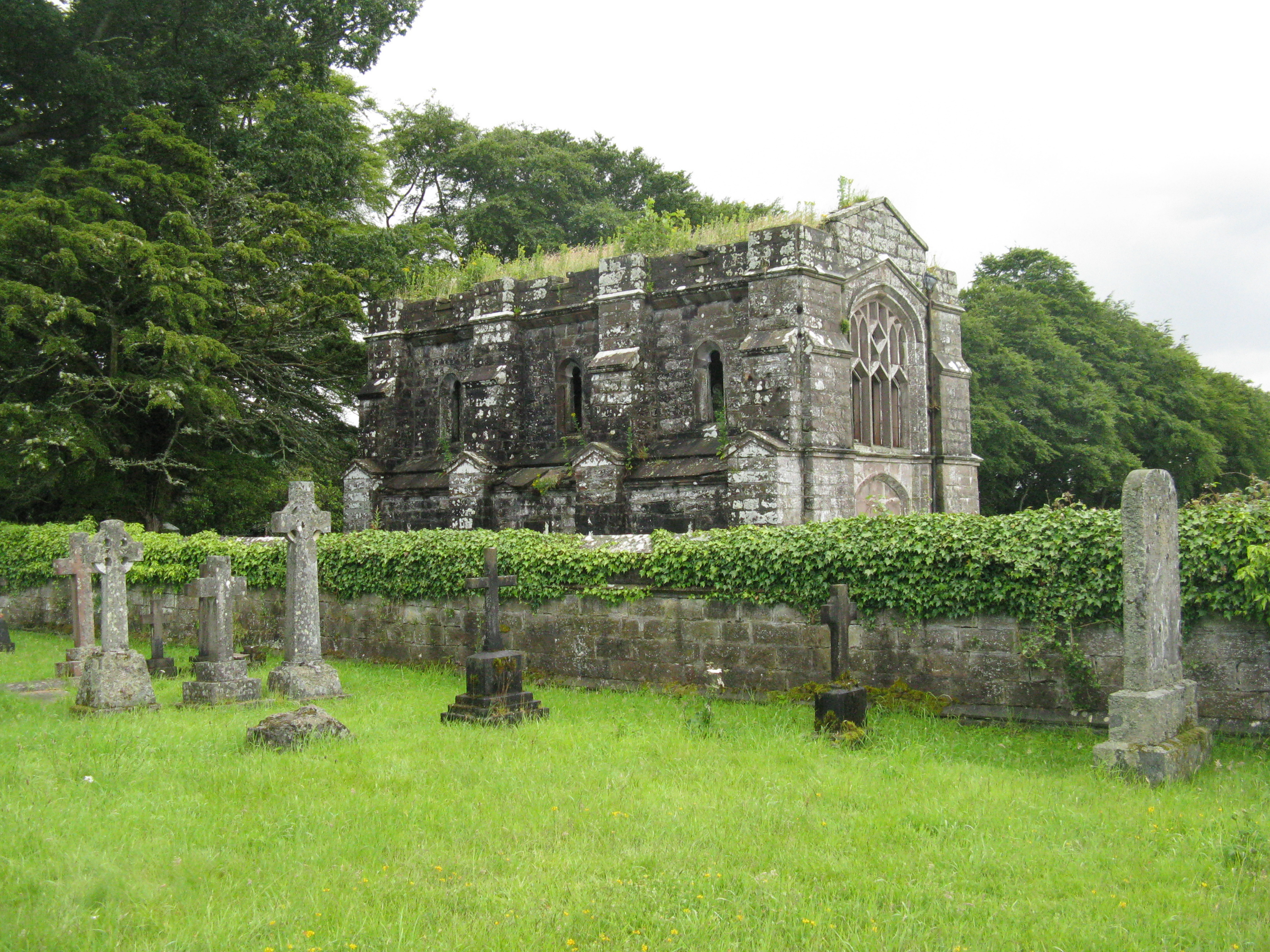
Mausoleum at Ochtertyre in 2015

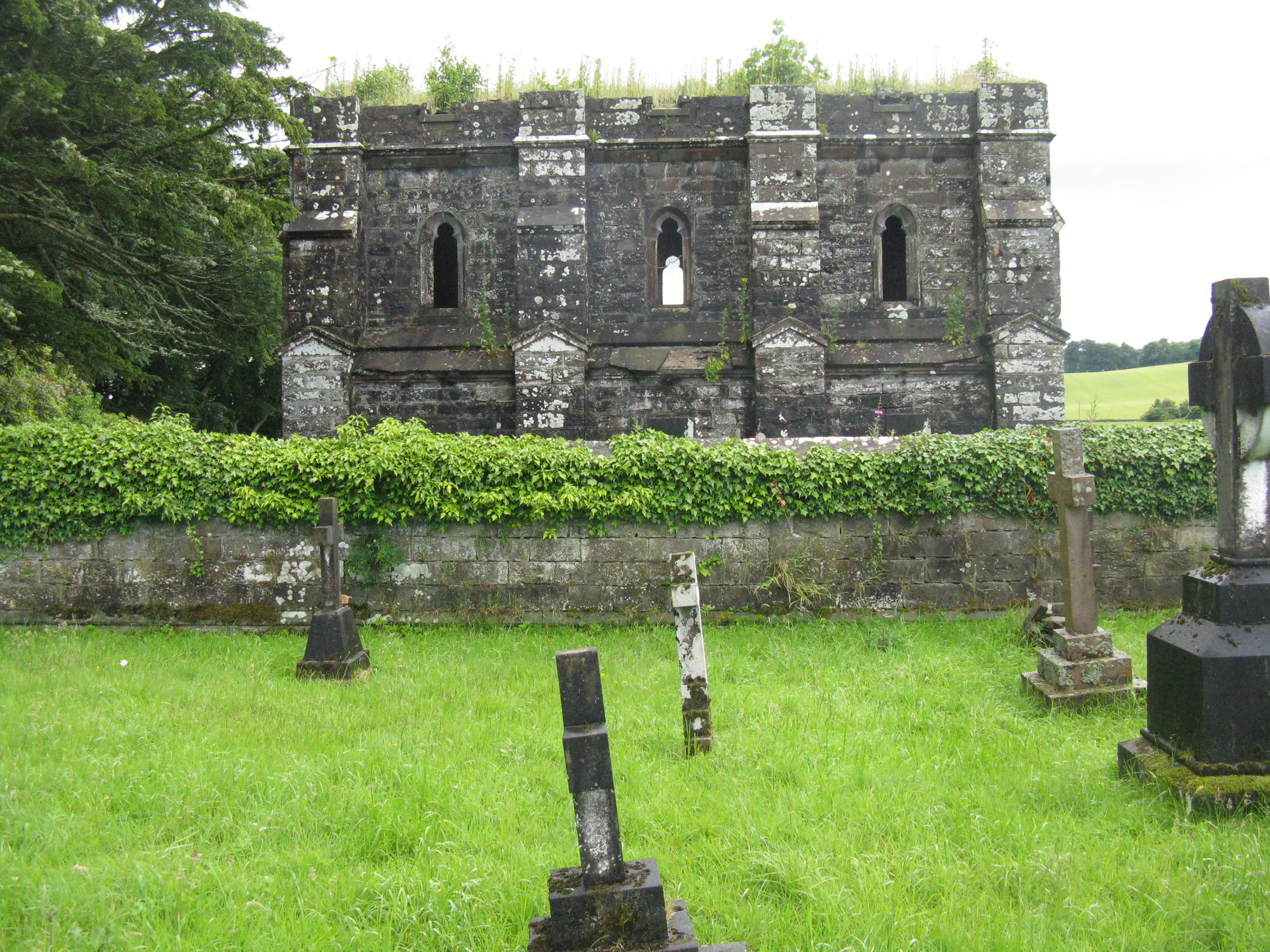
Mausoleum and Graveyard in 2015

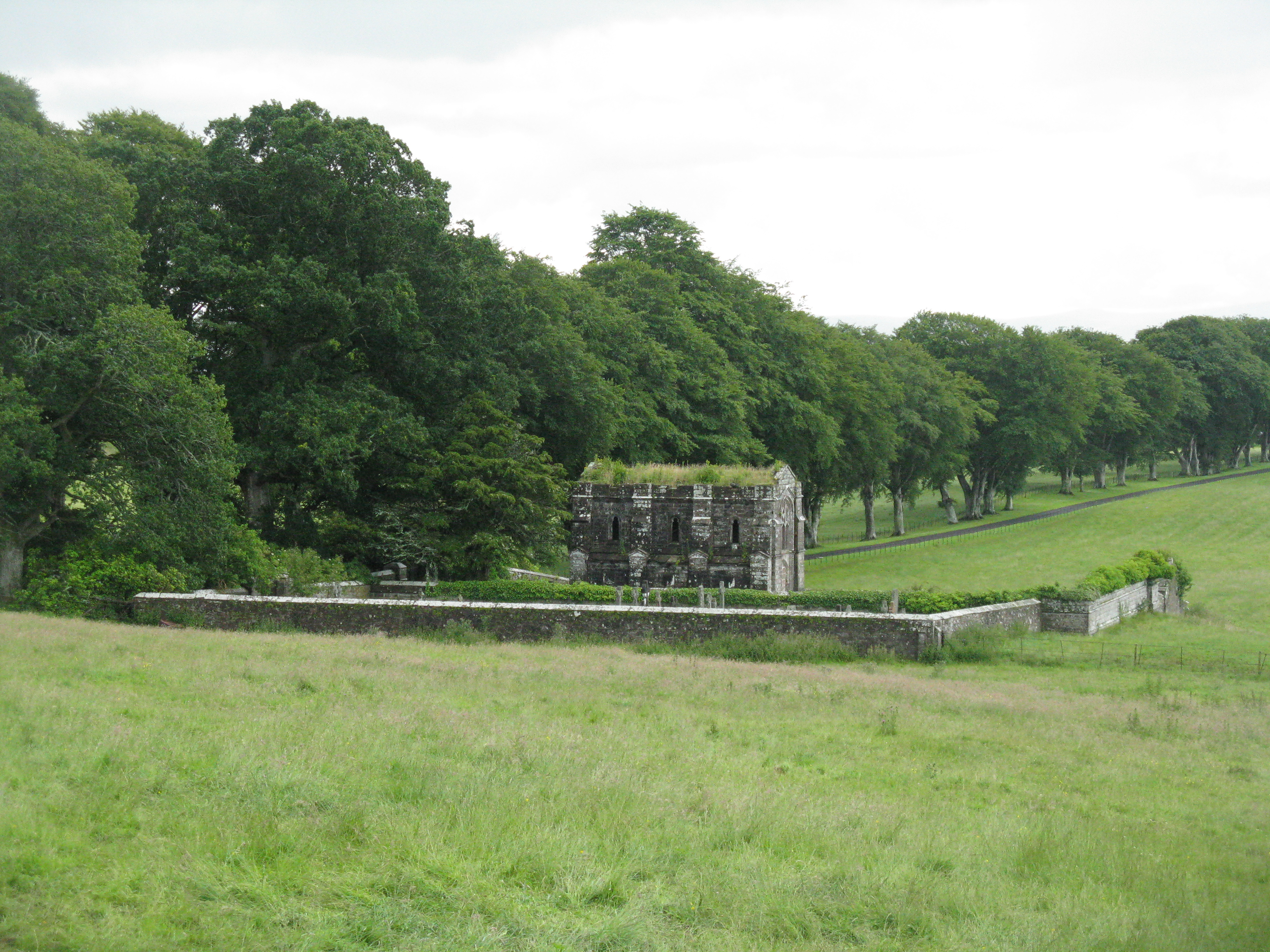
Murray Mausoleum and burial ground from a distance in 2015

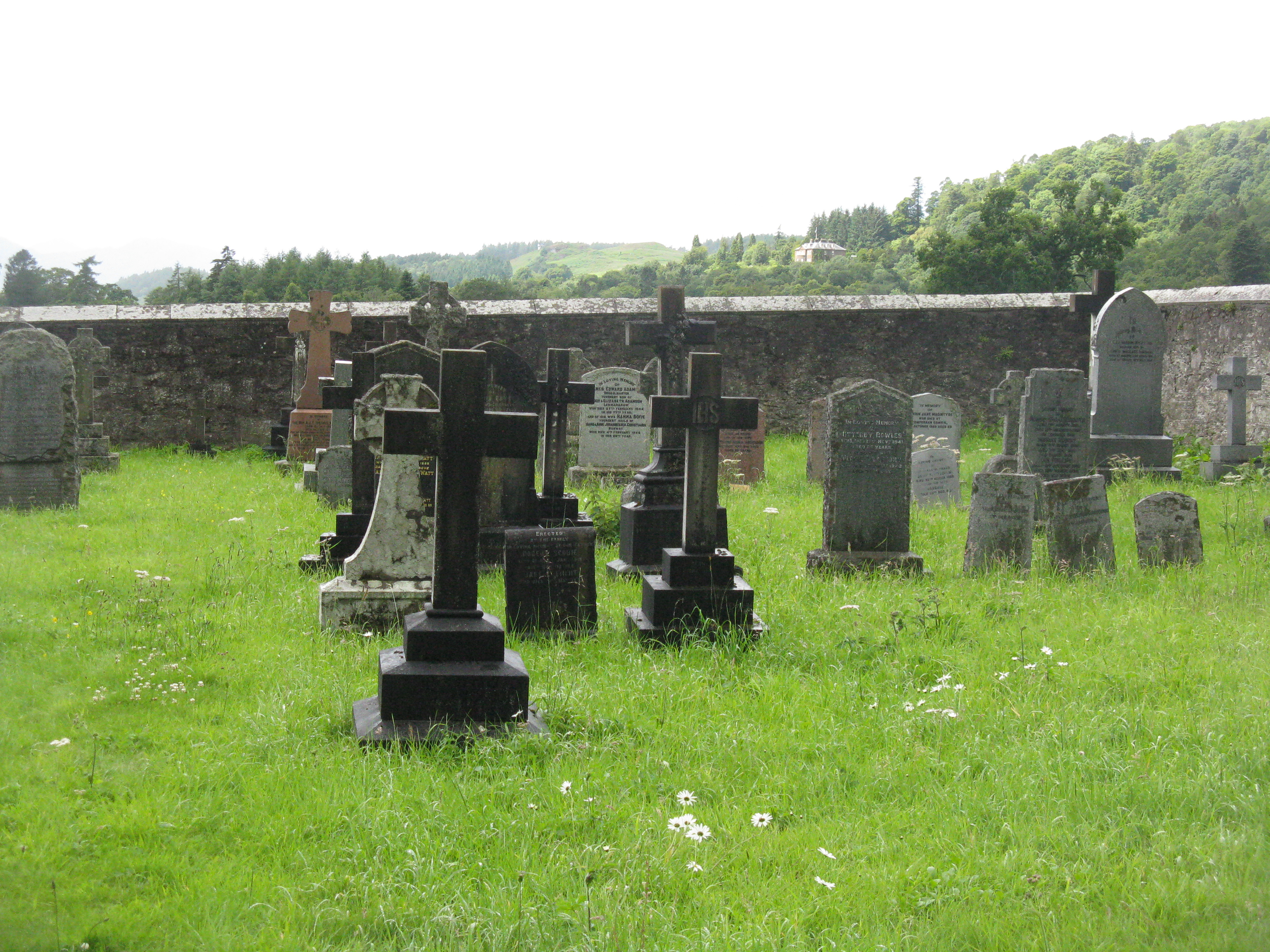
Ochtertyre House seen from the burial ground in 2015

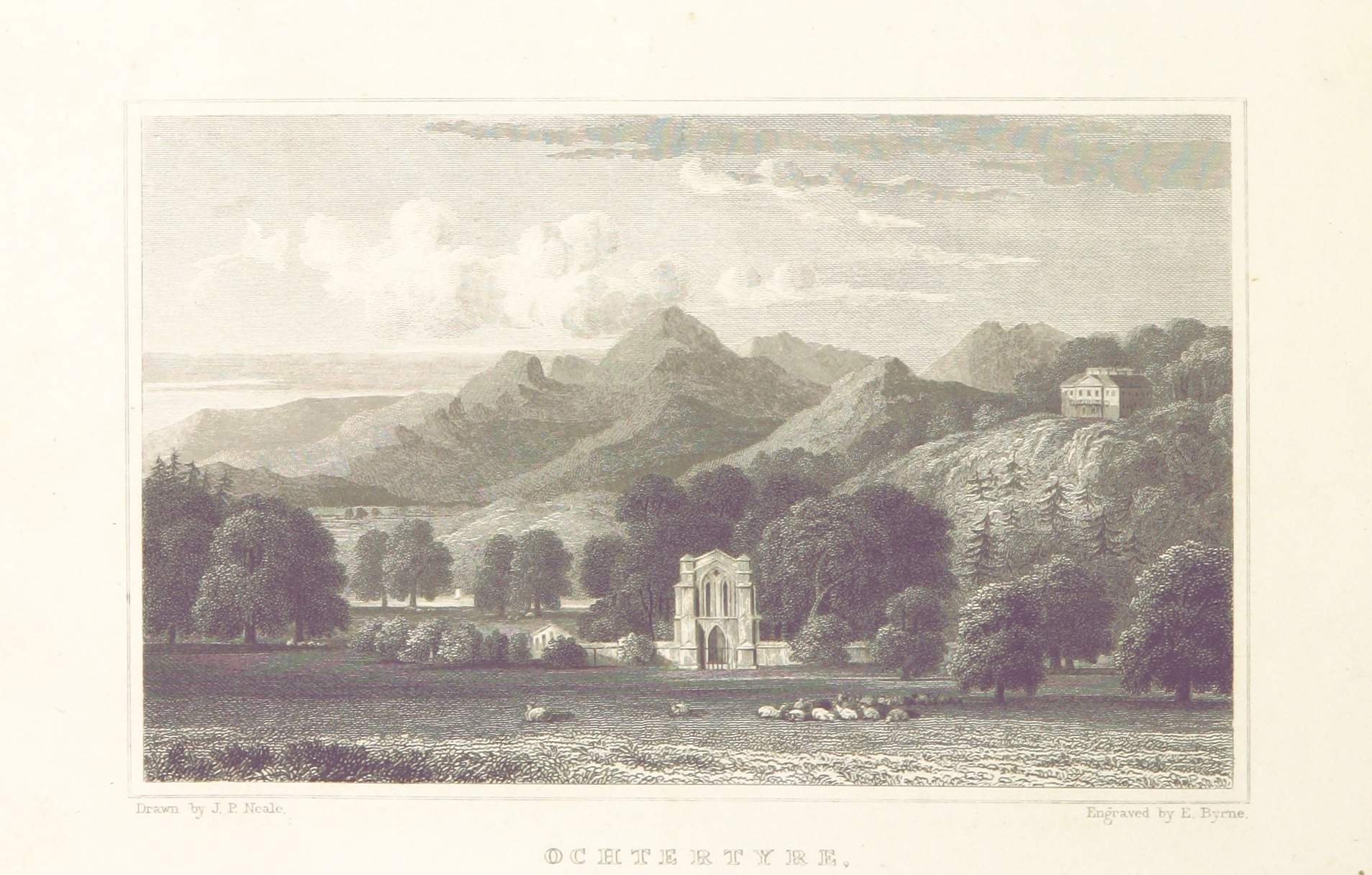
The area in 1829 below Ochtertyre house drawn by John Preston Neale, engraved by E. Byrne

== See also ==
- Scottish clan
- List of massacres in Great Britain
