= Monzievaird =

Coordinates: 56.388333°N 3.88°W

Monzievaird: Scottish Gaelic: Magh Bhàird
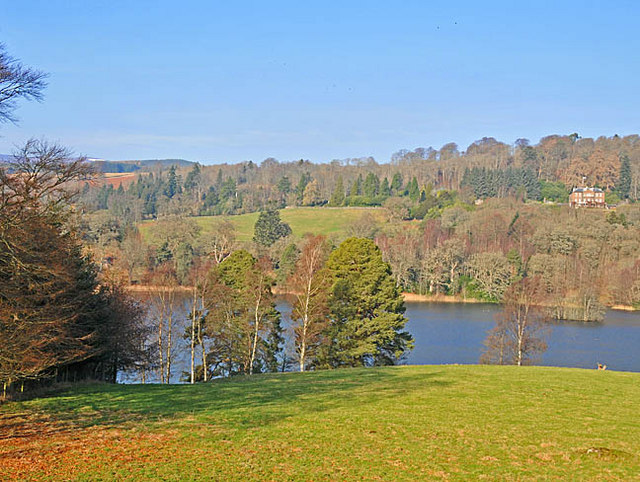
- Loch Monzievaird

- Location within Perth and Kinross
- OS grid reference: NN833234
- Council area: Perth and Kinross
- Lieutenancy area: Perth and Kinross
- Country: Scotland
- Sovereign state: United Kingdom
- Police: Scotland
- Fire: Scottish
- Ambulance: Scottish

Monzievaird (/ˈmɒnivɛərd/) is a location in Scotland, situated 2 miles (3 km) west of Crieff, within the Highland district of Perth and Kinross. The village of Monzie (pronounced "Mon-ee") lies a few miles to the east-northeast.

== Name ==
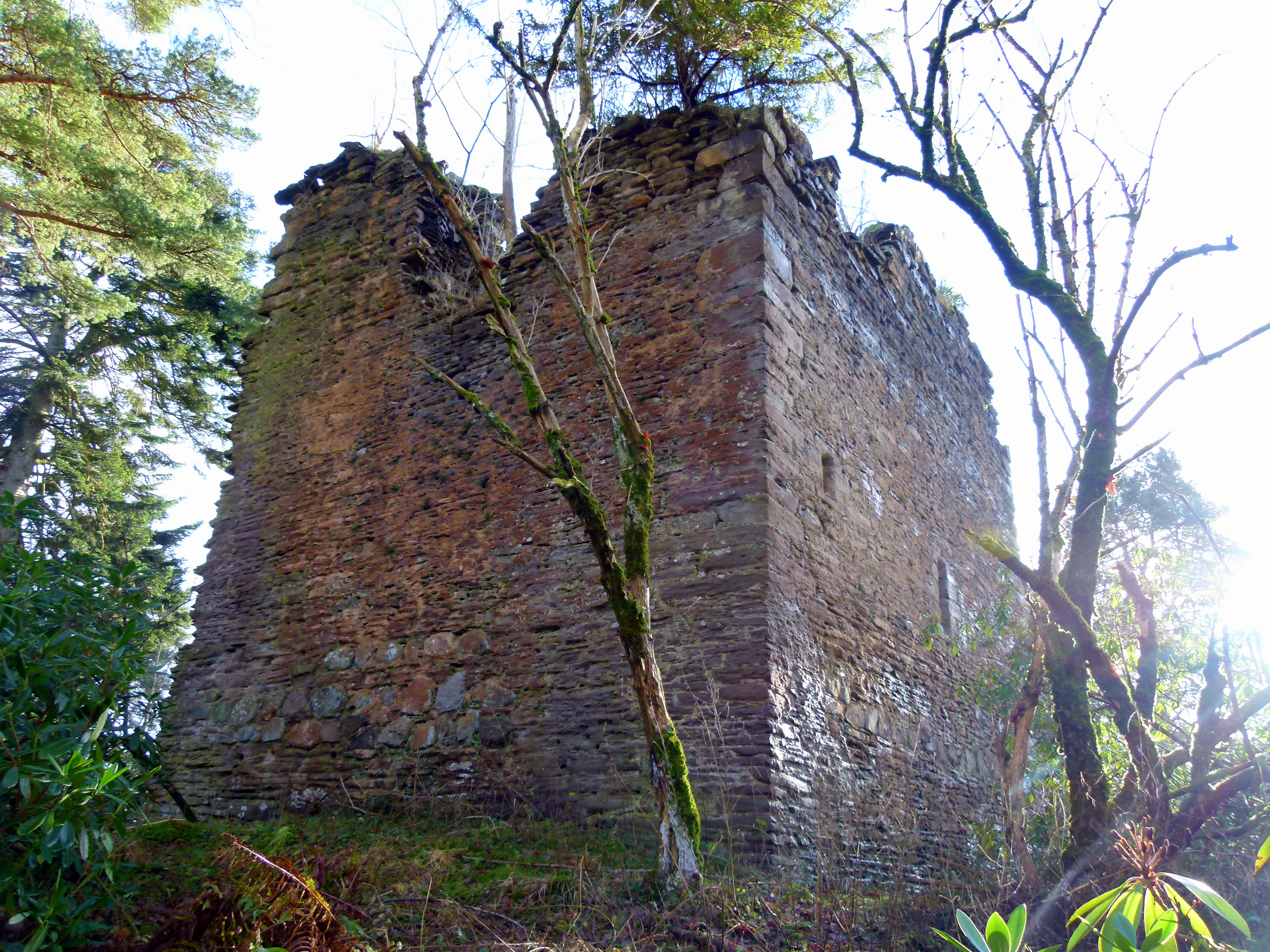
Castle Cluggy on the Dry Isle within the Loch

The place was originally named Muithauard around 1200 and Moneward in 1203. Two different etymologies are proposed for the name.

The first suggests that the name is derived from the Gaelic magh + bard, meaning "plain of the bards". Locals pronounce it as "Mon-ee-vaird". According to this interpretation, the name of the nearby village of Monzie is unrelated, except for influencing the pronunciation of the first syllable "Monz" as "Mon" in linguistic sympathy.

The second etymology proposes that Monzievaird derives from magh ("plain") and edha (the genitive case of edh or iodh, meaning "corn"), combined with the Saxon vaird or ward, meaning "enclosure". This would render the meaning as "place where corn is stored". Under this interpretation, the village name of Monzie shares the same origin, as does the name of the nearby Monzie Castle.

Regardless of its origin, the name Monzievaird was also given to the nearby Loch Monzievaird.

== Administration ==
Traditionally, Monzievaird was part of the Stewardship of Strathearn and had its own parish church. From the 13th century, it was under the control of the Murrays of Tullibardine.

Following the Act of Union, Monzievaird became part of the county of Perthshire. In 1890, it was incorporated into the civil parish of Monzievaird and Strowan. In 1930, the civil parish system was replaced, and Monzievaird was placed in the Highland District of Perthshire. From 1975 to 1996, it was part of the Perthshire and Kinross District within the Tayside region. In 1996, it came under the newly established county of Perth and Kinross.

== Architecture ==
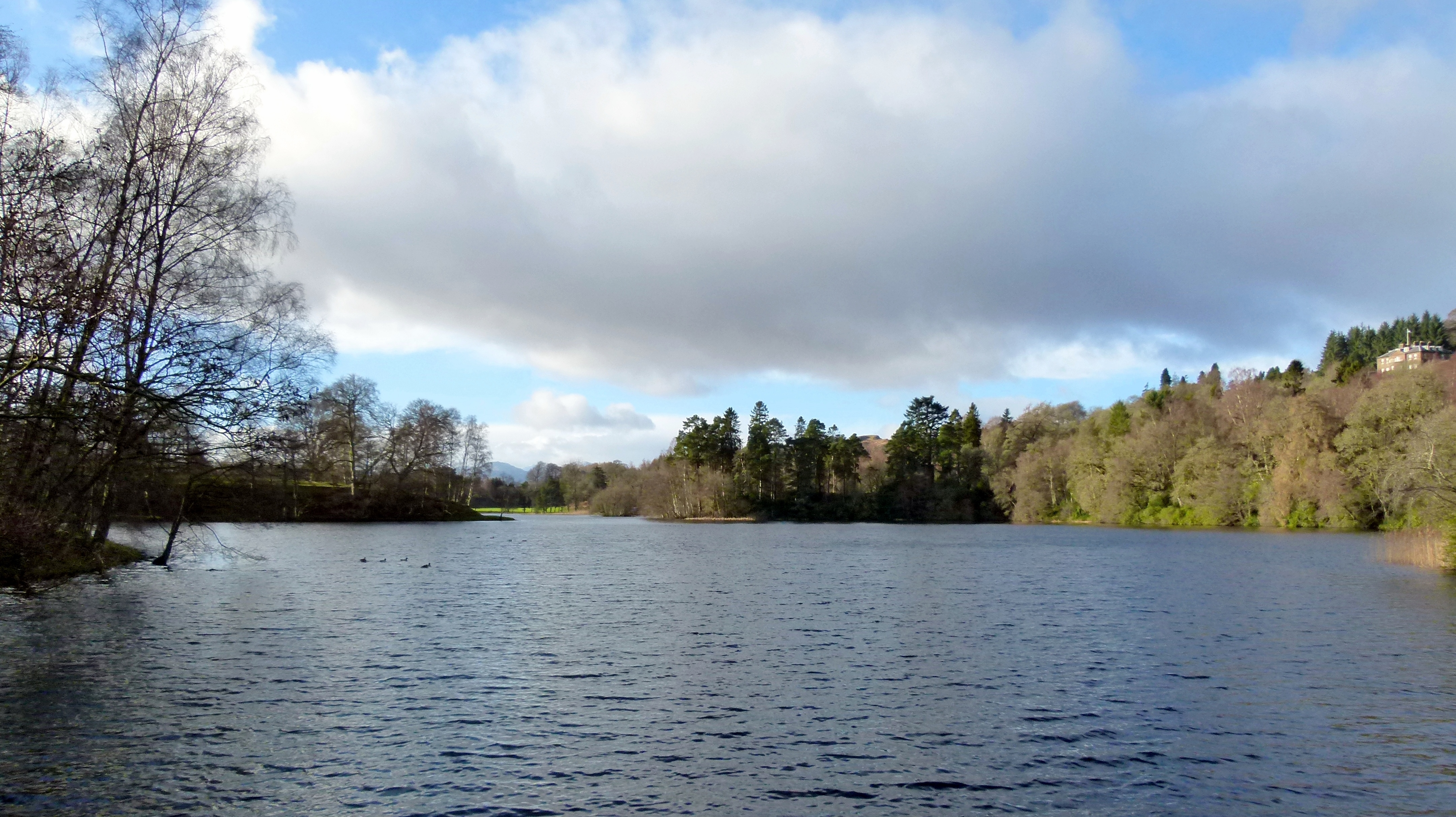
Loch Monzievaird overlooked by Ochtertyre House

Ochtertyre House, the Murray family seat in Perthshire from 1784 to 1790, is located here, overlooking the loch from an elevated position. Its grounds feature a designed landscape. The house is a Georgian Category A listed building.

Now a private residence, it has served various purposes over the years, including as a school (Seymour Lodge, 1939–1965), a theatre, and a restaurant. The Murray family mausoleum, built in 1809, now stands on the site of the former parish church.

== Economy ==
The local Glenturret Distillery is renowned for producing a popular single malt whisky.

== History ==
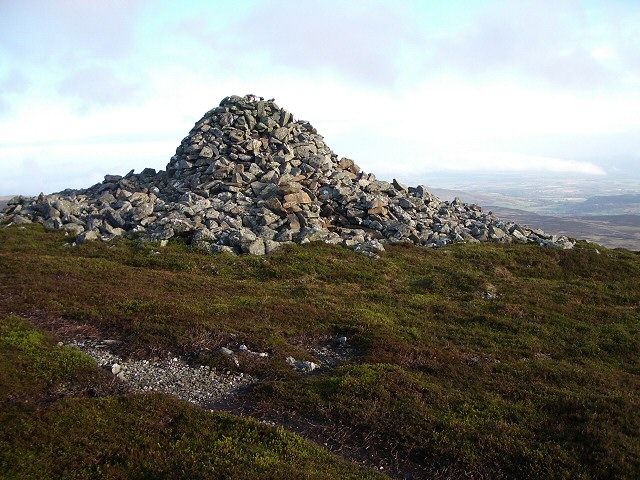
Carn Chainichin. King Kenneth's Cairn

=== Battle of Monzievaird ===
On 25 March 1005, Malcolm II of Scotland fought and killed Kenneth III of Scotland and his son, Giric II of Scotland, a Mormaer. The battle took place on the north side of the loch.

King Kenneth's Cairn was erected in memory of the son of King Duff, who was killed in the Battle of Monzievaird that year and later buried on Iona. The cairn stands in a prominent position on the edge of the steep escarpment at Corrie Barvick.

=== The Massacre of Monzievaird ===
Immediately following the Battle of Knock Mary on 21 October 1490, the Drummonds and Campbells set fire to the old church of Monzievaird, killing approximately twenty members of the Murray family. Upon hearing of the massacre, James IV of Scotland, ordered the arrest of the main perpetrators, David Drummond and Duncan Campbell of Dunstaffnage. They were executed in Stirling shortly thereafter. The nation was horrified by the incident, which was widely regarded at the time as sacrilegious.

=== New York state ===
The town of Cornwall, in the state of New York, originated from a colony of twenty-five Scottish families who settled around the mouth of the Moodna Creek in 1685. The settlement was led by Major Patrick McGregor, a soldier, and his brother-in-law, David Toiseach, the laird of Monzievaird.
