= McFadzean =

McFadzean is a surname. Notable people with the surname include:

- Cameron McFadzean (born 1971), Australian sprint canoeist
- David McFadzean, American television producer, writer and playwright
- Francis McFadzean, Baron McFadzean of Kelvinside (1915–1992), British businessman
- Jim McFadzean (1938–2016), Scottish footballer
- Kyle McFadzean (born 1987), English footballer
- William McFadzean (1895–1916), Irish World War I Victoria Cross recipient
- William McFadzean, Baron McFadzean (1903–1996), British politician
