= Loch Monzievaird =

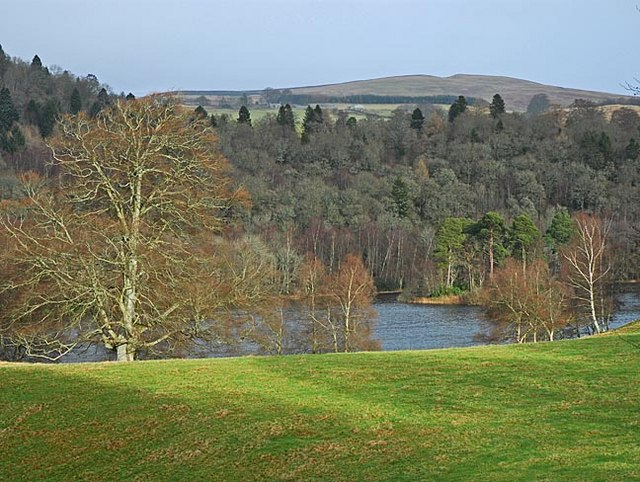
- The eastern end of Loch Monzievaird, the small island may be a crannog.

- Location within Scotland
- Location: Perthshire, Scotland
- Coordinates: 56°23′15″N 3°52′48″W
- Type: loch

Loch Monzievaird (Scottish Gaelic: Loch Moighidh a' Bhàird) is a loch in Scotland, located in the region of Perthshire.

== History ==
King Kenneth III of Scotland was killed at the battle of Monzievaird in 1005.

On the north side of the loch are the remains of an old fortress called Castle Cluggy. This was the original home of the lairds of Ochtertyre. The fortress was referred to as 'ancient' in a charter of 1467. It belonged to Red Comyn, who was killed in 1306 by Robert the Bruce in the convent of the Minorites (Greyfriars Kirk) at Dumfries. It is thought that Sir William Murray, 1st Baronet of Ochtertyre, last inhabited the castle in the middle of the 17th century.

About 80 yards to the west of the ruin is a small artificial island that served as a prison. At the west end of the loch is a large mound where plague victims were buried in the reign of Charles I.

== Location ==
Loch Monzievaird is situated two miles west of Crieff in Highland Perthshire, one of the most popular holiday destinations in Scotland. Aberfeldy, Dunkeld, Perth and Pitlochry are all within easy reach by car. St Andrews, Dundee, Glasgow and Edinburgh are only about an hour's drive away.
