= List of Latin-script letters =

This is a list of letters of the Latin script. The definition of a Latin-script letter for this list is a character encoded in the Unicode Standard that has a script property of 'Latin' and the general category of 'Letter'. An overview of the distribution of Latin-script letters in Unicode is given in Latin script in Unicode.

== Basic Latin ==
ISO basic Latin alphabet
Aa	Bb	Cc	Dd	Ee	Ff	Gg	Hh	Ii	Jj	Kk	Ll	Mm	Nn	Oo	Pp	Qq	Rr	Ss	Tt	Uu	Vv	Ww	Xx	Yy	Zz

== More letters ==
Letter	Name	Writing system	IPA value(s)	Notes
ᴀ	Small caps A	Nonstandard IPA	/ä/	Used in Sinological phonetic notation
ᴀ	Small caps A	FUT	/ɑ̥/	
Ɐ ɐ ᵄ	Turned A ( Upside down a )	IPA	/ɐ/	IPA near-open central vowel
𝽚	Half A	Initial Teaching Alphabet		
Ɑ ɑ ᵅ	Alpha (script A)	IPA, Cameroon Languages, Duka	/ɑ/	IPA open back unrounded vowel, cf. Greek: Α α
ꬰ	Barred alpha (Barred script A)	Otto Bremer's transcription	/a/	
ꭤ	Inverted alpha (Inverted script A)	APA	/ä/	
Ɒ ɒ ᶛ	Turned alpha (turned script A)	IPA, APA	/ɒ/	IPA open back rounded vowel
Ɒ ɒ ᶛ	Turned alpha (turned script A)	SDA	/ä̹/	IPA open back rounded vowel
Ɒ ɒ ᶛ	Turned alpha (turned script A)	Dania	/ɐ̹/	IPA open back rounded vowel
𝽨 𝽩	Phonotypic a with swash	English Phonotypic Alphabet		
𝽪 𝽫	Phonotypic roundtop a	English Phonotypic Alphabet		
𝾀	A with topbar	English Phonotypic Alphabet		
ʙ 𐞄	Small caps B	IPA	/ʙ/	IPA voiced bilabial trill; Superscript form is an IPA superscript letter
ʙ 𐞄	Small caps B	Finno-Ugric transcription (FUT)	/b̥/	
ᴃ ᴯ	Small capital barred B	Finno-Ugric transcription (FUT)	/β̞/	
Ꞗ ꞗ	B with flourish	Middle Vietnamese	/β/	
Ꞵ ꞵ	Latin Beta	Nonstandard IPA, Gabon languages, Ndaʼndaʼ	/β/	Gabon Languages Scientific Alphabet; cf. Greek Β β
ᴄ	Small capital C	FUT	/t̬͡s/	
Ↄ ↄ	Reversed C	Claudian letters	/(b~p)s/	
Ꭓ ꭓ	Chi	Nonstandard IPA	/χ/	
Ꭓ ꭓ	Chi	APA	/χ/	In practice, orthographies like those of Comox or Halkomelem (hən̓q̓əmin̓əm̓) based on APA use the Greek character χ. More common variants of APA use x̌ or x̣ instead.
Ꭓ ꭓ	Chi	Lepsius Standard Alphabet	/x/	
Ꭓ ꭓ	Chi	Teuthonista	/ç/ or /ʝ/	
ꭕ	Chi with low left serif / bar	Teuthonista	/xʲ/	
ꭔ	Chi with low right ring	Teuthonista		
Ð ð ᶞ	Eth / Ett	IPA	/ð/	IPA voiced dental fricative, see also Elfdalian, African languages
Ð ð ᶞ	Eth / Ett	Icelandic, Old English	/ð~θ/	IPA voiced dental fricative, see also Elfdalian, African languages
Ð ð ᶞ	Eth / Ett	Faroese	/∅/	IPA voiced dental fricative, see also Elfdalian, African languages
𝼯	Eth with palatal hook	Obsolete IPA		
Ꟈ ꟈ	D with short stroke overlay; tau gallicum	Gaulish	/t͡s/ and /st-/	
𝼭	D with hook and palatal hook	Obsolete IPA		
Ꝺ ꝺ	Insular D	(Archaic) Cornish, Welsh	/ð/	
Ꝺ ꝺ	Insular D	Insular script	/d/	
ᴅ	Small capital D	FUT	/d̥/	
ᴆ	Small capital eth	FUT	/ɾ̥/	
ꝱ	Dum	Latin, Medieval abbreviation	/dum/, /ˈdɪ.ɛː/	
ẟ	Delta	Middle Welsh (scholarly transcriptions)	/ð/	cf. Greek Δ δ
ᴇ	Small capital E	FUT	/e̞̥/	
ꬲ	Blackletter E	Teuthonista		
ꬳ	Barred E	Teuthonista		
ꬴ	E with flourish	Teuthonista		
Ǝ ᴲ ǝ	Turned E	Pan-Nigerian alphabet	/ə/	
Ǝ ᴲ ǝ	Turned E	Anii alphabet	/ə~ɨ/	
Ǝ ᴲ ǝ	Turned E	Awing alphabet	/e~ə/	
Ǝ ᴲ ǝ	Turned E	Kanuri alphabet	/ə/	
Ǝ ᴲ ǝ	Turned E	Lama alphabet	/ə/	
Ǝ ᴲ ǝ	Turned E	Lukpa alphabet	/ə/	
ⱻ	Small capital turned E	Finno-Ugric transcription (FUT)	/e̥/	
Ə ə ₔ ᵊ	Schwa	IPA, Yom alphabet	/ə/	IPA mid central vowel, Bafut, Berber, Bissa, Bulu, Bura-Pabir, Daba, Dan, Dazaga, Ewondo, Fe'fe', Gude, Kamwe, Kasem, Kpelle, Kwanja, Lamnso', Lyélé, Mada, Makaa, Manengumba, Meta', Mofu-Gudur, Mundang, Mundani, Ngas, Nuni, Parkwa, Pinyin, Socoro, Tarok, Tedaga, Timne, Vengo, Vute, Yamba, Yom, Zulgo-Gemzek, Zhuang (1957-1986). cf. Cyrillic: Ә ә
Ə ə ₔ ᵊ	Schwa	Azerbaijani	/æ/	IPA mid central vowel, Bafut, Berber, Bissa, Bulu, Bura-Pabir, Daba, Dan, Dazaga, Ewondo, Fe'fe', Gude, Kamwe, Kasem, Kpelle, Kwanja, Lamnso', Lyélé, Mada, Makaa, Manengumba, Meta', Mofu-Gudur, Mundang, Mundani, Ngas, Nuni, Parkwa, Pinyin, Socoro, Tarok, Tedaga, Timne, Vengo, Vute, Yamba, Yom, Zulgo-Gemzek, Zhuang (1957-1986). cf. Cyrillic: Ә ә
Ə ə ₔ ᵊ	Schwa	General Alphabet of Cameroon Languages	/ɜ/	IPA mid central vowel, Bafut, Berber, Bissa, Bulu, Bura-Pabir, Daba, Dan, Dazaga, Ewondo, Fe'fe', Gude, Kamwe, Kasem, Kpelle, Kwanja, Lamnso', Lyélé, Mada, Makaa, Manengumba, Meta', Mofu-Gudur, Mundang, Mundani, Ngas, Nuni, Parkwa, Pinyin, Socoro, Tarok, Tedaga, Timne, Vengo, Vute, Yamba, Yom, Zulgo-Gemzek, Zhuang (1957-1986). cf. Cyrillic: Ә ә
Ə ə ₔ ᵊ	Schwa	Kemezung alphabet	/ɜ/	IPA mid central vowel, Bafut, Berber, Bissa, Bulu, Bura-Pabir, Daba, Dan, Dazaga, Ewondo, Fe'fe', Gude, Kamwe, Kasem, Kpelle, Kwanja, Lamnso', Lyélé, Mada, Makaa, Manengumba, Meta', Mofu-Gudur, Mundang, Mundani, Ngas, Nuni, Parkwa, Pinyin, Socoro, Tarok, Tedaga, Timne, Vengo, Vute, Yamba, Yom, Zulgo-Gemzek, Zhuang (1957-1986). cf. Cyrillic: Ә ә
Ə ə ₔ ᵊ	Schwa	Mfumte alphabet	[e], [ɛ]	IPA mid central vowel, Bafut, Berber, Bissa, Bulu, Bura-Pabir, Daba, Dan, Dazaga, Ewondo, Fe'fe', Gude, Kamwe, Kasem, Kpelle, Kwanja, Lamnso', Lyélé, Mada, Makaa, Manengumba, Meta', Mofu-Gudur, Mundang, Mundani, Ngas, Nuni, Parkwa, Pinyin, Socoro, Tarok, Tedaga, Timne, Vengo, Vute, Yamba, Yom, Zulgo-Gemzek, Zhuang (1957-1986). cf. Cyrillic: Ә ә
Ɛ ɛ ᵋ	Open E (Epsilon)	IPA	/ɛ/	IPA open-mid front unrounded vowel, Abidji, Adangme, Adele, Adioukrou, Agatu, Aghem, Ahanta, Aja (Benin), Akan, Akoose, Anii, Anufo, Anyin, Avatime, Ayizo Gbe, Baatonum, Bafia, Bafut, Baka (Cameroon), Baoulé, Bariba, Bambara, Bandi, Baoulé, Basa (Cameroon and Nigeria), Berber, Bhele, Bisa, Boko (Benin), Budu, Busa, Cerma, Cibak, Dagara, Dan, Dendi (Benin), Dii, Dinka, Duala, Dyula, Ewe, Ewondo, Gikyode, Igo, Ikposo, Kako, Kemezung, Kwanja, Lika, Lingala, Maasai, Mandi, Manenguba, Mangbetu, Mbelime, Medumba, Mundani, Nawdm, Ngiemboon, Ngomba, Noni, Nuer, Nyang, Pana, Pinyin language, Shilha, Tamazight, Tigon, Turka, Wuzlam, Yambasa, and Yoruba (Benin); cf. Greek: Ε ε
ɘ 𐞎	Reversed E	IPA	/ɘ/	IPA close-mid central unrounded vowel, Superscript form is an IPA superscript letter
Ɜ ɜ ᶟ	Reversed open E (Reversed Epsilon)	IPA	/ɜ/	IPA open-mid central unrounded vowel
ɞ 𐞏	Closed reversed open E (closed reversed epsilon)	IPA	/ɞ/	IPA oPA Open-mid central rounded vowel; Superscript form is an IPA superscript letter
ʚ	Closed open E (closed epsilon)	IPA (obsolete)	/ɞ/	Obsolete IPA open-mid front rounded vowel used from 1904-1920s, misprinted version of ɞ
ʚ	Closed open E (closed epsilon)	LAMSAS	/œ/	Obsolete IPA open-mid front rounded vowel used from 1904-1920s, misprinted version of ɞ
ᴈ ᵌ	Turned open E	IPA (obsolete) FUT	/ɜ/	
𝾁	E with bent topbar	English Phonotypic Alphabet		
𝽬 𝽭	Reversed scruple	English Phonotypic Alphabet		
Ꝼ ꝼ	Insular F	Old Norse	/f/	Used in Norse and Old English contexts, in particular in contrast to f in Latin words
Ꝼ ꝼ	Insular F	Old English	/f/	Used in Norse and Old English contexts, in particular in contrast to f in Latin words
ꜰ	Small capital F	IPA (obsolete)	/ɸ/	Medievalist addition
ꜰ	Small capital F	Old Norse	/ff/	
Ⅎ ⅎ	Turned F	Latin	/w/~/β/	Claudian letters
ꟻ	Epigraphic letter reversed F			
ꬵ	Lenis F	Teuthonista		
Ᵹ ᵹ	Insular G			Used in a variety of phonetic contexts
Ꟑ	Closed insular G	Ormulum	/g/	
Ɡ ɡ ᶢ	Script G	IPA	/g/	IPA voiced velar plosive
ꬶ	Script G with crossed-tail	Teuthonista		
𝼁	Reversed script g	extIPA		extIPA voiced velodorsal plosive
ɢ 𐞒	Small capital G	IPA	/ɢ/	IPA voiced uvular plosive; Superscript form is an IPA superscript letter
ɢ 𐞒	Small capital G	FUT	/ɡ̥/	
𝼰	Small capital G with palatal hook	Obsolete IPA		
ᵷ	Turned G			letter for transliterating the Georgian letter გ
𝼂	Small capital turned G	extIPA	/ɢ̠/	extIPA voiced upper-pharyngeal plosive
⅁	Turned sans-serif capital G			Mathematical symbol for game quantifier used in game theory.
Ꝿ ꝿ	Turned insular G	William Pryce's notation	/ŋ/	
Ɣ ɣ ˠ	Gamma	IPA	/ɣ/	IPA voiced velar fricative, Dagbani, Dinka, Ewe, Ikposo, Kabiyé, Kabyle, Kpelle, Tuareg, Wakhi cf. Greek: Γγ
𝼱	Gamma with palatal hook	Obsolete IPA		
Ɤ ɤ 𐞑	Ram's horn (baby gamma)	IPA	/ɤ/	IPA close-mid back unrounded vowel, Dan, Goo; Superscript form is an IPA superscript letter
Ƣ ƣ	Gha			Tatar (Jaꞑalif script); Azerbaijani
ʜ 𐞖	Small capital H	IPA	/ʜ/	IPA voiceless epiglottal trill; Superscript form is an IPA superscript letter
Ƕ ƕ	Hwair			Gothic
Ⱶ ⱶ	Half H			Claudian letters; cf. Greek: Ⱶⱶ
Ꟶ ꟶ	Reversed half H			Epigraphic letter used in Roman inscriptions from the Roman provinces of Gaul
Ꜧ ꜧ ꭜ	Heng	Teuthonista		Juhuri, cf. Cyrillic: Ӈ ӈ
ı	Dotless I			Turkish, Azerbaijani, and other Turkic languages; Thai transliteration
Ɪ ɪ ᶦ	Small capital I	IPA	/ɪ/	IPA near-close near-front unrounded vowel, capital form used in Unifon and for Gabonese orthographies
ꟾ	Epigraphic letter I Longa			Latin long i /iː/ in epigraphic style
ꟷ	Sideways I			Epigraphic variant of I used in early medieval Celtic inscriptions
ᴉ ᵎ	Turned i	FUT	/ɪ/	
ᵻ ᶧ	Small capital I with stroke	IPA Oxford University Press dictionary convention	English /ɨ/ or /ə/	
𝽮 𝽯	Phonotypic diphthong ai	English Phonotypic Alphabet		
𝽰	I with pigtail at bottom	English Phonotypic Alphabet		
𝽱	Stretched i	English Phonotypic Alphabet		
Ɩ ɩ ᶥ	Iota			Bissa, Kabye; cf. Greek: Ɩ ɩ
J ȷ	Dotless j			Old High German
ᴊ	Small capital J	FUT	/j̊/	
K	Kelvin sign			Kelvin unit of measure temperature; character decomposition is a capital K
ᴋ	Small capital K	FUT		
Ʞ ʞ 𐞾	Turned K	IPA	/ʞ/	IPA back-released click
𝼃	Reversed k	extIPA	/𝼃/	extIPA voiceless velodorsal plosive
𝼐	Small capital turned K	IPA	proposed symbol for generic click phoneme	
ʟ ᶫ	Small capital L	IPA	/ʟ/	IPA voiced velar lateral approximant
		FUT	/l/	
Ꝇ ꝇ	Broken L	Old Norwegian	/lː/	
ᴌ	Small capital L with stroke	FUT		
ꬸ	L with double middle tilde	Teuthonista		
ꬹ	L with middle ring	Teuthonista		
ꬷ ꭝ	L with inverted lazy S	Teuthonista		
ꝲ	Lum			Medieval abbreviation
Ꞁ ꞁ	Turned L	William Pryce's notation of Welsh	/ɬ/	
⅃	Reversed sans-serif capital L			
Ꟛ ꟛ	Lambda	Salishan and Wakashan languages		
ᴍ	Small capital M	FUT	/m̥/	
ꬺ	M with crossed-tail	Teuthonista		
ꟽ	Epigraphic letter inverted M			
ꟿ	Epigraphic letter archaic M			
ꝳ	Mum			Medieval abbreviation
ɴ ᶰ	Small capital N	IPA	/ɴ/	IPA voiced uvular nasal
ɴ ᶰ	Small capital N	FUT	/n̥/	IPA voiced uvular nasal
ᴎ ᴻ	Small capital eng	FUT	/ŋ̊/	cf. Cyrillic: И и
ꬻ	N with crossed-tail	Teuthonista		
ꝴ	Num			Medieval abbreviation
Ŋ ŋ ᵑ	Eng	IPA, Wolof	/ŋ/	IPA voiced velar nasal, Azerbaijani (some dialects), Iñupiat, Sámi (except Southern), Zhuang from 1957 to 1986.
ꬼ	Eng with crossed-tail	Teuthonista		
𝼔	Eng with palatal hook			Used in phonetic transcription
𝼇	Reversed eng			extIPA velodorsal nasal stop
ᴏ	Small capital O	FUT		
ᴑ	Sideways O	FUT		
Ꟁ ꟁ	Old Polish o			
ꬽ	Blackletter O	Teuthonista		
ꬾ	Blackletter O with stroke	Teuthonista		
Ɔ ɔ ᵓ	Open O	IPA	/ɔ/	IPA open-mid back rounded vowel, used in African languages Aghem, Akan, Bafia, Baka, Bariba, Bambara, Baoulé, Bassa, Boko, Dii, Dinka, Duala, Dyula, Ewe, Ewondo, Ikposo, Kako, Kemezung, Kwanja, Lika, Lingala, Maasai, Mandi, Manenguba, Mangbetu, Mbelime, Medumba, Mundani, Nawdm, Ngiemboon, Ngomba, NAwdmNoni, Nuer, Nyang, Pana, Pinyin language, Tigon, Turka, Wuzlam, Yambasa, and Yoruba (Benin).
ᴐ	Small capital open O	FUT		
ꬿ	Open O with stroke	Teuthonista		
ᴒ	Sideways open O	FUT		
ᴖ ᵔ	Top half O	FUT		
ᴗ ᵕ	Bottom half O	FUT		
𝽘 𝿎	Split o	RFE Phonetic Alphabet		
𝽲 𝽳	O with curl	English Phonotypic Alphabet		
Ꞷ ꞷ	Omega			
꟝ ɷ 𐞤	Closed omega	Obsolete IPA, English Phonotypic Alphabet	/ʊ/	Obsolete IPA near-close near-back rounded vowel alternative symbol used until 1989; Superscript form is an IPA superscript letter
𝽴 𝽵	Closed omega with long stem	English Phonotypic Alphabet		
𝽶 𝽷	Turned closed omega	English Phonotypic Alphabet		
𝽠	Omega with loop	Initial Teaching Alphabet		
Ȣ ȣ	Ou			Ligature of Latin o and u
ᴕ ᴽ	Small capital Ou	FUT	a back vowel of uncertain quality	
ᴘ	Small capital P	FUT		
ꟼ	Epigraphic letter reversed P			
ɸ ᶲ	Phi	IPA	/ɸ/	IPA voiceless bilabial fricative, cf. Greek: Φ φ
𝼳	Phi with palatal hook	Obsolete IPA		
ⱷ	Tailless phi	FUT		
ĸ	Kra			Nunatsiavummiut dialect of Inuktitut in Canada, formerly Kalaallisut language of Greenland; cf. Greek: Κ κ
ꞯ	Small capital Q			Japanese linguistics
𐞥	Superscript small q			Used as a superscript IPA letter
𝼴	Q with palatal hook	Obsolete IPA		
Ꞃ ꞃ ᫍ	Insular R			Variant of r; Used in Ormulum
Ʀ ʀ 𐞪	Yr (small capital R)	IPA	/ʀ/	IPA voiced uvular trill, Old Norse, Alutiiq; Superscript form is an IPA superscript letter
Ꝛ ꝛ	R rotunda			Variant of r
ᴙ	Small capital reversed R	Nonstandard IPA	/ʢ/	cf. Cyrillic: Я я
ᴙ	Small capital reversed R	FUT		
ꭆ	Small capital R with right leg	Teuthonista		
𝼵	Small capital R with palatal hook	Obsolete IPA		
ɹ ʴ	Turned R	IPA	/ɹ/	IPA voiced alveolar approximant
ᴚ	Small capital turned R	Obsolete IPA	/χ/	
ᴚ	Small capital turned R	FUT		
ʁ ʶ	Small capital inverted R	IPA	/ʁ/	IPA voiced uvular fricative
𝼶	Small capital inverted R with palatal hook	Obsolete IPA		
ꭉ	R with crossed-tail			Anthropos phonetic transcription system
𝽗 𝿍	Turned r with mid-height left hook	RFE Phonetic Alphabet		
𝽡	R with left tie	Initial Teaching Alphabet		
ꭇ	R without handle	Teuthonista		
ꭈ	Double R			Anthropos phonetic transcription system
ꭊ	Double R with crossed-tail			Anthropos phonetic transcription system
꭬ ꭋ	Script R	Teuthonista		Dania transcription; Swedish Dialect Alphabet
꭭ ꭌ	Script R with ring	Teuthonista		
ꭅ	Stirrup R	Teuthonista		
ꝵ	Rum			Medieval abbreviation
ꝶ	Small capital rum			Medieval abbreviation; cf. the medical abbreviation ℞
Ꝝ ꝝ	Rum rotunda			Medieval abbreviation
ſ	Long S			Former letter of the English, German, Sorbian, and Latvian alphabets
𝾖	Long s with top loop			Historical mathematical symbol for the fifth power of the unknown
Ꟊ ꟊ	S with short stroke overlay			Used for tau gallicum in Gaulish
Ꟍ ꟍ	S with diagonal stroke			Used for Cupeño and Luiseño
Ꞅ ꞅ	Insular S			Variant of s
Ƨ ƨ	Reversed S (Tone two)			A letter used in the Zhuang language from 1957 to 1986 to indicate its second tone, cf. Cyrillic: Ꙅ ꙅ
ꜱ	Small capital S			Medievalist addition
Ꟗ ꟗ	Middle Scots s			Used in Middle Scots
Ꟙ ꟙ	Sigmoid S			Palaeographic addition
Ʃ ʃ ᶴ	Esh	IPA	/ʃ/	IPA voiceless postalveolar fricative, Ewe language; cf. Greek: Σ σ,ς
ꭍ	Baseline Esh	Teuthonista		
ƪ	Reversed Esh loop	Obsolete IPA	/ʃʷ/	
ʅ	Squat reversed esh	Obsolete IPA	/ɻ̩/	Nonstandard phonetic symbol for the syllabic retroflex approximant, used by Sinologists
Ꞇ ꞇ ᫎ	Insular T			Used by William Pryce to designate the voiceless dental fricative [θ]; Used in Ormulum
ᴛ	Small capital T	FUT		
ꝷ	Tum			Medieval abbreviation
Ʇ ʇ 𐞻	Turned T			IPA (obsolete: tenuis dental click)
𝼍	Turned t with curl			Used by Douglas Beach for a nasal click in his phonetic description of Khoekhoe
ᴜ ᶸ	Small capital U	Obsolete IPA	/ʊ/	
ᴝ ᵙ	Sideways U	FUT		
ᴞ	Sideways U with diaeresis	FUT		
ꭒ ꭟ	U with left hook	Teuthonista		Rousselot-Gilliéron transcription system for Gallo-Romance dialectology
ꭎ	U with short right leg	Teuthonista		by Otto Bremer and Jakob Vetsch
ꭏ	U bar with short right leg	Teuthonista		
𝽙 𝿏	Split u	RFE Phonetic Alphabet		
𝽺 𝽻	U with hook tail	English Phonotypic Alphabet		
𝽼 𝽽	U with notch at bottom	English Phonotypic Alphabet		
𝽾 𝽿	Reversed u	English Phonotypic Alphabet		
Ɥ ɥ ᶣ	Turned H	IPA	/ɥ/	IPA voiced labial–palatal approximant, Dan / Gio orthography in Liberia; cf. Cyrillic: Ч ч
Ɯ ɯ	Turned M	IPA	/ɯ/	IPA close back unrounded vowel, Zhuang (1957–1986); cf. Cyrillic: Ш ш
ꟺ ᵚ	Small capital turned M			
ᴟ	Sideways turned M	FUT		
Ʊ ʊ ᶷ	Upsilon	IPA	/ʊ/	IPA near-close near-back rounded vowel, African languages Anii, Anyin, Foodo, Kabiyé, Konni, Lukpa, Tem, Yom; cf. Greek: Υ υ
ᴠ	Small capital V	FUT		
𝼹	V with hook and palatal hook	Obsolete IPA		
Ỽ ỽ	Middle Welsh V			Medieval Welsh
Ʌ ʌ ᶺ	Turned V	IPA	/ʌ/	IPA open-mid back unrounded vowel, Ch'ol, Naninka, Northern Tepehuán, Temne, Wounaan
ᴡ	Small capital W	FUT		
Ꟃ ꟃ	Anglicana W			Middle English, medieval Cornish
ʍ	Turned W	IPA	/ʍ/	IPA voiceless labial–velar fricative
ꭩ	Modifier letter small turned w			Used in linguistic transcriptions of Scots
ꭖ	X with low right ring	Teuthonista		
ꭗ	X with long left leg	Teuthonista		
ꭘ	X with long left leg and low right ring	Teuthonista		
ꭙ	X with long left leg with serif	Teuthonista		
ꭙ̆	X with long left leg with serif and breve	Teuthonista		The reference does not cite this letter and diacritic combination.
ʏ 𐞲	Small capital Y	IPA	/ʏ/	IPA near-close near-front rounded vowel; Superscript form is an IPA superscript letter
ꭚ	Y with short right leg	Teuthonista		Swedish Dialect Alphabet
ʎ 𐞠	Turned y	IPA	/ʎ/	IPA voiced palatal lateral approximant, Maltese (before 1946); Superscript form is an IPA superscript letter
𝼆 𐞡	Turned y with belt	extIPA		Superscript form is an IPA superscript letter
⅄	Turned sans-serif capital Y			Mathematical symbol for a binary operator, normally with three branches of the same length, each at 120° from the next.
ƍ	Turned delta	Obsolete IPA	[ðʷ], /zᵝ/	
ᴢ	Small capital Z	FUT	/z̥/	
𝽦	Reversed Z	Initial Teaching Alphabet		
Ꝣ ꝣ	Visigothic Z			Medieval Ibero-Romance
Ʒ ʒ ᶾ	Ezh	IPA	/ʒ/	IPA voiced postalveolar fricative, Skolt Sámi, Ewe language; cf. Abkhaz: Ӡ ӡ
ᴣ	Small capital Ezh	FUT		
Ƹ ƹ	Ezh reversed	Obsolete IPA	/ʕ/	
Ȝ ȝ	Yogh			Middle English
ꭠ	Sakha Yat			Yakut (historical)
Þ þ	Thorn			Old English, Icelandic
꟒ ꟓ	Double thorn			Used in Ormulum
Ƿ ƿ	Wynn			Old English
꟔ ꟕ	Double wynn			Used in Ormulum
Ꝩ ꝩ	Vend			Medieval Nordic phoneme /v/ or /u/
Ꝫ ꝫ	Et	Medieval abbreviation		
Ꝭ ꝭ	Is	Medieval abbreviation		
Ꝯ ꝯ	Con	Medieval abbreviation		
ꝰ	Us	Medieval abbreviation		
ꝸ	Um	Medieval abbreviation		
Ꜫ ꜫ	Tresillo	Mayan	/qʼ/	Mayan ejective uvular stop /qʼ/
Ꜭ ꜭ	Cuatrillo	Mayan	/kʼ/	Mayan ejective velar stop /kʼ/
Ꜯ ꜯ	Cuatrillo with comma	Mayan	/t͡s’/	Mayan ejective alveolar affricate /tsʼ/
Ƽ ƽ	Tone five	Zhuang	/˧˥/	A letter used in the Zhuang language from 1957 to 1986 to indicate its fifth tone
Ƅ ƅ	Tone six	Zhuang	/˧/	Zhuang (1957–1986: sixth tone)
Ɂ ɂ ʔ	Glottal stop	IPA	/ʔ/	IPA glottal stop, Canadian aboriginal orthographies
Ꞌ ꞌ	Saltillo	Some orthographies in Mexico and Nigeria	/ʔ/	
ꞏ	Middle dot	Sinological tradition (this is not the same character as the middle dot punctuation mark)	/ʔ/	
ᴥ ᵜ	Ain	FUT until 1939	/ʔ/	
ᴤ	Voiced laryngeal spirant	FUT	/ʕ/	
꟎ ꟏ ʕ ˤ	Reversed glottal stop	IPA	/ʕ/	IPA voiced pharyngeal fricative
𝼺	Pharyngeal voiced fricative with palatal hook	Obsolete IPA		
Ꜣ ꜣ	Egyptological alef	Egyptological transcription	/ʔ/~/a/~/ɹ/	
Ꜥ ꜥ	Arabic/Hebrew/Egyptological ꜥayin	Egyptological transcription	/ʕ/~/d/	
ʗ 𐞽	Stretched C	Obsolete IPA	/ǃ/	IPA symbol for alveolar click or tenuis alveolar velar click
ǃ	Alveolar click	IPA	/ǃ/	IPA symbol for alveolar click or tenuis alveolar velar click
ʖ 𐞼	Inverted glottal stop	IPA	/ʖ/	IPA symbol for lateral click or tenuis lateral velar click
ǀ 𐞶	Dental click	IPA	/ǀ/	IPA symbol for dental click or tenuis dental velar click superscript form is an IPA superscript letter
ǁ 𐞷	Lateral click	IPA	/ǁ/	IPA symbol for lateral click or tenuis lateral velar click, superscript form is an IPA superscript letter
ǂ 𐞸	Palatal click	IPA	/ǂ/	IPA symbol for palatal click or tenuis palatal velar click, superscript form is an IPA superscript letter
𝼏	Stretched c with curl	IPA	/ᵑʞ/	Used by Douglas Beach for a nasal click in his phonetic description of Khoekhoe
𝼊 𐞹	Retroflex click with retroflex hook	IPA	/𝼊/	Used to transcribe a retroflex click; Superscript form is an IPA superscript letter
ʘ 𐞵	Bilabial clicks (bullseye)	IPA	/ʘ/	IPA tenuis bilabial click; Superscript form is an IPA superscript letter
ʬ	Bilabial percussive	extIPA	/ʬ/	
ʭ	Bidental percussive	extIPA	/ʭ/	
Ꞛ ꞛ	Volapük AE	Volapük (archaic)	/ɛ/~/æ/	
Ꞝ ꞝ	Volapük OE	Volapük (archaic)	/ø/	
Ꞟ ꞟ	Volapük UE	Volapük (archaic)	/y/	
ꝫ ⁊	Tironian et / Latin small ET	⁊ is from Ireland		

== Letters with diacritics ==
Letters with diacritics.
Letter	Name	Notes
ẚ	A with right half ring	
À à	A with grave	Aghem, Ahlon, Arammba, Awing, Baka, Bali (Adamawa), Bangolan, Basaa, Bekwarra, Berom, Bete-Bendi, Bribri, Burak, Busa (Mande), Cakfem-Mushere, Catalan, Dendi, Dii, Ditammari, Ebira, Emilian, Engenni, Etikwan, Ewe, Ewondo, French, Friulian, Galician, Gbari, Gokana, Hän, Hun-Saare, Hyam, Igede, Igbo, Italian, Izere, Izii, Jen, Jibu, Jukun Takum, Kako, Kaska, Kenyang, Kiowa, Kukele, Kwanja, Limbum, Lithuanian, Lokaa, Luba-Kasai, Mada, Mambila, Manenguba, Masai, Cross River Mbembe, Mbodomo, Medumba, Meta', Minagende, Mumuye, Mundani, Mwaghavul, Nateni, Navajo, Ndogo, Ngangam, Ngbaka, Ngas, Ngiemboon, Ngomba, Ninzo, Norwegian, Ntcham, Ogba, Okpela, Pinyin transliteration, Portuguese, Romagnol, Reshe, Scottish Gaelic, Sekani, Sena, Swedish, Tagish, Tarok, Tee, Tigon, Tutchone, Tyap, Ut-Ma'in, Vietnamese, Waama, Welsh, Western Frisian, Yoruba, and Zurich German (some spellings); Pe̍h-oē-jī, Taiwanese Romanization System
Á á	A with acute	Afrikaans, Aghem, Ahlon, Arammba, Awing, Bafia, Bafut, Baka, Bangolan, Basaa, Bekwarra, Berom, Bete-Bendi, Blackfoot, Boko (Benin), Boikin, Bribri, Burak, Busa (Mande), Cakfem-Mushere, ithk, Czech, Danish, Dendi, Dii, Ditammari, Duala, Dutch, Ebira, Ekajuk, Etikwan, Ewe, Ewondo, Faroese, Galician, Gadsup, Gbari, Gourmanchéma, Gunu, Hungarian, Ibani, Icelandic, Idoma, Igbo, Ikwere, Iñapari, Irigwe, Irish, Jibu, Jola-Fonyi, Jukun Takum, Kako, Kamwe, Karkar-Yuri, Kaska, Kemezung, Kiowa, Kutep, Kwanja, Kwasio, Lakota, Lingala, Lithuanian, Lycian transliteration, Mambila, Mandi, Manenguba, Masai, Cross River Mbembe, Mbelime, Mbodomo, Medumba, Miyobe, Mmaala, Mwaghavul, Nateni, Navajo, Ngangam, Ngiemboon, Ngomba, Nkonya, Nomaande, Noni, Norwegian, Ntcham, Nukna, Nyang, Nzime, Occitan, Ogba, Omaha-Ponca, Osage, Pana, Paasaal, Pinyin transliteration, Pongu, Portuguese, Proto-Indo-European transcription, Pu-Xian Min, Reshe, Romanian, Sámi, Scottish Gaelic, Sekani, Sena, Seneca, Senoufo, Sisaala, Slovak, Accented Slovenian, Southern Balochi, Sokoro, Spanish, Sranan Tongo, Sursurunga, Tee, Tem, Tigon, Tongan, Tsuvadi, Tucano, Tunen, Tutchone, Tyap, Vai, Vietnamese, Walser, Wára, Welsh, Winnebago, Yaghnobi, Yambeta, Yambasa, Yangben, Yele, Yoruba, and Yurutí; Pe̍h-oē-jī, Taiwanese Romanization System
Â â	A with circumflex	Awing, Bangolan, Berber, Dutch, Emilian, Ewondo, French, Friulian, Frisian, Hän, Istro-Romanian, Jarai, Kako, Kaska, Kiowa, Kwanja, Accented Latvian, Lingala, Luxembourgish, Manenguba, Medumba, Mengleno-Romanian, Ngbaka Minagende, Ngiemboon, Norwegian, Nzime, Ogba, Old High German, Pana, Proto-Germanic transcription, Portuguese, Pu-Xian Min, Romagnol, Romanian, Sámi, Serer, Tagish, Tigon, Turkish, Vietnamese, Walloon, Welsh, and Yoruba; Pe̍h-oē-jī, Taiwanese Romanization System, iSO 9
Ầ ầ	A with circumflex and grave	Vietnamese
Ấ ấ	A with circumflex and acute	Vietnamese
Ẫ ẫ	A with circumflex and tilde	Vietnamese
Ẩ ẩ	A with circumflex and hook above	Vietnamese
Ã ã	A with tilde	Apalai, Aromanian, Bariba, Boko, Bribri, Gokana, Guaraní, Kashubian, Kaska, Accented Latvian, Lithuanian, Lycian transliteration, Ngbaka Minagende, Proto-Indo-European transcription, Portuguese, Tee, Tucano, Turka, Vietnamese, !Xóõ, Yoruba, Yurutí, Old Norse
Ã̀ ã̀	A with tilde and grave	Boko, Bribri, Gokana, Ngbaka Minagende, Tee
Ã́ ã́	A with tilde and acute	Bribri, Lycian transliteration, Tee, Tucano, Yurutí
Ã̂ ã̂	A with tilde and circumflex	Ngbaka Minagende
Ã̌ ã̌	A with tilde and caron	Boko, Ngbaka Minagende
Ã̍ ã̍	A with tilde and vertical line	Ngbaka Minagende
Ã̎ ã̎	A with tilde and double vertical line	
Ā ā	A with macron	Arabic transliteration, Aten, Bangolan, Ewondo, Hawaiian, Igbo, Kaska, Kiowa, Latin, Latvian, Māori, Mbelime, Medumba, Middle High German, Nahuatl, Nyakyusa, Nyang, Ogba, Old Sámi orthography, Pinyin (both language and Chinese transliteration system), Proto-Germanic transcription, Proto-Indo-European transcription, Pu-Xian Min, Samoan, Samogitian, Sanskrit transliteration, Sindhi transliteration, Syriac transliteration, Tagish, Tahitian, Tongan, Tutchone, Wuzlam; Pe̍h-oē-jī, Taiwanese Romanization System, Thai transliteration
Ā̀ ā̀	A with macron and grave	Kaska, Sanskrit Transliteration, Tagish, Ancient Greek transliteration
Ā́ ā́	A with macron and acute	Kaska, Proto-Indo-European transcription, Sanskrit Transliteration, Ancient Greek transliteration
Ā̂ ā̂	A with macron and circumflex	Kaska, Proto-Baltic transcription, Tagish
Ā̃ ā̃	A with macron and tilde	Proto-Indo-European transcription, Sanskrit Transliteration
Ā̃́ ā̃́	A with macron, tilde and acute	Proto-Indo-European transcription
Ā̄ ā̄	A with macron and macron	Kienning Colloquial Romanized transliteration
Ā̆ ā̆	A with macron and breve	Latin, Middle High German, Proto-Indo-European transcription
Ā̆́ ā̆́	A with macron, breve and acute	
Ā̈ ā̈	A with macron and diaeresis	Svan transliteration
Ā̊ ā̊	A with macron and ring above	Avestan transliteration
Ā̌ ā̌	A with macron and caron	Indo-Iranian dialectology, Kaska, Tagish
Ă ă	A with breve	Istro-Romanian, Jarai, Latin, Mengleno-Romanian, Middle High German, Romanian, Old Sámi orthography, Vietnamese; previously used in Malay; ISO 9; cf. Cyrillic: Ӑ ӑ
Ằ ằ	A with breve and grave	Vietnamese
Ắ ắ	A with breve and acute	Vietnamese
Ẵ ẵ	A with breve and tilde	Vietnamese
Ẳ ẳ	A with breve and hook above	Vietnamese
Ȧ ȧ	A with dot above	Cheyenne, Old High German, Old Sámi orthography, Ulithian
Ȧ́ ȧ́	A with dot above and acute	
Ǡ ǡ	A with dot above and macron	Old Sámi orthography
Ä ä	A with diaeresis	Dinka, Dutch, Emilian, Estonian, Finnish, Gagauz, German, Hän, Kaqchikel, Karelian, Luxembourgish, North Frisian, Norwegian, Romagnol, Rotuman, Sámi, Saterlandic, Seneca, Slovak, Swedish, Tatar, Turkmen, Tutchone, West Frisian, Welsh, and Yapese; previously used in Azerbaijani; ISO 9; cf. Cyrillic: Ӓ ӓ
Ä́ ä́	A with diaeresis and acute	Seneca, Tutchone, Cabécar, Old High German
Ä̀ ä̀	A with diaeresis and grave	Hän, Tutchone
Ä̂ ä̂	A with diaeresis and circumflex	Hän, Middle Low German
Ä̃ ä̃	A with diaeresis and tilde	Arikapú, Nadëb
Ǟ ǟ	A with diaeresis and macron	Livonian, Middle High German, Old Sámi orthography, Tutchone
Ǟ̆ ǟ̆	A with diaeresis, macron and breve	Sogdian transliteration
Ä̆ ä̆	A with diaeresis and breve	Caucasian dialectology
Ä̌ ä̌	A with diaeresis and caron	Hän
Ả ả	A with hook above	Vietnamese, Thai transliteration
Å å	A with ring above	Bolognese dialect, Chamorro, Danish, Greenlandic, Istro-Romanian, Old High German, North Frisian, Norwegian, Sámi, Swedish, and Walloon, Measurements (in the form of the Ångström)
Å	Angstrom sign	Ångström unit of measure for length, preferred representation is Å (A with ring above)
Ǻ ǻ	A with ring above and acute	Danish
Å̂ å̂	A with ring above and circumflex	Old High German
Å̃ å̃	A with ring above and tilde	North Germanic dialectology
Å̄ å̄	A with ring above and macron	North Germanic dialectology, Norwegian Dictionaries, Old Sámi orthography
Å̄̆ å̄̆	A with ring above, macron and breve	Germanic dialectology
Å̆ å̆	A with ring above and breve	Old High German
A̋ a̋	A with double acute	ISO 9, Old High German, Slovak (rarely used), Taiwanese Romanization System
Ǎ ǎ	A with caron	Awing, Bangolan, Ewondo, Hän, Hyam, Kaska, Kemezung, Kwanja, Lingala, Manenguba, Medumba, Mundani, Ngbaka Minagende, Ngiemboon, Ngomba, Nzime, Pinyin, Pinyin transliteration, Tagish, Tigon, Yoruba
A̍ a̍	A with vertical line	Ngbaka Minagende, Pe̍h-ōe-jī, Taiwanese Romanization System and other transliterations of Chinese dialects.
A̎ a̎	A with double vertical line	Pe̍h-ōe-jī, Taiwanese Romanization System and other transliterations of Chinese dialects.
Ȁ ȁ	A with double grave	Bangolan, Croatian, Accented Slovenian
Ȃ ȃ	A with inverted breve	Croatian, Glagolitic transliteration, Accented Slovenian
A̐ a̐	A with chandrabindu	ALA-LC
A̓ a̓	A with comma above	Greek transliteration, Heiltsuk
A̧ a̧	A with cedilla	General Alphabet of Cameroon Languages: Dii, Mundani, and Pana
À̧ à̧	A with grave and cedilla	Dii, Mundani
Á̧ á̧	A with acute and cedilla	Dii, Pana
Â̧ â̧	A with circumflex and cedilla	Pana
Ǎ̧ ǎ̧	A with caron and cedilla	Mundani
A̭ a̭	A with circumflex below	Juǀʼhoansi
A̰ a̰	A with tilde below	Kharosthi transliteration, Ngambay, Zarma
À̰ à̰	A with tilde below and grave	Nateni
Á̰ á̰	A with tilde below and acute	Mbelime, Nateni
Ā̰ ā̰	A with tilde below and macron	Mbelime
Ä̰ ä̰	A with tilde below and diaeresis	
Ä̰́ ä̰́	A with tilde below, diaeresis and acute	
Ą ą	A with ogonek	Chipewyan, Creek, Elfdalian, Gwich'in, Hän, Hocąk, Iñapari, Kashubian, Kaska, Lithuanian, Mescalero-Chiricahua, Navajo, Polish, Sekani, Tagish, Tlingit, Tutchone, Western Apache, and Winnebago
Ą̀ ą̀	A with grave and ogonek	Hän, Kaska, Sekani, Tagish, Tlicho, Tutchone
Ą́ ą́	A with acute and ogonek	Chipewyan, Iñapari, Kaska, Lithuanian, Navajo, Omaha-Ponca, Osage, Sekani, Tutchone, Winnebago
Ą̂ ą̂	A with circumflex and ogonek	Hän, Kaska, Tagish
Ą̃ ą̃	A with tilde and ogonek	Lithuanian
Ą̄ ą̄	A with macron and ogonek	Kaska, Tagish, Tutchone, Old Norse, Proto-Germanic transcription, Tagish, Tutchone
Ą̄̀ ą̄̀	A with macron, grave and ogonek	Kaska, Tagish
Ą̄́ ą̄́	A with macron, acute and ogonek	Kaska, Old Norse
Ą̄̂ ą̄̂	A with macron, circumflex and ogonek	Kaska, Tagish
Ą̄̌ ą̄̌	A with macron, caron and ogonek	Kaska, Tagish
Ą̇ ą̇	A with dot above and ogonek	Avestan transliteration
Ą̈ ą̈	A with diaeresis and ogonek	Hän, Southern Tutchone
Ą̈̀ ą̈̀	A with diaeresis, grave and ogonek	Hän
Ą̈́ ą̈́	A with diaeresis, acute and ogonek	Southern Tutchone
Ą̈̂ ą̈̂	A with diaeresis, circumflex and ogonek	Hän
Ą̈̌ ą̈̌	A with diaeresis, caron and ogonek	Hän
Ą̈̄ ą̈̄	A with diaeresis, macron and ogonek	
Ą̊ ą̊	A with ring above and ogonek	Elfdalian
Ą̌ ą̌	A with caron and ogonek	Hän, Tagish
Ą̋ ą̋	A with double acute and ogonek	
Ą̱ ą̱	A with ogonek and line below	
Ą̱̀ ą̱̀	A with ogonek, line below and grave	
Ą̱́ ą̱́	A with ogonek, line below and acute	
A᷎ a᷎	A with ogonek above	
A̱ a̱	A with line below	Arabic transliteration, Bribri, Coast Tsimshian, Estonian Swedish, Germanic dialectology, Hyam, Kiowa, Koasati, Kwak'wala, Mazatec, Nuer, Seneca, Shingini, Aguaruna
À̱ à̱	A with line below and grave	Kiowa
Á̱ á̱	A with line below and acute	Kiowa, Seneca
Â̱ â̱	A with line below and circumflex	Kiowa
Ã̱ ã̱	A with line below and tilde	Nambikwara, Ticuna
Ā̱ ā̱	A with line below and macron	Kiowa
Ā̱̀ ā̱̀	A with line below, macron, and grave	Kiowa
Ā̱́ ā̱́	A with line below, macron, and acute	Kiowa
Ā̱̂ ā̱̂	A with line below, macron, and circumflex	Kiowa
Ä̱ ä̱	A with line below and diaeresis	Estonian Swedish, Germanic dialectology, Seneca
Ä̱̀ ä̱̀	A with line below, diaeresis and grave	
Ä̱́ ä̱́	A with line below, diaeresis and acute	
Ä̱̂ ä̱̂	A with line below, diaeresis and circumflex	
Ä̱̌ ä̱̌	A with line below, diaeresis and caron	
Å̱ å̱	A with line below and ring above	Estonian Swedish
Ǎ̱ ǎ̱	A with line below and caron	Hyam
A̱̥ a̱̥	A with line below and ring below	Semitic linguistics
Ạ ạ	A with dot below	Avokaya, Thompson, Vietnamese, Thai transliteration
Ạ́ ạ́	A with acute and dot below	Thompson
Ạ̀ ạ̀	A with grave and dot below	Thompson
Ậ ậ	A with circumflex and dot below	Vietnamese
Ạ̃ ạ̃	A with tilde and dot below	ISO 9
Ạ̄ ạ̄	A with macron and dot below	ALA-LC romanization
Ặ ặ	A with breve and dot below	Vietnamese
Ạ̈ ạ̈	A with diaeresis and dot below	ISO 9, Middle Low German
Ạ̈̀ ạ̈̀	A with diaeresis and grave and dot below	
Ạ̈́ ạ̈́	A with diaeresis, acute and dot below	
Ạ̈̂ ạ̈̂	A with diaeresis, circumflex and dot below	
Ạ̈̌ ạ̈̌	A with diaeresis, caron and dot below	
Ạ̌ ạ̌	A with caron and dot below	ABC Chinese–English Dictionary Hanyu Pinyin
Ạ̍ ạ̍	A with vertical line and dot below	
A̤ a̤	A with diaeresis below	Uighur transliteration, Pu-Xian Min
À̤ à̤	A with diaeresis below and grave	Eastern Min
Á̤ á̤	A with diaeresis below and acute	Kayah, Eastern Min, Pu-Xian Min
Â̤ â̤	A with diaeresis below and circumflex	Eastern Min, Pu-Xian Min
Ä̤ ä̤	A with diaeresis below and diaeresis	IPA
Ḁ ḁ	A with ring below	Arabic transliteration, Pashto transliteration, Persian transliteration
Ḁ̂ ḁ̂	A with ring below and circumflex	Arabic transliteration, Pashto transliteration, Persian transliteration
Ḁ̈ ḁ̈	A with ring below and diaeresis	
A̯ a̯	A with inverted breve below	IPA and other phonetic alphabets
A̩ a̩	A with vertical line below	
À̩ à̩	A with vertical line below and grave	
Á̩ á̩	A with vertical line below and acute	
Â̩ â̩	A with vertical line below and circumflex	
Ã̩ ã̩	A with vertical line below and tilde	
Ā̩ ā̩	A with vertical line below and macron	
Ǎ̩ ǎ̩	A with vertical line below and caron	
A̩̍ a̩̍	A with vertical line below and vertical line	
A̩̓ a̩̓	A with vertical line below and comma above	
A͔ a͔	A with left arrowhead below	Uralic dialectology
Ā͔ ā͔	A with left arrowhead below and macron	Uralic dialectology
Ⱥ ⱥ	A with stroke	Mazahua, Saanich
Ⱥ̀ ⱥ̀	A with stroke and grave	
Ⱥ́ ⱥ́	A with stroke and acute	
ᶏ	A with retroflex hook	Previously in IPA
Ꞻ ꞻ	Glottal A	Ugaritic transliteration
Ɑ̀ ɑ̀	Alpha with grave	Medumba, Nuni, Tigon
Ɑ́ ɑ́	Alpha with acute	Medumba, Nzime, Tigon
Ɑ̂ ɑ̂	Alpha with circumflex	Medumba, Tigon
Ɑ̃ ɑ̃	Alpha with tilde	
Ɑ̄ ɑ̄	Alpha with macron	Medumba
Ɑ̆ ɑ̆	Alpha with breve	
Ɑ̇ ɑ̇	Alpha with dot above	
Ɑ̈ ɑ̈	Alpha with diaeresis	
Ɑ̊ ɑ̊	Alpha with ring above	
Ɑ̌ ɑ̌	Alpha with caron	Medumba, Tigon
ᶐ	Alpha with retroflex hook	Previously in IPA
B̀ b̀	B with grave	Ntcham
B́ b́	B with acute	Ntcham, Võro; previously used in Sorbian
B̂ b̂	B with circumflex	Middle Persian transliteration
B̃ b̃	B with tilde	Yanesha', Old Irish
B̄ b̄	B with macron	Kire, Sindhi transliteration (Lepsius)
Ḃ ḃ	B with dot above	Irish (old orthography), Old High German
B̈ b̈	B with diaeresis	Manichaean transliteration
B̒ b̒	B with turned comma above	
B̕ b̕	B with comma above right	Americanist phonetics
Ḇ ḇ	B with line below	Carian transliteration, Hebrew romanization, Middle Persian transliteration, Sindhi transliteration
Ḇ̂ ḇ̂	B with line below and circumflex	Middle Persian transliteration
Ḅ ḅ	B with dot below	Ikwerre, Kalabari, Saraiki transliteration
B̤ b̤	B with diaeresis below	Sindhi transliteration
B̥ b̥	B with ring below	IPA
B̬ b̬	B with caron below	IPA and other phonetic alphabets
Ƀ ƀ	B with stroke	Jarai, Proto-Germanic transcription
ᵬ	B with middle tilde	
ᶀ	B with palatal hook	
Ɓ ɓ 𐞅	B with hook	Voiced bilabial implosive, Balanta, Basaa, Bomu, Bushi, Dan, Fula, Hausa, Karai-karai, Kpelle, Maore, Ngizim, and Serer; formerly used in Shona; Superscript form is an IPA superscript letter
Ƃ ƃ	B with topbar	Letter in the Zhuang Language from 1957 to 1986
B̪ b̪	B with bridge below	Voiced labiodental plosive
ʙ̇	Small capital B with dot above	
ʙ̣	Small capital B with dot below	
C̀ c̀	C with grave	ISO 9
Ć ć	C with acute	Belarusian, Bosnian, Croatian, Montenegrin, Polish, Romani, Serbian, Sorbian, and Võro
Ĉ ĉ	C with circumflex	Esperanto, Glagolitic transliteration, Pinyin transliteration
C̃ c̃	C with tilde	Yanesha'
C̄ c̄	C with macron	ALA-LC, ISO 9, Kharosthi transliteration, Runic transliteration, Thai transliteration
C̄́ c̄́	C with macron and acute	Runic transliteration
C̆ c̆	C with breve	ISO 9, Jarai
Ċ ċ	C with dot above	ISO 9, Maltese, Chechen, Irish (old orthography), Old High German, Old English
C̈ c̈	C with diaeresis	ISO 9, Old German abbreviation
Č č	C with caron	Belarusian, Berber, Bosnian, Comox, Croatian, Czech, Estonian, Glagolitic transliteration, Jarai, Lakota, Latvian, Lithuanian, Livonian, Ithkuil transliteration, Romani, Sámi, Slovak, Slovenian, Syriac Latin, and Wakhi
Č́ č́	C with caron and acute above	Uralic linguistics
Č͑ č͑	C with caron and left half ring above	Armenian transliteration
Č̓ č̓	C with caron and comma above	Comox
Č̕ č̕	C with caron and comma above right	Americanist phonetics
Č̔ č̔	C with caron and reversed comma above	Georgian transliteration
C̋ c̋	C with double acute	
C̓ c̓	C with comma above	Comox, Ditidaht, Haisla, Heiltsuk, Nuxalk, Thompson
C̓́ c̓́	C with comma above and acute	Romance dialectology
C̕ c̕	C with comma above right	Americanist phonetics
C̔ c̔	C with reversed comma above	Georgian transliteration
C͑ c͑	C with left half ring above	Armenian transliteration
Ç ç	C with cedilla	Albanian, Azerbaijani, Catalan, Chechen, Emiliano-Romagnolo, French, Friulian, Kurdish, Ligurian, Manx, Occitan, Portuguese, Romanian, Ithkuil transliteration, Tatar, Turkish, Turkmen, Venetian, Zazaki; Voiceless palatal fricative
Ḉ ḉ	C with cedilla and acute	Abaza, Abkhaz, and Adyghe transliteration, Kurdish
Ç̆ ç̆	C with cedilla and breve	ISO 9
Ç̇ ç̇	C with cedilla and dot above	Chechen
Ç̌ ç̌	C with cedilla and caron	Abaza, Abkhaz, and Adyghe transliteration
ꞔ	Small C with palatal hook	Lithuanian dialectology
Ꞔ	Capital C with palatal hook	Mandarin Chinese using the early draft version of pinyin romanization during the mid-1950s
𝼝	C with retroflex hook	Para-IPA version of the IPA retroflex tʂ
C̦ c̦	C with comma below	
C̭ c̭	C with circumflex below	Neo-Aramaic transliteration
C̱ c̱	C with line below	
C̮ c̮	C with breve below	Romance dialectology
C̣ c̣	C with dot below	Armenian transliteration, Georgian transliteration, Thai transliteration
Ć̣ ć̣	C with dot below and acute	Georgian transliteration
Č̣ č̣	C with dot below and caron	Armenian transliteration, Georgian transliteration, Wakhi, Amharic transliteration, Gəˁəz transliteration
C̥ c̥	C with ring below	IPA and other phonetic alphabets
C̬ c̬	C with caron below	IPA
C̯ c̯	C with inverted breve below	Old Persian transliteration
C̨ c̨	C with ogonek	Panzavecchia’s Maltese alphabet
Ȼ ȼ	C with stroke	Kutenai, Saanich; Previously used in Latvian
Ȼ̓ ȼ̓	C with stroke and comma above	Kutenai
Ꞓ ꞓ	C with bar	Previously in Nanai
Ƈ ƈ	C with hook	Obsolete symbol for voiceless palatal implosive, Serer
ɕ ᶝ	C with curl	IPA voiceless alveolo-palatal fricative, 1956-1958 Yi mixed script alphabet
Ꜿ ꜿ	Reversed C with dot	Medieval abbreviation
D́ d́	D with acute	Võro, Kharosthi transliteration, ALA-LC transliteration
D̂ d̂	D with circumflex	ISO 9
D̃ d̃	D with tilde	
D̄ d̄	D with macron	Basque (alternative orthography)
Ḋ ḋ	D with dot above	Irish (Old orthography), Old High German
D̊ d̊	D with ring above	German Abbreviation
Ď ď	D with caron	Czech, Romani, Slovak
D̑ d̑	D with inverted breve	Glagolitic transliteration
D̓ d̓	D with comma above	Ditidaht
D̕ d̕	D with comma above right	
Ḑ ḑ	D with cedilla	Arabic transliteration, Livonian
D̦ d̦	D with comma below	Old Romanian
Ḓ ḓ	D with circumflex below	Venda
Ḏ ḏ	D with line below	Arabic transliteration, Syriac transliteration, Hebrew romanization, Middle Persian transliteration, O'odham, Sindhi transliteration
D̮ d̮	D with breve below	Romance dialectology
Ḍ ḍ	D with dot below	Arabic transliteration, Berber, Engenni, Kalabari, Kharosthi transliteration, O'odham, Pokomo, Sanskrit transliteration, Sindhi transliteration, Thai transliteration, Wakhi
Ḍ́ ḍ́	D with dot below and acute	Kharosthi transliteration
Ḍ̄ ḍ̄	D with dot below and macron	Sindhi transliteration (Lepsius)
D̤ d̤	D with diaeresis below	Mandaic transliteration, Sindhi transliteration, Tifinagh transliteration
D̥ d̥	D with ring below	IPA and other phonetic alphabets
D̬ d̬	D with caron below	IPA
D̪ d̪	D with bridge below	IPA
Đ đ	D with stroke	Bosnian, Croatian, Jarai, Katu, Sámi (except Lule and Southern), Vietnamese, Middle Persian Transliteration, Ithkuil transliteration
Đ̣ đ̣	D with stroke and dot below	Inari Sami
Đ̱ đ̱	D with stroke and line below	Middle Persian Transliteration
ᵭ	D with middle tilde	
𝼥	D with mid-height left hook	Used by the British and Foreign Bible Society in the early 20th century for romanization of the Malayalam language.
ᶁ	D with palatal hook	
Ɖ ɖ 𐞋	African D/D with tail	Voiced retroflex plosive; Bassa, Ewe; Superscript form is an IPA superscript letter
Ɗ ɗ 𐞌	D with hook	Voiced alveolar implosive; Bushi, Fula, Hausa, Karai-karai, Maore, Serer; formerly used in Shona; Superscript form is an IPA superscript letter
ᶑ 𐞍	D with hook and tail	IPA; reportedly used in Ngad'a; Superscript form is an IPA superscript letter
Ƌ ƌ	D with topbar	Letter of the Zhuang language from 1957 to 1986
ȡ	D with curl	Voiced alveolo-palatal stop
Ꝺ́ ꝺ́	Insular D with acute	
Ꝺ̇ ꝺ̇	Insular D with dot above	
ᴅ̇	Small capital D with dot above	
ᴅ̣	Small capital D with dot below	
Ð́ ð́	Eth with acute	
Ð̣ ð̣	Eth with dot below	
È è	E with grave	Afrikaans, Catalan, Dutch, Emiliano-Romagnolo, French, Friulian, Igbo, Italian, Luba-Kasai, Luxembourgish, Maltese, Ndogo, Ngangam, Noni, Norwegian, Occitan, Pinyin transliteration, Scottish Gaelic, Old Sámi orthography, Swedish, Vietnamese, Welsh, Yoruba, Zurich German (some spellings); previously used in Romanian; cf. Cyrillic: Ѐ ѐ
É é	E with acute	Afrikaans, Catalan, Czech, Danish, Dutch, Emiliano-Romagnolo, English, Ewondo, French, Galician, Hungarian, Icelandic, Igbo, Irish, Italian, Kashubian, Luxembourgish, Lycian Transliteration, Nateni, Ngiemboon, Nomaande, Norwegian, Ntcham, Occitan, Oku, Proto-Indo-European transcription, Pinyin transliteration, Portuguese, Rigwe, Romanian, Old Sámi orthography, Scottish Gaelic, Serer, Slovak, Accented Slovenian, Spanish, Swedish, Vietnamese, Welsh, Yaghnobi, Yoruba
Ê ê	E with circumflex	Afrikaans, Dutch, Emiliano-Romagnolo, Ewondo, French, Friulian, Glagolitic transliteration, Jarai, Kurdish, Accented Latvian, Luxembourgish, Norwegian, Pinyin transliteration, Portuguese, Vietnamese, Welsh, Yoruba; Kurdish Kurmanji; Ukrainian transliteration
Ề ề	E with circumflex and grave	Vietnamese, Pinyin transliteration
Ế ế	E with circumflex and acute	Vietnamese, Pinyin transliteration
Ễ ễ	E with circumflex and tilde	Vietnamese
Ê̄ ê̄	E with circumflex and macron	Pinyin transliteration
Ê̆ ê̆	E with circumflex and breve	Jarai
Ê̌ ê̌	E with circumflex and caron	Pinyin transliteration
Ể ể	E with circumflex and hook above	Vietnamese
Ẽ ẽ	E with tilde	Apalai, Bribri, Ewe, Frafra Gokana, Guaraní, Accented Latvian, Lithuanian, Lycian transliteration, Proto-Indo-European transcription, Tee, Tucano, Umbundu, Vietnamese, Yurutí, Zarma
Ẽ̀ ẽ̀	E with tilde and grave	
Ẽ́ ẽ́	E with tilde and acute	Lycian transliteration
Ẽ̂ ẽ̂	E with tilde and circumflex	
Ẽ̌ ẽ̌	E with tilde and caron	
Ẽ̍ ẽ̍	E with tilde and vertical line	
Ẽ̎ ẽ̎	E with tilde and double vertical line	
Ē ē	E with macron	Aramaic transliteration, Aten, Creek, Emiliano-Romagnolo, Ewondo, Greek transliteration, Hawaiian, Hiw, Igbo, Kaska, Latin, Latvian, Livonian, Māori, Mwotlap, Samoan, Samogitian, Pali and Syriac transliteration, Old Sámi orthography, Tahitian, Tongan, Vurës
Ḕ ḕ	E with macron and grave	Aramaic transliteration, Ancient Greek transliteration, Pali transliteration
Ḗ ḗ	E with macron and acute	Aramaic transliteration, Ancient Greek transliteration, Proto-Indo-European transcription, Pali transliteration
Ē̂ ē̂	E with macron and circumflex	Proto-Baltic transcription
Ē̃ ē̃	E with macron and tilde	Pali transliteration, Proto-Indo-European transcription
Ē̃́ ē̃́	E with macron and tilde and acute	Proto-Indo-European transcription
Ē̄ ē̄	E with macron and macron	Kienning Colloquial Romanized transliteration
Ē̆ ē̆	E with macron and breve	Latin, Proto-Indo-European transcription
Ē̆́ ē̆́	E with macron and breve and acute	
Ē̌ ē̌	E with macron and caron	Indo-Iranian dialectology
Ē̑ ē̑	E with macron and inverted breve	Glagolitic transliteration
Ĕ ĕ	E with breve	Chuvash, Jarai, Latin, Old Sámi orthography, Slavic dialectology, Tulu transliteration Yaghnobi; previously used in Malay and Romanian; cf. Cyrillic: Ӗ ӗ
Ĕ̀ ĕ̀	E with breve and grave	
Ĕ́ ĕ́	E with breve and acute	Yaghnobi
Ĕ̄ ĕ̄	E with breve and macron	Slavic dialectology, Selkup transliteration, Tulu transliteration
Ė ė	E with dot above	Cheyenne, Lithuanian, Old High German, Samogitian, Ulithian
Ė́ ė́	E with dot above and acute	Lithuanian
Ė̃ ė̃	E with dot above and tilde	Lithuanian
Ė̄ ė̄	E with dot above and macron	Samogitian
Ë ë	E with diaeresis	Afrikaans, Albanian, Armenian transliteration, Dutch, Emiliano-Romagnolo, French, Hän, Hiw, Italian, Kaqchikel, Kashubian, Low Saxon, Luxembourgish, Norwegian, Old High German, Old Lithuanian, Ripuarian German, Seneca, Swedish, Syriac transliteration, Taiwanese Hokkien, Uighur, Vurës, Welsh, Yapese; cf. Cyrillic: Ё ё
Ë̀ ë̀	E with diaeresis and grave	
Ë́ ë́	E with diaeresis and acute	Old High German, Old Lithuanian, Cabécar
Ë̂ ë̂	E with diaeresis and circumflex	
Ë̃ ë̃	E with diaeresis and tilde	Old High German, Old Lithuanian
Ë̄ ë̄	E with diaeresis and macron	Old High German
Ë̌ ë̌	E with diaeresis and caron	
Ẻ ẻ	E with hook above	Vietnamese
E̊ e̊	E with ring above	Old High German, Runic transliteration, Walloon
E̊̄ e̊̄	E with ring above and macron	Runic transliteration
E̋ e̋	E with double acute	Old High German, Pe̍h-ōe-jī
Ě ě	E with caron	Awing, Bangolan, Czech, Ewondo, Glagolitic transliteration, Hän, Hyam, Kaska, Kemezung, Kwanja, Lingala, Manenguba, Medumba, Mundani, Ngbaka Minagende, Ngiemboon, Ngomba, Nzime, Old Church Slavonic transliteration, Pinyin transliteration, Sorbian, Tagish, Tigon, Yoruba
Ě́ ě́	E with caron and acute	Old Church Slavonic transliteration, Proto-Slavic transcription
Ě̃ ě̃	E with caron and tilde	Proto-Slavic transcription
Ě̋ ě̋	E with caron and double acute	Old Church Slavonic transliteration, Proto-Slavic transcription
Ě̑ ě̑	E with caron and inverted breve	Glagolitic transliteration
E̍ e̍	E with vertical line	Pe̍h-ōe-jī, Taiwanese Romanization System
E̎ e̎	E with double vertical line	
Ȅ ȅ	E with double grave	Croatian, Accented Slovenian
Ȇ ȇ	E with inverted breve	Croatian, Glagolitic transliteration, Accented Slovenian
E̓ e̓	E with comma above	Greek transliteration
E᷎ e᷎	E with ogonek above	
Ȩ ȩ	E with cedilla	Romance linguistics, Dii, Hebrew romanization, Mundani, Pana
Ȩ̀ ȩ̀	E with grave and cedilla	
Ȩ́ ȩ́	E with acute and cedilla	Romance linguistics
Ȩ̂ ȩ̂	E with circumflex and cedilla	
Ḝ ḝ	E with breve and cedilla	Hebrew romanization
Ȩ̌ ȩ̌	E with caron and cedilla	
Ẽ̦ ẽ̦	E with comma below and tilde	Slavic dialectology
Ę ę	E with ogonek	Apache, Chipewyan, Creek, Elfdalian, Gwich'in, Han, Iñapari, Kaska, Lithuanian, Mescalero-Chiricahua, Navajo, Old High German, Old Norse, Polish, Sekani, Tagish, Tlingit, Tutchone, Winnebago
Ę̀ ę̀	E with grave and ogonek	Tlicho, Winnebago
Ę́ ę́	E with acute and ogonek	Old Norse, Romance dialectology, Lithuanian, Navajo, Winnebago
Ę̂ ę̂	E with circumflex and ogonek	Middle Low German
Ę̃ ę̃	E with tilde and ogonek	Lithuanian, Romance dialectology
Ę̃́ ę̃́	E with tilde, acute and ogonek	Romance dialectology
Ę̄ ę̄	E with macron and ogonek	Proto-Germanic transcription, Romance dialectology
Ę̄̀ ę̄̀	E with macron, grave and ogonek	Romance dialectology
Ę̄́ ę̄́	E with macron, acute and ogonek	Romance dialectology
Ę̄̂ ę̄̂	E with macron, circumflex and ogonek	
Ę̄̃ ę̄̃	E with macron, tilde and ogonek	Romance dialectology
Ę̄̌ ę̄̌	E with macron, caron and ogonek	
Ę̆ ę̆	E with breve and ogonek	Slavic dialectology
Ę̇ ę̇	E with dot above and ogonek	
Ę̇́ ę̇́	E with dot above, acute and ogonek	
Ę̈ ę̈	E with diaeresis and ogonek	Slavic dialectology, Old High German
Ę̈̀ ę̈̀	E with diaeresis, grave and ogonek	
Ę̈́ ę̈́	E with diaeresis, acute and ogonek	
Ę̈̂ ę̈̂	E with diaeresis, circumflex and ogonek	
Ę̈̌ ę̈̌	E with diaeresis, caron and ogonek	
Ę̈̄ ę̈̄	E with diaeresis, macron and ogonek	
Ę̋ ę̋	E with double acute and ogonek	
Ę̌ ę̌	E with caron and ogonek	
Ę̑ ę̑	E with inverted breve and ogonek	Old Church Slavonic transliteration
Ę̱ ę̱	E with ogonek and line below	
Ę̱̀ ę̱̀	E with ogonek, line below and grave	
Ę̱́ ę̱́	E with ogonek, line below and acute	
Ę̣ ę̣	E with ogonek and dot below	
Ę᷎ ę᷎	E with ogonek above and ogonek	
Ḙ ḙ	E with circumflex below	IPA and other phonetic systems, Semitic transliteration
Ḛ ḛ	E with tilde below	Ngambay, Zarma, !Xóõ, Semitic transliteration
E̱ e̱	E with line below	Germanic dialectology, Aguaruna, Rigwe
È̱ è̱	E with grave and line below	
É̱ é̱	E with acute and line below	
Ê̱ ê̱	E with circumflex and line below	
Ẽ̱ ẽ̱	E with tilde and line below	
Ē̱ ē̱	E with macron and line below	
Ḕ̱ ḕ̱	E with macron, grave and line below	
Ḗ̱ ḗ̱	E with macron, acute and line below	
Ē̱̂ ē̱̂	E with macron, circumflex and line below	
Ë̱ ë̱	E with diaeresis and line below	
Ë̱̀ ë̱̀	E with diaeresis, grave and line below	
Ë̱́ ë̱́	E with diaeresis, acute and line below	
Ë̱̂ ë̱̂	E with diaeresis, circumflex and line below	
Ë̱̌ ë̱̌	E with diaeresis, caron and line below	
Ě̱ ě̱	E with caron and line below	
E̮ e̮	E with breve below	Uralic dialectology
Ē̮ ē̮	E with breve below and macron	Uralic dialectology
Ẹ ẹ	E with dot below	Abua, Aramaic transliteration, Accented Slovenian, Gokana, Ibibio, Isoko, Okpela, Samogitian dialectology, Slavic dialectology, Urhobo, Vietnamese, Yaghnobi, Yakö, Yoruba
Ẹ̀ ẹ̀	E with grave and dot below	Aramaic transliteration, Greek dialectal transliteration
Ẹ́ ẹ́	E with acute and dot below	Aramaic transliteration, Greek dialectal transliteration, Yaghnobi, Accented Slovenian
Ệ ệ	E with circumflex and dot below	Vietnamese
Ẹ̃ ẹ̃	E with tilde and dot below	Samogitian dialectology
Ẹ̄ ẹ̄	E with macron and dot below	Aramaic transliteration, Greek dialectal transliteration, Proto-East Baltic transcription, Slavic dialectology
Ẹ̄̀ ẹ̄̀	E with macron, grave and dot below	Aramaic transliteration, Greek dialectal transliteration
Ẹ̄́ ẹ̄́	E with macron, acute and dot below	Aramaic transliteration, Greek dialectal transliteration, Proto-East Baltic transcription
Ẹ̄̃ ẹ̄̃	E with macron, tilde and dot below	Proto-East Baltic transcription
Ẹ̆ ẹ̆	E with breve and dot below	Romance dialectology, Croatian and Slovenian dialectology, Yaghnobi
Ẹ̆̀ ẹ̆̀	E with breve and grave and dot below	Croatian and Slovenian dialectology
Ẹ̆́ ẹ̆́	E with breve, acute and dot below	Yaghnobi, Croatian and Slovenian dialectology
Ẹ̈ ẹ̈	E with diaeresis and dot below	
Ẹ̈̀ ẹ̈̀	E with diaeresis, grave and dot below	
Ẹ̈́ ẹ̈́	E with diaeresis, acute and dot below	
Ẹ̈̂ ẹ̈̂	E with diaeresis, circumflex and dot below	
Ẹ̈̌ ẹ̈̌	E with diaeresis, caron and dot below	
Ẹ̍ ẹ̍	E with vertical line and dot below	
Ẹ̌ ẹ̌	E with caron and dot below	Sangir
Ẹ̑ ẹ̑	E with inverted breve and dot below	Accented Slovenian
E̤ e̤	E with diaeresis below	Pu-Xian Min
È̤ è̤	E with diaeresis below and grave	
É̤ é̤	E with diaeresis below and acute	
Ê̤ ê̤	E with diaeresis below and circumflex	
Ë̤ ë̤	E with diaeresis below and diaeresis	
E̥ e̥	E with ring below	Arabic transliteration, Pashto transliteration, Persian transliteration
E̯ e̯	E with inverted breve below	IPA and other phonetic alphabets
E̩ e̩	E with vertical line below	
È̩ è̩	E with vertical line below and grave	
É̩ é̩	E with vertical line below and acute	
Ê̩ ê̩	E with vertical line below and circumflex	
Ẽ̩ ẽ̩	E with vertical line below and tilde	
Ē̩ ē̩	E with vertical line below and macron	
Ě̩ ě̩	E with vertical line below and caron	
E̩̍ e̩̍	E with vertical line below and vertical line	
E̩̓ e̩̓	E with vertical line below and comma above	
È͕ è͕	E with right arrowhead below and grave	Uralic dialectology
Ê͕ ê͕	E with right arrowhead below and circumflex	Uralic dialectology
Ẽ͕ ẽ͕	E with right arrowhead below and tilde	Uralic dialectology
Ē͕ ē͕	E with right arrowhead below and macron	Uralic dialectology
Ḕ͕ ḕ͕	E with right arrowhead below, macron and grave	Uralic dialectology
E̜ e̜	E with left half ring below	
E̹ e̹	E with right half ring below	
È̹ è̹	E with right half ring below and grave	
É̹ é̹	E with right half ring below and acute	
Ê̹ ê̹	E with right half ring below and circumflex	
Ẽ̹ ẽ̹	E with right half ring below and tilde	
Ē̹ ē̹	E with right half ring below and macron	
Ḕ̹ ḕ̹	E with right half ring below, macron and grave	
Ɇ ɇ	E with stroke	Mazahua, Southeastern Tepehuan
ᶒ	E with retroflex hook	previously in IPA
ⱸ	E with notch	Swedish Dialect Alphabet
E̞ e̞	E with down tack below	Mid front unrounded vowel
ᶕ	Schwa with retroflex hook	previously in IPA
ᶓ	Open E with retroflex hook	previously in IPA
ɚ	Schwa with hook	IPA
ᶔ	Reversed open E with retroflex hook	previously in IPA
ɝ	Reversed open E with hook (Reversed Epsilon hook)	IPA
Ɛ̀ ɛ̀	Open E with grave	Nateni
Ɛ́ ɛ́	Open E with acute	Noni, Nzime, Sisaala
Ɛ̂ ɛ̂	Open E with circumflex	Nzime
Ɛ̃ ɛ̃	Open E with tilde	Ewe
Ɛ̃̀ ɛ̃̀	Open E with tilde and grave	
Ɛ̃́ ɛ̃́	Open E with tilde and acute	
Ɛ̃̂ ɛ̃̂	Open E with tilde and circumflex	
Ɛ̃̌ ɛ̃̌	Open E with tilde and caron	
Ɛ̃̍ ɛ̃̍	Open E with tilde and vertical line	
Ɛ̃̎ ɛ̃̎	Open E with tilde and double vertical line	
Ɛ̄ ɛ̄	Open E with macron	
Ɛ̆ ɛ̆	Open E with breve	
Ɛ̇ ɛ̇	Open E with dot above	
Ɛ̈ ɛ̈	Open E with diaeresis	
Ɛ̌ ɛ̌	Open E with caron	Nzime
Ɛ̍ ɛ̍	Open E with vertical line	
Ɛ̎ ɛ̎	Open E with double vertical line	
Ɛ̣ ɛ̣	Open E with dot below	George Herzog's Jabo transcription
Ɛ̣̀ ɛ̣̀	Open E with dot below and grave	
Ɛ̣́ ɛ̣́	Open E with dot below and acute	
Ɛ̣̂ ɛ̣̂	Open E with dot below and circumflex	
Ɛ̣̃ ɛ̣̃	Open E with dot below and tilde	
Ɛ̣̈ ɛ̣̈	Open E with dot below and diaeresis	
Ɛ̣̈̀ ɛ̣̈̀	Open E with dot below, diaeresis and grave	
Ɛ̣̈́ ɛ̣̈́	Open E with dot below, diaeresis and acute	
Ɛ̣̈̂ ɛ̣̈̂	Open E with dot below, diaeresis and circumflex	
Ɛ̣̈̌ ɛ̣̈̌	Open E with dot below, diaeresis and caron	
Ɛ̣̌ ɛ̣̌	Open E with dot below and caron	
Ɛ̤ ɛ̤	Open E with diaeresis below	
Ɛ̤̀ ɛ̤̀	Open E with diaeresis below and grave	
Ɛ̤́ ɛ̤́	Open E with diaeresis below and acute	
Ɛ̤̂ ɛ̤̂	Open E with diaeresis below and circumflex	
Ɛ̤̈ ɛ̤̈	Open E with diaeresis below and diaeresis	
Ɛ̧ ɛ̧	Open E with cedilla	
Ɛ̧̀ ɛ̧̀	Open E with cedilla and grave	
Ɛ̧́ ɛ̧́	Open E with cedilla and acute	
Ɛ̧̂ ɛ̧̂	Open E with cedilla and circumflex	
Ɛ̧̌ ɛ̧̌	Open E with cedilla and caron	
Ɛ̨ ɛ̨	Open E with ogonek	
Ɛ̨̀ ɛ̨̀	Open E with ogonek and grave	
Ɛ̨́ ɛ̨́	Open E with ogonek and acute	
Ɛ̨̂ ɛ̨̂	Open E with ogonek and circumflex	
Ɛ̨̄ ɛ̨̄	Open E with ogonek and macron	
Ɛ̨̆ ɛ̨̆	Open E with ogonek and breve	
Ɛ̨̈ ɛ̨̈	Open E with ogonek and diaeresis	
Ɛ̨̌ ɛ̨̌	Open E with ogonek and caron	
Ɛ̰ ɛ̰	Open E with tilde below	
Ɛ̰̀ ɛ̰̀	Open E with tilde below and grave	
Ɛ̰́ ɛ̰́	Open E with tilde below and acute	
Ɛ̰̄ ɛ̰̄	Open E with tilde below and macron	
Ɛ̱ ɛ̱	Open E with line below	
Ɛ̱̀ ɛ̱̀	Open E with line below and grave	
Ɛ̱́ ɛ̱́	Open E with line below and acute	
Ɛ̱̂ ɛ̱̂	Open E with line below and circumflex	
Ɛ̱̃ ɛ̱̃	Open E with line below and tilde	
Ɛ̱̈ ɛ̱̈	Open E with line below and diaeresis	
Ɛ̱̈̀ ɛ̱̈̀	Open E with line below, diaeresis and grave	
Ɛ̱̈́ ɛ̱̈́	Open E with line below, diaeresis and acute	
Ɛ̱̌ ɛ̱̌	Open E with line below and caron	
Ə̀ ə̀	Schwa with grave	Pinyin
Ə́ ə́	Schwa with acute	
Ə̂ ə̂	Schwa with circumflex	
Ə̄ ə̄	Schwa with macron	Avestan transliteration
Ə̌ ə̌	Schwa with caron	
Ə̏ ə̏	Schwa with double grave	Accented Slovenian
Ə̱ ə̱	Schwa with macron below	Idu Mishmi
Ə̱̃ ə̱̃	Schwa with macron below and tilde	Idu Mishmi
Ɤ́ ɤ́	Ram's horn with acute	Eastern Dan, Goo
Ɤ̂ ɤ̂	Ram's horn with circumflex	Eastern Dan, Goo
Ɤ̀ ɤ̀	Ram's horn with grave	Eastern Dan, Goo
Ɤ̋ ɤ̋	Ram's horn with double acute	Eastern Dan
Ɤ̏ ɤ̏	Ram's horn with double grave	Eastern Dan
Ɤ̄ ɤ̄	Ram's horn with macron	Eastern Dan
ɤ̞	Ram's horn with down tack below	Mid back unrounded vowel
F̀ f̀	F with grave	ISO 9
F́ f́	F with acute	Võro
F̃ f̃	F with tilde	Igbo (alternate orthography)
F̄ f̄	F with macron	ISO 11940, Thai transliteration
Ḟ ḟ	F with dot above	Irish (old orthography), Old High German, Old Russian transliteration
F̓ f̓	F with comma above	
F̧ f̧	F with cedilla	ALA-LC romanization of Abkhaz
ᵮ	F with middle tilde	
ᶂ	F with palatal hook	
Ƒ ƒ	F with hook (Script F)	Ewe
Ꞙ ꞙ	F with stroke	Archaic letter for Ewe
F̱ f̱	F with line below	
F̣ f̣	F with dot below	Georgian transliteration
ꜰ̇	Small capital F with dot above	
Ꝼ́ ꝼ́	Insular F with acute	
Ꝼ̇ ꝼ̇	Insular F with dot above	
Ꝼ̣ ꝼ̣	Insular F with dot below	
G̀ g̀	G with grave	ISO 9
Ǵ ǵ	G with acute	Kharosthi transliteration, Macedonian transliteration, Middle Persian Transliteration
Ǵ̄ ǵ̄	G with acute and macron	Kharosthi transliteration
Ĝ ĝ	G with circumflex	Aleut, Esperanto, Proto-Indo-European dialectology
G̃ g̃	G with tilde	Pre-1936 Tagalog letter; ng, Guaraní, Latin abbreviation, Sumerian transliteration
G̃́ g̃́	G with tilde and acute	
Ḡ ḡ	G with macron	Hebrew romanization, Kharosthi transliteration, Runic transliteration, Sindhi transliteration (Lepsius)
Ḡ́ ḡ́	G with macron and acute	Runic transliteration
Ğ ğ	G with breve	Turkish, Azerbaijani, Crimean Tatar, Laz, Bashkir transliteration
Ġ ġ	G with dot above	Iñupiat, Irish (old orthography), Maltese, Old High German
G̈ g̈	G with diaeresis	Nawdm, Sindhi transliteration
G̈̇ g̈̇	G with three dots above/diaeresis and dot above	Book Pahlavi transliteration
G̊ g̊	G with ring above	IPA
G̋ g̋	G with double acute	Old Hungarian
Ǧ ǧ	G with caron	Arabic transliteration, Berber, Lakota, Manichaean transliteration, Romani, Skolt Sámi
Ǧ̈ ǧ̈	G with caron and diaeresis	Manichaean transliteration
G̑ g̑	G with inverted breve	Aleut (alternative orthography), Glagolitic transliteration, Proto-Indo-European dialectology
G̒ g̒	G with turned comma above	
Gʻ gʻ	G with turned comma above right	Uzbek
G̓ g̓	G with comma above	
G̓́ g̓́	G with comma above and acute	Romance dialectology
G̕ g̕	G with comma above right	
G̔ g̔	G with reversed comma above	
Ģ ģ	G with cedilla	Latvian
G̦ g̦	G with comma below	Old Latgalian
G̱ g̱	G with line below	Hebrew romanization, Middle Persian transliteration, Sindhi transliteration
G̱̓ g̱̓	G with line below and comma above	
G̮ g̮	G with breve below	Romance dialectology
G̣ g̣	G with dot below	Eyak, Georgian transliteration
G̤ g̤	G with diaeresis below	
G̥ g̥	G with ring below	IPA and other phonetic alphabets
G̫ g̫	G with inverted double arch below	IPA
Ꞡ ꞡ	G with oblique stroke	Pre-1921 Latvian letter
Ǥ ǥ	G with stroke	Proto-Germanic transcription, Skolt Sámi
ᶃ	G with palatal hook	
Ɠ ɠ 𐞓	G with hook	Voiced velar implosive; Superscript form is an IPA superscript letter
ɢ̇	Small capital G with dot above	
ɢ̣	Small capital G with dot below	
ʛ 𐞔	Small capital G with hook	Voiced uvular implosive; Superscript form is an IPA superscript letter
Ɣ̓ ɣ̓	Gamma with comma above	Thompson
H̀ h̀	H with grave	Greek transliteration
H́ h́	H with acute	Avestan transliteration, Greek transliteration, Kharosthi transliteration, Võro, ALA-LC romanization
Ĥ ĥ	H with circumflex	Esperanto
H̄ h̄	H with macron	ISO 11940, Thai transliteration
Ḣ ḣ	H with dot above	Thai transliteration, Old High German
Ḧ ḧ	H with diaeresis	Kurdish
Ȟ ȟ	H with caron	Finnish Romani, Lakota
H̐ h̐	H with chandrabindu	ALA-LC romanization of Kabardian
H̓ h̓	H with comma above	Heiltsuk
H̕ h̕	H with comma above right	
Ḩ ḩ	H with cedilla	Arabic transliteration, Judeo-Tat
H̨ h̨	H with ogonek	Avestan transliteration
H̭ h̭	H with circumflex below	Demotic Egyptian transliteration
H̱ ẖ	H with line below	Arabic transliteration, Middle Persian transliteration, Sindhi transliteration
Ḫ ḫ	H with breve below	Arabic transliteration
Ḥ ḥ	H with dot below	Afro-Asiatic linguistics (including romanizations of Ancient Egyptian, Amazigh, Akkadian, Hebrew and Arabic), Sindhi transliteration
Ḥ̣ ḥ̣	H with colon below	Afro-Asiatic linguistics
H̤ h̤	H with diaeresis below	
H̥ h̥	H with ring below	IPA
H̬ h̬	H with caron below	IPA, Afro-Asiatic linguistics (including romanizations of Ancient Egyptian and Arabic)
H̯ h̯	H with inverted breve below	Indo-European dialectology
Ħ ħ ꟸ 𐞕	H with stroke	Voiceless pharyngeal fricative; Maltese; Superscript 𐞕 is an IPA superscript letter
Ħ̥ ħ̥	H with stroke and ring below	
Ɦ ɦ ʱ	H with hook	Voiced glottal fricative; Dagaare, Massa
Ⱨ ⱨ	H with descender	Uyghur. cf. Cyrillic: Ҙ ҙ
ꞕ	H with palatal hook	Lithuanian dialectology
h̢	H with retroflex hook	
𝼲	H with stroke and palatal hook	Obsolete IPA
ʜ̇	Small capital H with dot above	
ɧ 𐞗	Heng with hook	Voiceless palatal-velar fricative; Superscript form is an IPA superscript letter
Ì ì	I with grave	Emiliano-Romagnolo, Friulian, Italian, Luba-Kasai, Maltese, Nateni, Ndogo, Pinyin transliteration, Scottish Gaelic, Senoufo, Vietnamese, Welsh, Zurich German (some spellings)
Í í	I with acute	Afrikaans, Catalan, Czech, Danish, Dutch, Faroese, Galician, Hungarian Icelandic, Lingala, Lithuanian, Navajo, Ndogo, Ngiemboon, Nomaande, Ntcham, Nzime, Occitan, Pinyin transliteration, Portuguese, Slovak, Accented Slovenian, Spanish, Tatar, Vietnamese, Welsh, Yaghnobi
Î î	I with circumflex	Afrikaans, Emiliano-Romagnolo, French, Friulian, Italian, Kurdish, Accented Latvian, Romanian, Turkish, Welsh
Î́ î́	I with circumflex and acute	
Ĩ ĩ	I with tilde	Apalai, Bariba, Boko, Greenlandic, Guaraní, Kikuyu, Accented Latvian, Lithuanian, Nande, Umbundu, Vietnamese, Zarma
Ĩ́ ĩ́	I with tilde and acute	
Ĩ̀ ĩ̀	I with tilde and grave	
Ĩ̂ ĩ̂	I with tilde and circumflex	
Ĩ̌ ĩ̌	I with tilde and caron	
Ĩ̍ ĩ̍	I with tilde and vertical line	
Ĩ̎ ĩ̎	I with tilde and double vertical line	
Ī ī	I with macron	Arabic transliteration, Latvian, Latin, Māori, Ntcham, Nyakyusa, Sanskrit transliteration, Sindhi transliteration, Thai transliteration
Ī̀ ī̀	I with macron and grave	Sanskrit transliteration, Ancient Greek transliteration
Ī́ ī́	I with macron and acute	Sanskrit transliteration, Ancient Greek transliteration
Ī̂ ī̂	I with macron and circumflex	
Ī̌ ī̌	I with macron and caron	
Ī̃ ī̃	I with macron and tilde	Sanskrit transliteration
Ī̄ ī̄	I with macron and macron	Kienning Colloquial Romanized transliteration
Ī̆ ī̆	I with macron and breve	Latin
Ī̆́ ī̆́	I with macron, breve and acute	
Ĭ ĭ	I with breve	Jarai, Latin, Yaghnobi; Previously used in Romanian
Ĭ̀ ĭ̀	I with breve and grave	
Ĭ́ ĭ́	I with breve and acute	Yaghnobi
İ i	I (uppercase) with dot above	Turkish, Azerbaijani, Old High German
I ı	I (lowercase, i.e. ı) without dot above	Turkish, Azerbaijani, Old High German, Old Icelandic (in the First Grammatical Treatise)
İ́ i̇́	I with dot above and acute	
Ï ï	I with diaeresis	Afrikaans, Catalan, Dutch, French, Glagolitic transliteration, Greek transliteration, Italian, Welsh
Ï̀ ï̀	I with diaeresis and grave	Greek transliteration
Ḯ ḯ	I with diaeresis and acute	Greek transliteration
Ï̂ ï̂	I with diaeresis and circumflex	
Ï̃ ï̃	I with diaeresis and tilde	
Ï̄ ï̄	I with diaeresis and macron	
Ï̌ ï̌	I with diaeresis and caron	
Ï̑ ï̑	I with diaeresis and inverted breve	Glagolitic transliteration
I̊ i̊	I with ring above	Old High German
I̋ i̋	I with double acute	Old High German
Ǐ ǐ	I with caron	Pinyin
Ỉ ỉ	I with hook above	Vietnamese
I̍ i̍	I with vertical line	Pe̍h-oē-jī, Taiwanese Romanization System and other romanizations of Chinese dialects
I̎ i̎	I with double vertical line	
Ȉ ȉ	I with double grave	Croatian, Accented Slovenian
I̐ i̐	I with chandrabindu	ALA-LC Romanization
Ȋ ȋ	I with inverted breve	Croatian, Glagolitic transliteration, Accented Slovenian
I᷎ i᷎	I with ogonek above	
Į į	I with ogonek	Lithuanian, Navajo
Į̀ į̀	I with ogonek and grave	Tlicho
Į́ į́ į̇́	I with ogonek and acute	Lithuanian, Navajo
Į̂ į̂	I with ogonek and circumflex	
Į̃ į̃ į̇̃	I with ogonek and tilde	Lithuanian
Į̄ į̄	I with ogonek and macron	Proto-Germanic transcription
Į̄̀ į̄̀	I with ogonek, macron, and grave	
Į̄́ į̄́	I with ogonek, macron and acute	
Į̄̂ į̄̂	I with ogonek, macron and circumflex	
Į̄̆ į̄̆	I with ogonek, macron and breve	North Germanic dialectology
Į̄̌ į̄̌	I with ogonek, macron and caron	
Į̈ į̈	I with ogonek and diaeresis	
Į̈̀ į̈̀	I with ogonek, diaeresis and grave	
Į̈́ į̈́	I with ogonek, diaeresis and acute	
Į̈̂ į̈̂	I with ogonek, diaeresis and circumflex	
Į̈̌ į̈̌	I with ogonek, diaeresis and caron	
Į̈̄ į̈̄	I with ogonek, diaeresis and macron	
Į̋ į̋	I with ogonek and double acute	
Į̌ į̌	I with ogonek and caron	
Į̱ į̱	I with ogonek and line below	
Į̱̀ į̱̀	I with ogonek, line below and grave	
Į̱́ į̱́	I with ogonek, line below and acute	
I̓ i̓	I with comma above	Heiltsuk
I̧ i̧	I with cedilla	
Ì̧ ì̧	I with cedilla and grave	
Í̧ í̧	I with cedilla and acute	
Î̧ î̧	I with cedilla and circumflex	
I̭ i̭	I with circumflex below	Cuneiform transliteration
Ī̭ ī̭	I with circumflex below and macron	Cuneiform transliteration
Ḭ ḭ	I with tilde below	IPA, Semitic transliteration
Ḭ̀ ḭ̀	I with tilde below and grave	
Ḭ́ ḭ́	I with tilde below and acute	Nateni
Ḭ̄ ḭ̄	I with tilde below and macron	
Ḭ̈ ḭ̈	I with tilde below and diaeresis	
Ḭ̈́ ḭ̈́	I with tilde below, diaeresis and acute	
I̱ i̱	I with line below	Germanic dialectology, Aguaruna
Ì̱ ì̱	I with line below and grave	
Í̱ í̱	I with line below and acute	
Î̱ î̱	I with line below and circumflex	
Ǐ̱ ǐ̱	I with line below and caron	
Ĩ̱ ĩ̱	I with line below and tilde	
Ï̱ ï̱	I with line below and diaeresis	
Ï̱̀ ï̱̀	I with line below, diaeresis and grave	
Ḯ̱ ḯ̱	I with line below, diaeresis and acute	
Ï̱̂ ï̱̂	I with line below, diaeresis and circumflex	
Ï̱̌ ï̱̌	I with line below, diaeresis and caron	
Ī̱ ī̱	I with line below and macron	
Ī̱́ ī̱́	I with line below, macron and acute	
Ī̱̀ ī̱̀	I with line below, macron and grave	
Ī̱̂ ī̱̂	I with line below, macron and circumflex	
I̮ i̮	I with breve below	Uralic dialectology
Ị ị	I with dot below	Igbo, Nyakyusa, Vietnamese, Thai transliteration
Ị̀ ị̀	I with dot below and grave	
Ị́ ị́	I with dot below and acute	
Ị̂ ị̂	I with dot below and circumflex	
Ị̃ ị̃	I with dot below and tilde	
Ị̄ ị̄	I with dot below and macron	Romance dialectology
Ị̈ ị̈	I with dot below and diaeresis	
Ị̈̀ ị̈̀	I with dot below, diaeresis and grave	
Ị̈́ ị̈́	I with dot below, diaeresis and acute	
Ị̈̂ ị̈̂	I with dot below, diaeresis and circumflex	
Ị̈̌ ị̈̌	I with dot below, diaeresis and caron	
Ị̌ ị̌	I with dot below and caron	
Ị̍ ị̍	I with dot below and vertical line	
I̤ i̤	I with diaeresis below	
Ì̤ ì̤	I with diaeresis below and grave	
Í̤ í̤	I with diaeresis below and acute	
Î̤ î̤	I with diaeresis below and circumflex	
Ï̤ ï̤	I with diaeresis below and diaeresis	
I̥ i̥	I with ring below	IPA (devoiced vowel), Yaghnobi
Í̥ í̥	I with ring below and acute	Yaghnobi
Ï̥ ï̥	I with ring below and diaeresis	
I̯ i̯	I with inverted breve below	IPA, Proto-Indo-European transcription, Uralic dialectology
Í̯ í̯	I with inverted breve below and acute	Uralic dialectology
Ĩ̯ ĩ̯	I with inverted breve below and tilde	Proto-Indo-European transcription
I̩ i̩	I with vertical line below	
I͔ i͔	I with left arrowhead below	Uralic dialectology
Ī͔ ī͔	I with left arrowhead below and macron	Uralic dialectology
Ɨ ɨ ᶤ	I with stroke	Close central unrounded vowel; General Alphabet of Cameroon languages, Thai transliteration
Ɨ̀ ɨ̀	I with stroke and grave	Pinyin
Ɨ́ ɨ́	I with stroke and acute	Nzime
Ɨ̂ ɨ̂	I with stroke and circumflex	
Ɨ̌ ɨ̌	I with stroke and caron	
Ɨ̃ ɨ̃	I with stroke and tilde	
Ɨ̄ ɨ̄	I with stroke and macron	
Ɨ̈ ɨ̈	I with stroke and diaeresis	
Ɨ̧ ɨ̧	I with stroke and cedilla	
Ɨ̧̀ ɨ̧̀	I with stroke, cedilla and grave	
Ɨ̧̂ ɨ̧̂	I with stroke, cedilla and circumflex	
Ɨ̧̌ ɨ̧̌	I with stroke, cedilla and caron	
Ɨ̱ ɨ̱	I with stroke and line below	
Ɨ̱̀ ɨ̱̀	I with stroke, line below and grave	
Ɨ̱́ ɨ̱́	I with stroke, line below and acute	
Ɨ̱̂ ɨ̱̂	I with stroke, line below and circumflex	
Ɨ̱̈ ɨ̱̈	I with stroke, line below and diaeresis	
Ɨ̱̌ ɨ̱̌	I with stroke, line below and caron	
Ɨ̯ ɨ̯	I with stroke and inverted breve below	
𝼚	I with stroke and retroflex hook	Used in phonetic transcription
ᶖ	I with retroflex hook	
Ꞽ ꞽ	Glottal I	Egyptological yod
ı̣	Dotless I with dot below	Slavic dialectology
ı̥	Dotless I with ring below	
Ɩ̀ ɩ̀	Iota with grave	Dagaare, Goo, Guro, Nuni, Puguli, Tafi, Tura
Ɩ́ ɩ́	Iota with acute	Nkonya, Sisaala
Ɩ᷇ ɩ᷇	Iota with acute-macron	
Ɩ̂ ɩ̂	Iota with circumflex	Anii, Goo, Guro, Tafi, Tura
Ɩ̃ ɩ̃	Iota with tilde	Dagaare, Dogose, Kaansa, Puguli, Tafi,
Ɩ̃̀ ɩ̃̀	Iota with tilde and grave	
Ɩ̃́ ɩ̃́	Iota with tilde and acute	
Ɩ̃̂ ɩ̃̂	Iota with tilde and circumflex	
Ɩ̃̌ ɩ̃̌	Iota with tilde and caron	
Ɩ̃̄ ɩ̃̄	Iota with tilde and macron	
Ɩ̃᷇ ɩ̃᷇	Iota with tilde and acute-macron	
Ɩ̈ ɩ̈	Iota with diaeresis	Americanist phonetic notation
Ɩ̇ ɩ̇	Iota with dot	Americanist phonetic notation
Ɩ̌ ɩ̌	Iota with caron	Guro
ᵼ	Iota with stroke	
J́ j́	J with acute	ISO 9, Kharosthi transliteration
Ĵ ĵ	J with circumflex	Esperanto
J̃ j̃ j̇̃	J with tilde	Lithuanian, Sindhi transliteration
J̄ j̄	J with macron	Kharosthi transliteration, Sindhi transliteration (Lepsius)
J̇	J with dot above	Old High German
J̈ j̈	J with diaeresis	Sindhi transliteration
J̈̇ j̈̇	J with three dots above/diaeresis and dot above	Book Pahlavi transliteration
J̊ j̊	J with ring above	Old High German
J̋ j̋	J with double acute	
J̌ ǰ	J with caron	Wakhi, Uralic linguistics
J̌́ ǰ́	J with caron and acute	Uralic linguistics
J̑ j̑	J with inverted breve	Glagolitic transliteration
J̓ j̓	J with comma above	
J᷎ j᷎	J with ogonek above	
J̱ j̱	J with line below	Sindhi transliteration
J̣ j̣	J with dot below	Inari Sami, Old High German, Shina
J̣̌ ǰ̣	J with dot below and caron	Wakhi
J̥ j̥	J with ring below	IPA and other phonetic alphabets
Ɉ ɉ	J with stroke	Arhuaco
Ɉ̱ ɉ̱	J with stroke and line below	
Ʝ ʝ ᶨ	J with crossed-tail	Voiced palatal fricative
ɟ ᶡ	Dotless J with stroke	Voiced palatal plosive
ʄ 𐞘	Dotless J with stroke and hook	Voiced palatal implosive; Superscript form is an IPA superscript letter
K̀ k̀	K with grave	Greek transliteration, ISO 9
Ḱ ḱ	K with acute	Macedonian transliteration, Greek transliteration, Saanich, ISO 9
K̂ k̂	K with circumflex	Carian transliteration, Proto-Indo-Iranian dialectology
K̃ k̃	K with tilde	Transliterations (used for IPA /x/), Old Norse abbreviation, Babm
K̄ k̄	K with macron	ISO 9, Thai transliteration
K̆ k̆	K with breve	Uralic dialectology, Laz, Thai transliteration
K̇ k̇	K with dot above	Old High German; ALA-LC romanizations
K̈ k̈	K with diaeresis	Manichaean transliteration
Ǩ ǩ	K with caron	Skolt Sámi, Laz
K̑ k̑	K with inverted breve	Proto-Indo-European dialectology, Glagolitic transliteration
K̓ k̓	K with comma above	Comox, Greek transliteration, Nuxalk
K̕ k̕	K with comma above right	
K̔ k̔	K with reversed comma above	
K͑ k͑	K with left half ring above	Armenian transliteration
Ķ ķ	K with cedilla	Latvian
K̦ k̦	K with comma below	Old Latgalian
K̨ k̨	K with ogonek	Uralic dialectology
Ḵ ḵ	K with line below	Hebrew romanization, Middle Persian transliteration, Sindhi transliteration
Ḵ̓ ḵ̓	K with line below and comma above	
Ḳ ḳ	K with dot below	Urdu transliteration, Georgian transliteration, ALA-LC and DIN 31636 Hebrew romanization (written as q in the main romanization), Thai transliteration
K̮ k̮	K with breve below	Romance dialectology
K̥ k̥	K with ring below	
K̬ k̬	K with caron below	IPA and other phonetic alphabets
K̫ k̫	K with inverted double arch below	IPA and other phonetic alphabets
ᶄ	K with palatal hook	
Ƙ ƙ	K with hook	Obsolete symbol for voiceless velar implosive, Hausa, Karai-karai
Ⱪ ⱪ	K with descender	Azerbaijani (some dialects), Uyghur. cf. Cyrillic: Қ қ
Ꝁ ꝁ	K with stroke	Medieval abbreviations
Ꝃ ꝃ	K with diagonal stroke	Medieval abbreviations
Ꝅ ꝅ	K with stroke and diagonal stroke	Medieval abbreviations
Ꞣ ꞣ	K with oblique stroke	Pre-1921 Latvian letter
ᴋ̇	Small capital K with dot above	
Ŀ ŀ	L with middle dot	Catalan
𝼦	L with mid-height left hook	Used by the British and Foreign Bible Society in the early 20th century for romanization of the Malayalam language.
L̀ l̀	L with grave	Ntcham
Ĺ ĺ	L with acute	Slovak, Ntcham
L̂ l̂	L with circumflex	Accented Latvian, ISO 9
L̃ l̃	L with tilde	Accented Latvian, Lithuanian
L̄ l̄	L with macron	Basque (alternative orthography)
L̇ l̇	L with dot above	Old High German; Previously used in Czech
L̈ l̈	L with diaeresis	
L̋ l̋	L with double acute	
Ľ ľ	L with caron	Romani, Slovak
L̐ l̐	L with chandrabindu	Sanskrit transliteration
L̑ l̑	L with inverted breve	Glagolitic transliteration
L̓ l̓	L with comma above	Comox, Heiltsuk, Thompson
L̕ l̕	L with comma above right	
Ļ ļ	L with cedilla	Latvian, Marshallese
Ļ̂ ļ̂	L with cedilla and circumflex	Accented Latvian
Ļ̃ ļ̃	L with cedilla and tilde	Accented Latvian
L̦ l̦	L with comma below	Nenets in the 1930s, Old Latgalian
Ḽ ḽ	L with circumflex below	Venda
Ḻ ḻ	L with line below	Middle Persian transliteration, Tamil transliteration
Ḻ̓ ḻ̓	L with comma above and line below	
L̮ l̮	L with breve below	Romance dialectology
Ḷ ḷ	L with dot below	Bengali transliteration, Inari Sami, Iñupiat, Proto-Indo-European transcription, Sanskrit transliteration, Thai transliteration
Ḷ̀ ḷ̀	L with grave and dot below	Proto-Indo-European transcription, Sanskrit transliteration
Ḷ́ ḷ́	L with acute and dot below	Proto-Indo-European transcription, Sanskrit transliteration
Ḹ ḹ	L with dot below and macron	Proto-Indo-European transcription, Sanskrit transliteration
Ḹ́ ḹ́	L with dot below and macron and acute	Proto-Indo-European transcription, Sanskrit transliteration
Ḹ̆ ḹ̆	L with dot below and macron and breve	Sanskrit transliteration
Ḷ̓ ḷ̓	L with comma above and dot below	
Ḷ̕ ḷ̕	L with comma above right and dot below	
Ḷ̣ ḷ̣	L with colon below	Arabic romanization, Indic linguistics (incl. romanizations of Punjabi)
L̤ l̤	L with diaeresis below	Bengali, Kannada, Tamil, and Malayalam transliteration
L̤̄ l̤̄	L with diaeresis below and macron	Bengali transliteration
L̥ l̥	L with ring below	Proto-Indo-European transcription, Sanskrit transliteration
L̥̀ l̥̀	L with ring below and grave	Proto-Indo-European transcription, Sanskrit transliteration
Ĺ̥ ĺ̥	L with ring below and acute	Proto-Indo-European transcription, Sanskrit transliteration
L̥̄ l̥̄	L with ring below and macron	Proto-Indo-European transcription, Sanskrit transliteration
L̥̄́ l̥̄́	L with ring below, macron and acute	Proto-Indo-European transcription, Sanskrit transliteration
L̥̄̆ l̥̄̆	L with ring below, macron and breve	Proto-Indo-European transcription
L̥̕ l̥̕	L with ring below and caron	Sanskrit transliteration
L̩ l̩	L with vertical line below	IPA and other phonetic alphabets
L̩̀ l̩̀	L with vertical line below and grave	
L̩̓ l̩̓	L with vertical line below and comma above	
L̯ l̯	L with inverted breve below	IPA and other phonetic alphabets
Ł ł	L with stroke	Gwich'in, Iñupiat, Kashubian, Navajo, Nuxalk, Polish, Salish, Silesian, accented Slovenian, Sorbian, Venetian, Thai transliteration
Ł̇ ł̇	L with stroke and dot above	
Ł̓ ł̓	L with stroke and comma above	
Ł̣ ł̣	L with stroke and dot below	Iñupiat
Ł̱ ł̱	L with stroke and line below	
Ꝉ ꝉ	L with high stroke	Medieval abbreviations
Ƚ ƚ	L with bar	Saanich
Ⱡ ⱡ	L with double bar	Melpa
Ɫ ɫ ꭞ	L with middle tilde	Velarized alveolar lateral approximant, Teuthonista phonetic transcription system for German dialectology
Ɬ ɬ 𐞛	L with belt	Comox, Voiceless alveolar lateral fricative; Superscript form is an IPA superscript letter
𝼓	L with belt and palatal hook	Used in phonetic transcription
𝼑	L with fishhook	Used in phonetic transcription
ᶅ ᶪ	L with palatal hook	
ɭ ᶩ	L with retroflex hook	Retroflex lateral approximant
ꞎ 𐞝	L with retroflex hook and belt	Voiceless retroflex lateral fricative in Toda; Superscript form is part of the Extensions to the International Phonetic Alphabet for disordered speech (extIPA)
ȴ	L with curl	Alveolo-palatal lateral approximant
ʟ̇	Small capital L with dot above	
ʟ̣	Small capital L with dot below	
𝼄 𐞜	Small capital L with belt	ExtIPA (unvoiced lateral fricative); Superscript form is an IPA superscript letter
Ƛ ƛ	Lambda with stroke	Salishan and Wakashan languages, Americanist phonetic notation
ƛ̓	Lambda with stroke and comma above	Used for many of the Salish languages, such as Klallam, for an ejective lateral affricate
M̀ m̀	M with grave	Doo, Gokana, Kikongo, Old Italian, Tarok, Yoruba, Pinyin transliteration and other transliterations of Chinese dialects
Ḿ ḿ	M with acute	Dii, Gokana, Makari, Tarok, Võro, Yoruba, Yupik, Pinyin transliteration and other transliterations of Chinese dialects; previously used in Sorbian
M̂ m̂	M with circumflex	Latvian lexicographic tonal notation, obsolete Luxembourgish spelling, Old High German, Pe̍h-ōe-jī, Taiwanese Romanization System and other transliterations of Chinese dialects
M̃ m̃	M with tilde	Accented Latvian, Lithuanian, Lycian transliteration, Old Irish
M̄ m̄	M with macron	Kharosthi transliteration, Pe̍h-ōe-jī, Taiwanese Romanization System and other transliterations of Chinese dialects
M̆ m̆	M with breve	Sinhala transliteration
Ṁ ṁ	M with dot above	Irish (old orthography), Old High German, Sanskrit transliteration
Ṁ̇ ṁ̇	M with colon above	Sanskrit transliteration
M̈ m̈	M with diaeresis	Araki, Old German
M̋ m̋	M with double acute	
M̍ m̍	M with vertical line	Pe̍h-ōe-jī, Taiwanese Romanization System and other transliterations of Chinese dialects.
M̌ m̌	M with caron	Tarok, Wenzhounese Romanization System and other transliterations of Chinese dialects.
M̐ m̐	M with chandrabindu	Sanskrit transliteration
M̑ m̑	M with inverted breve	Glagolitic transliteration
M̓ m̓	M with comma above	Comox
M̕̕ m̕	M with comma above right	
M͑ m͑	M with left half ring above	Armenian transliteration
ᵯ	M with middle tilde	
M̧ m̧	M with cedilla	Marshallese
M̨ m̨	M with ogonek	Avestan transliteration, Uralic dialectology
M̦ m̦	M with comma below	Nenets in the 1930s
M̱ m̱	M with line below	Middle Persian transliteration, Telugu transliteration
Ḿ̱ ḿ̱	M with line below and acute	Telugu transliteration
M̮ m̮	M with breve below	Romance dialectology
Ṃ ṃ	M with dot below	Inari Sami, Sanskrit transliteration, Thaana transliteration
Ṃ́ ṃ́	M with acute and dot below	Thaana transliteration
Ṃ̄ ṃ̄	M with macron and dot below	Thaana transliteration
Ṃ̓ ṃ̓	M with comma above and dot below	
M̥ m̥	M with ring below	Proto-Indo-European transcription, Sanskrit transliteration
Ḿ̥ ḿ̥	M with ring below and acute	Proto-Indo-European transcription, Sanskrit transliteration
M̥̄ m̥̄	M with ring below and macron	Proto-Indo-European transcription, Sanskrit transliteration
M̥̄́ m̥̄́	M with ring below, macron and acute	Proto-Indo-European transcription, Sanskrit transliteration
M̥̄̆ m̥̄̆	M with ring below, macron and breve	Proto-Indo-European transcription
M̬ m̬	M with caron below	Uralic dialectology
M̩ m̩	M with vertical line below	IPA and other phonetic alphabets
M̩̀ m̩̀	M with vertical line below and grave	
M̩̓ m̩̓	M with vertical line below and comma above	
M̯ m̯	M with inverted breve below	IPA and other phonetic alphabets
ᶆ	M with palatal hook	
m̢	M with retroflex hook	
Ɱ ɱ ᶬ	M with hook	Labiodental nasal
ᴍ̇	Small capital M with dot above	
ᴍ̣	Small capital M with dot below	
Ǹ ǹ	N with grave	Dii, Kikongo, Nateni, Old Italian, Pe̍h-ōe-jī, Tarok, Taiwanese Romanization System and other transliterations of Chinese dialects
Ń ń	N with acute	Nateni, Ngangam, Nuni, Polish, Kashubian, Lule Sámi, Pe̍h-ōe-jī, Sorbian, Tarok, Taiwanese Romanization System and other transliterations of Chinese dialects
N̂ n̂	N with circumflex	Chiricahua, Accented Latvian, obsolete Luxembourgish spelling, Massa, ISO 9, Old High German, Pe̍h-ōe-jī, Taiwanese Romanization System and other transliterations of Chinese dialects
Ñ ñ	N with tilde	Aragonese, Asturian, Basque, Breton, Catalan, Galician, Guaraní, Hassaniya, Iñupiat, Jarai, Accented Latvian, Lithuanian, Ocaina, Quechua, Sanskrit transliteration, Spanish, Sindhi transliteration, Tagalog, Wolof
Ñ̈ ñ̈	N with tilde and diaeresis	Ocaina
N̄ n̄	N with macron	Basque (alternative orthography), Kharosthi transliteration, Obolo, Pe̍h-ōe-jī, Taiwanese Romanization System and other transliterations of Chinese dialects
N̆ n̆	N with breve	Sinhala transliteration
Ṅ ṅ	N with dot above	Emiliano-Romagnolo, Sanskrit transliteration, Sindhi transliteration, Venda
Ṅ̇ ṅ̇	N with colon above	Sanskrit transliteration
N̈ n̈	N with diaeresis	Cape Verdan Creole, Jacaltec, Malagasy, Ocaina, Old German, Old Hungarian
N̋ n̋	N with double acute	Eastern Dan, Old Hungarian
N̏ n̏	N with double grave	Eastern Dan
Ň ň	N with caron	Czech, Slovak, Tarok, Turkmen, Ithkuil transliteration, Wenzhounese Romanization System and other transliterations of Chinese dialects.
N̐ n̐	N with chandrabindu	Sanskrit transliteration
N̑ n̑	N with inverted breve	Glagolitic transliteration
N̍ n̍	N with vertical line	Pe̍h-ōe-jī, Taiwanese Romanization System and other transliterations of Chinese dialects.
N̓ n̓	N with comma above	Comox
N̕ n̕	N with comma above right	
Ꞥ ꞥ	N with oblique stroke	Pre-1921 Latvian letter
ᵰ	N with middle tilde	
𝼧	N with mid-height left hook	Used by the British and Foreign Bible Society in the early 20th century for romanization of the Malayalam language.
Ņ ņ	N with cedilla	Latvian
Ņ̂ ņ̂	N with cedilla and circumflex	Accented Latvian
Ņ̃ ņ̃	N with cedilla and tilde	Accented Latvian
N̦ n̦	N with comma below	Old Latgalian, Nenets in the 1930s
N̨ n̨	N with ogonek	Avestan transliteration, Uralic dialectology; Tuvan transliteration (alternate form of N with descender)
Ṋ ṋ	N with circumflex below	Venda
N̰ n̰	N with tilde below	
Ṉ ṉ	N with line below	Tamil transliteration, Telugu transliteration
Ṉ́ ṉ́	N with line below and acute	Telugu transliteration
N̮ n̮	N with breve below	Romance dialectology
Ṇ ṇ	N with dot below	Inari Sami, Sanskrit transliteration, Sindhi transliteration, Thaana transliteration, Thai transliteration
Ṇ́ ṇ́	N with acute and dot below	Thaana transliteration
Ṇ̄ ṇ̄	N with macron and dot below	Thaana transliteration
Ṇ̄́ ṇ̄́	N with macron, acute and dot below	Thaana transliteration
Ṇ̓ ṇ̓	N with comma above and dot below	
N̤ n̤	N with diaeresis below	Arabic transliteration, Sindhi transliteration, Tamil transliteration
N̥ n̥	N with ring below	Proto-Indo-European transcription, Sanskrit transliteration, Arabic transliteration
Ǹ̥ ǹ̥	N with ring below and grave	Sanskrit transliteration
Ń̥ ń̥	N with ring below and acute	Proto-Indo-European transcription, Sanskrit transliteration
Ñ̥ ñ̥	N with ring below and tilde	Sanskrit transliteration
Ñ̥́ ñ̥́	N with ring below and tilde and acute	Sanskrit transliteration
N̥̄ n̥̄	N with ring below and macron	Proto-Indo-European transcription, Sanskrit transliteration
N̥̄́ n̥̄́	N with ring below and macron and acute	Proto-Indo-European transcription, Sanskrit transliteration
N̥̄̆ n̥̄̆	N with ring below and macron and breve	Proto-Indo-European transcription
N̥̄̑ n̥̄̑	N with ring below and macron and inverted breve	Proto-Indo-European transcription
Ṅ̥ ṅ̥	N with ring below and dot above	Sanskrit transliteration
N̥̑ n̥̑	N with ring below and inverted breve	Proto-Indo-European transcription
N̥̑́ n̥̑́	N with ring below and inverted breve and acute	Proto-Indo-European transcription
N̥̑̄ n̥̑̄	N with ring below and inverted breve and macron	Proto-Indo-European transcription
N̯ n̯	N with inverted breve below	IPA and other phonetic alphabets
N̩ n̩	N with vertical line below	IPA and other phonetic alphabets
Ǹ̩ ǹ̩	N with vertical line below and grave	
N̩̓ n̩̓	N with vertical line below and comma above	
N̲ n̲	N with underline	
Ɲ ɲ ᶮ	N with left hook	Palatal nasal; Bambara and other African languages
Ƞ ƞ	N with long right leg	Lakota
Ꞑ ꞑ	N with descender	Jaꞑalif; Tuvan transliteration
N̪ n̪	N with bridge below	Voiced dental nasal
Ŋ̀ ŋ̀	Eng with grave	
Ŋ́ ŋ́	Eng with acute	Avestan transliteration
Ŋ̂ ŋ̂	Eng with circumflex	Old High German
Ŋ̄ ŋ̄	Eng with macron	
Ŋ̈ ŋ̈	Eng with diaeresis	
Ŋ̈̇ ŋ̈̇	Eng with diaeresis and dot above (three dots above)	Book Pahlavi transliteration
Ŋ̊ ŋ̊	Eng with ring above	IPA and other phonetic alphabets
Ŋ̑ ŋ̑	Eng with inverted breve	Glagolitic transliteration
Ŋ̨ ŋ̨	Eng with ogonek	Uralic dialectology
Ŋ̣ ŋ̣	Eng with dot below	Inari Sami
Ŋ̥ ŋ̥	Eng with ring below	Proto-Indo-European transcription
Ŋ̥́ ŋ̥́	Eng with ring below and acute	Proto-Indo-European transcription
Ŋ̥̄ ŋ̥̄	Eng with ring below and macron	Proto-Indo-European transcription
Ŋ̥̄́ ŋ̥̄́	Eng with ring below and macron and acute	Proto-Indo-European transcription
ᶇ	N with palatal hook	
ɳ ᶯ	N with retroflex hook	Retroflex nasal
ȵ	N with curl	Alveolo-palatal nasal
ɴ̇	Small capital N with dot above	
ɴ̣	Small capital N with dot below	
Ò ò	O with grave	Catalan, Emiliano-Romagnolo, Friulian, Italian, Kashubian, Maltese, Norwegian, Obolo, Occitan, Old Sámi orthography, Pinyin transliteration, Pe̍h-ōe-jī, Scottish Gaelic, Welsh, Zurich German (some spellings), Taiwanese Romanization System and other transliterations of Chinese dialects
Ó ó	O with acute	Catalan, Czech, Danish, Dutch, Emiliano-Romagnolo, Hungarian, Italian, Kashubian, Lombard, Nateni, Nangam, Ngiemboon, Norwegian, Nzime, Occitan, Polish, Pinyin transliteration, Pe̍h-ōe-jī, Portuguese, Scottish Gaelic, Slovak, Accented Slovenian, Spanish, Welsh, Taiwanese Romanization System and other transliterations of Chinese dialects
Ô ô	O with circumflex	Emiliano-Romagnolo, Friulian, French, Jarai, Kashubian, Norwegian, Pinyin, Portuguese, Slovak, Vietnamese, Welsh, Pe̍h-ōe-jī, Taiwanese Romanization System and other transliterations of Chinese dialects
Ố ố	O with circumflex and acute	Vietnamese
Ồ ồ	O with circumflex and grave	Vietnamese
Ỗ ỗ	O with circumflex and tilde	Vietnamese
Ô̆ ô̆	O with circumflex and breve	Jarai
Ổ ổ	O with circumflex and hook above	Vietnamese
Õ õ	O with tilde	Estonian, Frafra Portuguese, Vietnamese, Võro
Õ̍ õ̍	O with tilde and vertical line	
Õ̎ õ̎	O with tilde and double vertical line	
Õ̀ õ̀	O with tilde and grave	
Ṍ ṍ	O with tilde and acute	Lao transliteration
Õ̂ õ̂	O with tilde and circumflex	
Õ̌ õ̌	O with tilde and caron	
Ṏ ṏ	O with tilde and diaeresis	Tunisian Arabic transliteration
Ȭ ȭ	O with tilde and macron	Livonian
Ō ō	O with macron	Glagolitic transliteration, Greek transliteration, Latgalian, Latin, Livonian, Māori, Pre-1946 Latvian letter, still sometimes used in some non-standard orthographies, Old Sámi orthography, Pali transliteration, Proto-Indo-European transcription
Ṓ ṓ	O with macron and acute	Ancient Greek transliteration, Pali transliteration, Proto-Indo-European transcription
Ṑ ṑ	O with macron and grave	Ancient Greek transliteration, Livonian, Pali transliteration, Proto-Indo-European transcription
Ō̂ ō̂	O with macron and circumflex	
Ō̃ ō̃	O with macron and tilde	Pali transliteration, Proto-Indo-European transcription
Ō̃́ ō̃́	O with macron and tilde and acute	Proto-Indo-European transcription
Ō̄ ō̄	O with macron and macron	Kienning Colloquial Romanized transliteration
Ō̆ ō̆	O with macron and breve	Latin
Ō̆́ ō̆́	O with macron, breve and acute	
Ō̈ ō̈	O with macron and diaeresis	Svan transliteration
Ō̋ ō̋	O with macron and double acute	Proto-Slavic transcription
Ō̌ ō̌	O with macron and caron	Indo-Iranian dialectology
Ŏ ŏ	O with breve	Foochow Romanized, Jarai, Khmer transliteration, Latin
Ŏ̀ ŏ̀	O with breve and grave	
Ŏ́ ŏ́	O with breve and acute	
Ŏ̈ ŏ̈	O with breve and diaeresis	Khmer transliteration
Ȯ ȯ	O with dot above	Livonian, Ulithian
Ȯ́ ȯ́	O with dot above and acute	
Ȱ ȱ	O with dot above and macron	Livonian
O͘ o͘	O with dot above right	Pe̍h-ōe-jī
Ó͘ ó͘	O with dot above right and acute	Pe̍h-ōe-jī
Ò͘ ò͘	O with dot above right and grave	Pe̍h-ōe-jī
Ō͘ ō͘	O with dot above right and macron	Pe̍h-ōe-jī
O̍͘ o̍͘	O with dot above and vertical line	Pe̍h-ōe-jī
Ö ö	O with diaeresis	Azerbaijani, Dutch, Emiliano-Romagnolo, Estonian, Finnish, German, Hungarian, Luxembourgish, North Frisian, Norwegian, Rotuman, Sami, Saterlandic, Slovak, Tatar, Turkish, Turkmen, Welsh; cf. Cyrillic: Ӧ ӧ
Ö́ ö́	O with diaeresis and acute	Middle Low German, Old Hungarian(now spelled Ő ő), Cabécar
Ö̀ ö̀	O with diaeresis and grave	Zurich German (some spellings)
Ö̂ ö̂	O with diaeresis and circumflex	Middle Low German
Ö̌ ö̌	O with diaeresis and caron	
Ö̃ ö̃	O with diaeresis and tilde	Old High German
Ȫ ȫ	O with diaeresis and macron	Livonian, Middle High German
Ȫ̆ ȫ̆	O with diaeresis and macron and breve	Sogdian transliteration
Ö̆ ö̆	O with diaeresis and breve	Caucasian dialectology
Ỏ ỏ	O with hook above	Vietnamese
O̊ o̊	O with ring above	Old High German
Ő ő	O with double acute	Hungarian
Ǒ ǒ	O with caron	Pinyin transliteration
O̍ o̍	O with vertical line	Pe̍h-ōe-jī, Taiwanese Romanization System
O̎ o̎	O with double vertical line	
Ȍ ȍ	O with double grave	Croatian, Accented Slovenian
O̐ o̐	O with chandrabindu	
Ȏ ȏ	O with inverted breve	Croatian, Accented Slovenian
O̒ o̒	O with turned comma above	
Oʻ oʻ	O with turned comma above right	Uzbek
O̓ o̓	O with comma above	Greek transliteration
O̞ o̞	O with down tack below	Mid back rounded vowel
Ø ø 𐞢	O with stroke	Close-mid front rounded vowel; Danish, Faroese, Mazahua, Norwegian; Superscript form is an IPA superscript letter
Ø̀ ø̀	O with stroke and grave	
Ǿ ǿ	O with stroke and acute	Danish
Ø̂ ø̂	O with stroke and circumflex	
Ø̃ ø̃	O with stroke and tilde	
Ø̄ ø̄	O with stroke and macron	
Ø̄́ ø̄́	O with stroke, macron, and acute	
Ø̄̆ ø̄̆	O with stroke, macron, and breve	
Ø̆ ø̆	O with stroke and breve	
Ø̇ ø̇	O with stroke and dot above	
Ø̇́ ø̇́	O with stroke, dot above, and acute	
Ø̈ ø̈	O with stroke and diaeresis	
Ø̋ ø̋	O with stroke and double acute	
Ø̌ ø̌	O with stroke and caron	
Ø᷎ ø᷎	O with stroke and ogonek above	
Ø̨ ø̨	O with stroke and ogonek	
Ǿ̨ ǿ̨	O with stroke, ogonek, and acute	
Ø̨̄ ø̨̄	O with stroke, ogonek, and macron	
Ø̣ ø̣	O with stroke and dot below	
Ø̥ ø̥	O with stroke and ring below	
Ø̰ ø̰	O with stroke and tilde below	
Ǿ̰ ǿ̰	O with stroke, tilde below and acute	
Ø¸ø¸	O with stroke and cedilla	
Ǿ¸ǿ¸	O with stroke, cedilla and acute	
Ø̞ ø̞	O with stroke and down tack below	Mid front rounded vowel
Ɵ ɵ ᶱ	O with bar (= Barred O)	Close-mid central rounded vowel. Gio, Guambiano, Mayogo, Ute. Yanalif. cf. Cyrillic: Ө ө.
Ɵ́ ɵ́	O with bar and acute	Gio, Ute.
Ɵ̀ ɵ̀	O with bar and grave	Gio.
Ɵ̂ ɵ̂	O with bar and circumflex	Gio.
Ɵ̈ ɵ̈	O with bar and dieresis	Romanisation of Khitan.
Ɵ̱ ɵ̱	O with bar and macron below	Ute.
Ơ ơ	O with horn	Jarai, Vietnamese
Ớ ớ	O with horn and acute	Vietnamese
Ờ ờ	O with horn and grave	Vietnamese
Ỡ ỡ	O with horn and tilde	Vietnamese
Ơ̆ ơ̆	O with horn and breve	Jarai
Ở ở	O with horn and hook above	Vietnamese
O᷎ o᷎	O with ogonek above	
Ó᷎ ó᷎	O with ogonek above and acute	
𝼛	O with retroflex hook	Used in phonetic transcription of the Australian Aboriginal language Iwaidja
O̧ o̧	O with cedilla	
Ó̧ ó̧	O with acute and cedilla	
Ò̧ ò̧	O with grave and cedilla	
Ô̧ ô̧	O with circumflex and cedilla	
Ǒ̧ ǒ̧	O with caron and cedilla	
Ǫ ǫ	O with ogonek	Cayuga, Creek, Navajo, Gwich’in, Dogrib, Romance linguistics, Old Norse, Old Sámi orthography, Proto-Slavic transcription
Ǫ̀ ǫ̀	O with grave and ogonek	Tlicho
Ǫ́ ǫ́	O with acute and ogonek	Navajo, Old Icelandic, Old Norse, Romance dialectology, Slavic dialectology
Ǫ̂ ǫ̂	O with circumflex and ogonek	Middle Low German
Ǫ̃ ǫ̃	O with tilde and ogonek	Germanic dialectology, Romance dialectology, Proto-Slavic transcription
Ǭ ǭ	O with macron and ogonek	Germanic dialectology, Romance dialectology, Old Sámi orthography, Proto-Germanic transcription, Slavic dialectology
Ǭ̀ ǭ̀	O with macron, grave and ogonek	Romance dialectology
Ǭ́ ǭ́	O with macron, acute and ogonek	Romance dialectology, Slavic dialectology
Ǭ̂ ǭ̂	O with macron, circumflex and ogonek	
Ǭ̃ ǭ̃	O with macron, tilde and ogonek	Romance dialectology
Ǭ̆ ǭ̆	O with macron, breve and ogonek	North Germanic dialectology
Ǭ̌ ǭ̌	O with macron, caron and ogonek	
Ǫ̆ ǫ̆	O with breve and ogonek	Romance dialectology, Slavic dialectology
Ǫ̆́ ǫ̆́	O with breve, acute and ogonek	Romance dialectology
Ǫ̇ ǫ̇	O with dot above and ogonek	
Ǫ̇́ ǫ̇́	O with dot above, acute and ogonek	
Ǫ̈ ǫ̈	O with diaeresis and ogonek	Germanic dialectology, Rheinische Dokumenta
Ǫ̈̀ ǫ̈̀	O with diaeresis, grave and ogonek	
Ǫ̈́ ǫ̈́	O with diaeresis, acute and ogonek	
Ǫ̈̂ ǫ̈̂	O with diaeresis, circumflex and ogonek	
Ǫ̈̃ ǫ̈̃	O with diaeresis, tilde and ogonek	Germanic dialectology
Ǫ̈̄ ǫ̈̄	O with diaeresis, macron and ogonek	Germanic dialectology
Ǫ̈̌ ǫ̈̌	O with diaeresis, caron and ogonek	
Ǫ̋ ǫ̋	O with double acute and ogonek	
Ǫ̌ ǫ̌	O with caron and ogonek	
Ǫ̑ ǫ̑	O with inverted breve and ogonek	Glagolitic transliteration
Ǫ̣ ǫ̣	O with ogonek and dot below	
Ǫ̱ ǫ̱	O with ogonek and line below	
Ǫ̱́ ǫ̱́	O with ogonek, line below and acute	
Ǫ̱̀ ǫ̱̀	O with ogonek, line below and grave	
Ǫ᷎ ǫ᷎	O with ogonek above and ogonek	
O̭ o̭	O with circumflex below	
O̰ o̰	O with tilde below	
Ó̰ ó̰	O with tilde below and acute	
O̱ o̱	O with line below	Germanic dialectology
Ò̱ ò̱	O with grave and line below	
Ó̱ ó̱	O with acute and line below	
Ô̱ ô̱	O with circumflex and line below	
Ǒ̱ ǒ̱	O with caron and line below	
Õ̱ õ̱	O with tilde and line below	
Ō̱ ō̱	O with macron and line below	
Ṓ̱ ṓ̱	O with macron, acute and line below	Ancient Greek transliteration
Ṑ̱ ṑ̱	O with macron, grave and line below	
Ō̱̂ ō̱̂	O with macron, circumflex and line below	
Ö̱ ö̱	O with diaeresis and line below	Estonian Swedish, Germanic dialectology, Seneca
Ö̱́ ö̱́	O with diaeresis, acute and line below	
Ö̱̀ ö̱̀	O with diaeresis, grave and line below	
Ö̱̂ ö̱̂	O with diaeresis, circumflex and line below	
Ö̱̌ ö̱̌	O with diaeresis, caron and line below	
O̮ o̮	O with breve below	Uralic dialectology
Ọ ọ	O with dot below	Igbo, Obolo, Okpela, Samogitian dialectology, Greek dialectology, Accented Slovenian, Vietnamese, Yoruba
Ọ̀ ọ̀	O with grave and dot below	Greek dialectology
Ọ́ ọ́	O with acute and dot below	Greek dialectology, Accented Slovenian
Ộ ộ	O with circumflex and dot below	Vietnamese
Ọ̃ ọ̃	O with tilde and dot below	Samogitian dialectology
Ọ̄ ọ̄	O with macron and dot below	Greek dialectology, Proto-East Baltic transcription
Ọ̄̀ ọ̄̀	O with macron, grave and dot below	Greek dialectology
Ọ̄́ ọ̄́	O with macron, acute and dot below	Greek dialectology, Proto-East Baltic transcription
Ọ̄̃ ọ̄̃	O with macron, tilde and dot below	Proto-East Baltic transcription
Ọ̄̆ ọ̄̆	O with macron, breve and dot below	Greek dialectology
Ọ̆ ọ̆	O with breve and dot below	Romance dialectology
Ọ̈ ọ̈	O with diaeresis and dot below	Greek dialectology, Middle Low German
Ọ̈̀ ọ̈̀	O with diaeresis, grave and dot below	
Ọ̈́ ọ̈́	O with diaeresis, acute and dot below	
Ọ̈̂ ọ̈̂	O with diaeresis, circumflex and dot below	
Ọ̈̄ ọ̈̄	O with diaeresis, macron and dot below	Greek dialectology
Ọ̈̌ ọ̈̌	O with diaeresis, caron and dot below	
Ọ̌ ọ̌	O with caron and dot below	
Ọ̑ ọ̑	O with inverted breve and dot below	Accented Slovenian
Ợ ợ	O with horn and dot below	Vietnamese
Ọ ọ	O with vertical line and dot below	
O̤ o̤	O with diaeresis below	Uighur transliteration, Pu-Xian Min
Ò̤ ò̤	O with diaeresis below and grave	
Ó̤ ó̤	O with diaeresis below and acute	
Ô̤ ô̤	O with diaeresis below and circumflex	
Ö̤ ö̤	O with diaeresis below and diaeresis	
O̥ o̥	O with ring below	Arabic transliteration, Japanese dialectology
Ō̥ ō̥	O with ring below and macron	Japanese dialectology
O̬ o̬	O with caron below	Ossetian transliteration
O̯ o̯	O with inverted breve below	IPA and other phonetic alphabets
O̩ o̩	O with vertical line below	
Õ͔ õ͔	O with left arrowhead below and tilde	Uralic dialectology
Ō͔ ō͔	O with left arrowhead below and macron	Uralic dialectology
O̜ o̜	O with left half ring below	
O̹ o̹	O with right half ring below	
Ó̹ ó̹	O with right half ring below and acute	
O̲ o̲	O with underline	
ᴓ	Sideways O with stroke	UPA
ᶗ	Open O with retroflex hook	
Ꝍ ꝍ	O with loop	Medieval Nordic vowel /ǫ/, /øː/, and /ey/
ⱺ	O with low ring inside	Swedish Dialect Alphabet
Ꝋ ꝋ	O with long stroke overlay	Medieval abbreviation.
Ɔ́ ɔ́	Open O with acute	Nomaande, Nzime
Ɔ̀ ɔ̀	Open O with grave	
Ɔ̂ ɔ̂	Open O with circumflex	
Ɔ̌ ɔ̌	Open O with caron	
Ɔ̃ ɔ̃	Open O with tilde	
Ɔ̃́ ɔ̃́	Open O with tilde and acute	
Ɔ̃̀ ɔ̃̀	Open O with tilde and grave	
Ɔ̃̂ ɔ̃̂	Open O with tilde and circumflex	
Ɔ̃̌ ɔ̃̌	Open O with tilde and caron	
Ɔ̃̍ ɔ̃̍	Open O with tilde and vertical line	
Ɔ̄ ɔ̄	Open O with macron	
Ɔ̆ ɔ̆	Open O with breve	
Ɔ̈ ɔ̈	Open O with diaeresis	
Ɔ̌ ɔ̌	Open O with caron	
Ɔ̍ ɔ̍	Open O with vertical line	
Ɔ̣ ɔ̣	Open O with dot below	George Herzog's Jabo transcription
Ɔ̱ ɔ̱	Open O with line below	Nuer
Ɔ̧ ɔ̧	Open O with cedilla	Kako, Karang, Maka, Mundani, Pana
Ɔ̧̀ ɔ̧̀	Open O with grave and cedilla	Mundani
Ɔ̧́ ɔ̧́	Open O with acute and cedilla	Karang, Maka, Pana
Ɔ̧̂ ɔ̧̂	Open O with circumflex and cedilla	Mundani, Pana
Ɔ̧̌ ɔ̧̌	Open O with caron and cedilla	Mundani
Ɔ̨ ɔ̨	Open O with ogonek	Formerly sometimes used in IPA for nasalized ɔ, also in some Guinea Kpelle works
Ɔ̨́ ɔ̨́	Open O with ogonek and acute	In some Guinea Kpelle works
Ɔ̰ ɔ̰	Open O with tilde below	Mbelime, Nateni
Ɔ̰̀ ɔ̰̀	Open O with tilde below and grave	Mbelime
Ɔ̰́ ɔ̰́	Open O with tilde below and acute	Mbelime, Nateni
Ɔ̰̄ ɔ̰̄	Open O with tilde below and macron	Nateni
P̀ p̀	P with grave	ISO 9
Ṕ ṕ	P with acute	Võro; Previously used in Sorbian, Old Hungarian
P̃ p̃	P with tilde	South Efate, Yanesha, Old English abbreviation, Latin abbreviation
P̄ p̄	P with macron	Bislama, Kharosthi Transliteration, Hebrew romanization, Thai transliteration
P̆ p̆	P with breve	Uralic dialectology, Laz
Ṗ ṗ	P with dot above	Irish (old orthography)
P̈ p̈	P with diaeresis	Manichaean transliteration, Araki
P̋ p̋	P with double acute	Old Norse
P̑ p̑	P with inverted breve	Slavic dialectology
P̓ p̓	P with comma above	Nuxalk, Comox
P̕ p̕	P with comma above right	
P̔ p̔	P with reversed comma above	
P͑ p͑	P with left half ring above	
P̱ p̱	P with line below	Hebrew romanization, Old Persian
P̣ p̣	P with dot below	Georgian transliteration, Thai transliteration
P̤ p̤	P with diaeresis below	
P̬ p̬	P with caron below	IPA
P̪ p̪	P with bridge below	Voiceless labiodental plosive
Ᵽ ᵽ	P with stroke	Tanimuca-Retuarã
Ꝑ ꝑ	P with stroke through descender	Medieval abbreviations
ᵱ	P with middle tilde	
ᶈ	P with palatal hook	
Ƥ ƥ	P with hook	Obsolete symbol for voiceless bilabial implosive, Serer
Ꝓ ꝓ	P with flourish	Medieval abbreviations
Ꝕ ꝕ	P with squirrel tail	Medieval abbreviations
ᴘ̇	Small capital P with dot above	
Q́ q́	Q with acute	Tsimané, Old Hungarian, Latin abbreviation
Q̃ q̃	Q with tilde	abbreviation
Q̄ q̄	Q with macron	Latin abbreviation
Q̇ q̇	Q with dot above	Manichean transliteration, Old Uighur transliteration
Q̈ q̈	Q with diaeresis	Manichean transliteration, Old Uighur transliteration
Q̋ q̋	Q with double acute	Old Uighur transliteration (one method)
Q̓ q̓	Q with comma above	Comox, Nuxalk
Q̕ q̕	Q with comma above right	
Q̧ q̧	Q with cedilla	Caucasian dialectology
Q̣ q̣	Q with dot below	Georgian transliteration, Old Uighur transliteration
Q̣̇ q̣̇	Q with dot below and dot above	Old Uighur transliteration
Q̣̈ q̣̈	Q with dot below and diaeresis	Old Uighur transliteration
Q̱ q̱	Q with line below	
Ꝗ ꝗ	Q with stroke through descender	Medieval abbreviations
Ꝗ̃ ꝗ̃	Q with stroke through descender and tilde	
Ꝙ ꝙ	Q with diagonal stroke	Medieval abbreviations
ʠ	Q with hook	Obsolete symbol for voiceless uvular implosive
Ɋ ɋ	Q with hook tail	Numanggang
R̀ r̀	R with grave	Croatian, Wenzhounese Romanization System
Ŕ ŕ	R with acute	Croatian, Lower Sorbian, Slovak, Accented Slovenian, Wenzhounese Romanization System
R̂ r̂	R with circumflex	Ajië, Accented Latvian
R̃ r̃	R with tilde	Lithuanian, Accented Latvian, Karai-karai
R̄ r̄	R with macron	Armenian transliteration, Basque (alternative orthography), Wenzhounese Romanization System
R̆ r̆	R with breve	Nepali transliteration, Ithkuil transliteration
Ṙ ṙ	R with dot above	Urdu transliteration
R̋ r̋	R with double acute	
Ř ř	R with caron	Czech, Upper Sorbian, Wenzhounese Romanization System
R̍ r̍	R with vertical line	
Ȑ ȑ	R with double grave	Croatian, Accented Slovenian
Ȓ ȓ	R with inverted breve	Croatian, Accented Slovenian
R̓ r̓	R with comma above	
R̕ r̕	R with comma above right	
Ŗ ŗ	R with cedilla	Pre-1946 Latvian letter, still sometimes used in some non-standard orthographies
R̦ r̦	R with comma below	Latgalian
R̨ r̨	R with ogonek	Dravidian dialectology
R̨̄ r̨̄	R with ogonek and macron	Dravidian dialectology
Ꞧ ꞧ	R with oblique stroke	Pre-1921 Latvian letter
R̭ r̭	R with circumflex below	Old Persian Transliteration
Ṟ ṟ	R with line below	Pitjantjatjara, Pashto transliteration, Tamil transliteration
Ṛ ṛ	R with dot below	Afro-Asiatic transliteration, Inari Sami, Ndogo, Proto-Indo-European transcription,, Sanskrit transliteration, Sindhi transliteration
Ṛ̀ ṛ̀	R with dot below and grave	Proto-Indo-European transcription, Sanskrit transliteration
Ṛ́ ṛ́	R with dot below and acute	Proto-Indo-European transcription, Sanskrit transliteration
Ṝ ṝ	R with dot below and macron	Proto-Indo-European transcription, Sanskrit transliteration
Ṝ́ ṝ́	R with dot below, macron and acute	Proto-Indo-European transcription, Sanskrit transliteration
Ṝ̃ ṝ̃	R with dot below, macron and tilde	Sanskrit transliteration
Ṝ̆ ṝ̆	R with dot below, macron and breve	Proto-Indo-European transcription
R̤ r̤	R with diaeresis below	Telugu, Kannada, Tamil, and Malayalam transliteration
R̥ r̥	R with ring below	Proto-Indo-European transcription, Sanskrit transliteration
R̥̀ r̥̀	R with ring below and grave	Proto-Indo-European transcription, Sanskrit transliteration
Ŕ̥ ŕ̥	R with ring below and acute	Proto-Indo-European transcription, Sanskrit transliteration
R̥̂ r̥̂	R with ring below and circumflex	Proto-Indo-European transcription, Sanskrit transliteration
R̥̃ r̥̃	R with ring below and tilde	Proto-Indo-European transcription, Sanskrit transliteration
R̥̄ r̥̄	R with ring below and macron	Proto-Indo-European transcription, Sanskrit transliteration
R̥̄́ r̥̄́	R with ring below and macron and acute	Proto-Indo-European transcription, Sanskrit transliteration
R̥̄̆ r̥̄̆	R with ring below, macron and breve	Proto-Indo-European transcription
Ř̥ ř̥	R with ring below and caron	Sanskrit transliteration
R̬ r̬	R with caron below	IPA and other phonetic alphabets
R̩ r̩	R with vertical line below	IPA and other phonetic alphabets
R̯ r̯	R with inverted breve below	Dravidian dialectology
Ɍ ɍ	R with stroke	Kanuri; Gabon Languages Scientific Alphabet
ᵲ	R with middle tilde	
ꭨ	Turned r with middle tilde	Used in linguistic transcriptions of Scots
𝼨	R with mid-height left hook	Used by the British and Foreign Bible Society in the early 20th century for romanization of the Malayalam language.
ɺ 𐞦	Turned r with long leg	Alveolar lateral flap; Superscript form is an IPA superscript letter
𝼈 𐞧	Turned r with long leg and retroflex hook	Expected IPA symbol for voiced retroflex lateral flap; Superscript form is an IPA superscript letter
ᶉ	R with palatal hook	
ɻ ʵ	Turned r with hook	Retroflex approximant
𝼕	Turned r with palatal hook	Used in phonetic transcription
ⱹ	Turned r with tail	Swedish Dialect Alphabet
𝼷	R with tail and palatal hook	Obsolete IPA
꟢ ɼ	R with long leg	Former IPA letter;Historically used for Xhosa
Ɽ ɽ 𐞨	R with tail	Retroflex flap; Superscript form is an IPA superscript letter
ɾ 𐞩	R with fishhook	Alveolar flap; Superscript form is an IPA superscript letter
ᵳ	R with fishhook and middle tilde	
𝼖	R with fishhook and palatal hook	Used in phonetic transcription
ɿ	Reversed R with fishhook	IPA: [z̩]
ʀ̇	Small capital R with dot above	
ʀ̣	Small capital R with dot below	
Ꝛ́ ꝛ́	R rotunda with acute	
Ꝛ̣ ꝛ̣	R rotunda with dot below	
S̀ s̀	S with grave	Ugaritic transliteration, Wenzhounese Romanization System
Ś ś	S with acute	Polish, Sanskrit transliteration
Ś̀ ś̀	S with acute and grave	Semitic transliteration
Ś ś	S with acute and comma above right	
Ṥ ṥ	S with acute and dot above	ISO 259 Hebrew romanization
Ŝ ŝ	S with circumflex	Esperanto
S̃ s̃	S with tilde	Middle Low German, Latin abbreviation, Medieval Basque
S̄ s̄	S with macron	Basque (alternative orthography), Kharosthi transliteration, Thai transliteration
S̄̒ s̄̒	S with macron and turned comma above	
S̆ s̆	S with breve	
Ṡ ṡ	S with dot above	Irish (old orthography), Emiliano-Romagnolo, Medieval Basque
Ṡ̃ ṡ̃	S with dot above and tilde	Latin abbreviation
S̈ s̈	S with diaeresis	Seneca, Old Czech, Middle Low German
S̋ s̋	S with double acute	Hebrew transliteration (East European languages)
Š š	S with caron	Arabic, Syriac, Czech, Slovak, Comox, Croatian, Slovenian, Sorbian, Lithuanian, Latvian, Estonian, Bosnian, Ithkuil transliteration
Š̀ š̀	S with caron and grave	Semitic transliteration
Š́ š́	S with caron and acute	Avestan transliteration
Ṧ ṧ	S with caron and dot above	ISO 259 Hebrew romanization
Š̓ š̓	S with caron and comma above	
S̑ s̑	S with inverted breve	
S̒ s̒	S with turned comma above	
S̓ s̓	S with comma above	
S̕ s̕	S with comma above right	
Ş ş	S with cedilla	Azerbaijani, Bashkir, Chechen, Crimean Tatar, Gagauz, Karai-karai, Kazakh, Kurdish, Turkish and Turkmen, and in the Roman alphabets of Tatar
Ș ș	S with comma below	Romanian, cf. comma-below versus cedilla
S̨ s̨	S with ogonek	Moroccan Arabic transliteration, Romance dialectology
Š̨ š̨	S with ogonek and caron	Avestan transliteration
Ꞩ ꞩ	S with oblique stroke	Pre-1921 Latvian letter; pre-1950 Lower Sorbian letter
S̱ s̱	S with line below	Middle Persian transliteration, Kharosthi transliteration, Sindhi transliteration
Ś̱ ś̱	S with line below and acute	Kharosthi transliteration
S̮ s̮	S with breve below	Romance dialectology
Ṣ ṣ	S with dot below	Afro-Asiatic transliteration, Arabic transliteration, Hebrew romanization, Kharosthi transliteration, O'odham, Sanskrit transliteration, Sindhi transliteration, Yoruba
Ṣ́ ṣ́	S with dot below and acute	Gəˁəz transliteration
Ṣ̄ ṣ̄	S with dot below and macron	Kharosthi transliteration, Thai transliteration
Ṩ ṩ	S with dot below and dot above	Thaana transliteration, ISO 259 Hebrew romanization
Ṣ̌ ṣ̌	S with dot below and caron	Avestan transliteration, Pashto transliteration, Berber languages, Wakhi
Ṣ̕ ṣ̕	S with dot below and comma above right	
Ṣ̱ ṣ̱	S with dot below and line below	Kharosthi transliteration
S̤ s̤	S with diaeresis below	Extended Devanagari transliteration
Š̤ š̤	S with diaeresis below and caron	Manichaean transliteration
S̥ s̥	S with ring below	Greek dialectology
Ś̥ ś̥	S with ring below and acute	Carian transliteration
S̬ s̬	S with caron below	IPA and other phonetic alphabets
S̩ s̩	S with vertical line below	
S̪ s̪	S with bridge below	IPA and other phonetic alphabets
ꜱ̇	Small capital S with dot above	
ꜱ̣	Small capital S with dot below	
ſ́	Long s with acute	
ẛ	Long s with dot above	Irish orthography
ſ̣	Long s with dot below	
ᵴ	S with middle tilde	
𝼩	S with mid-height left hook	Used by the British and Foreign Bible Society in the early 20th century for romanization of the Malayalam language.
ᶊ	S with palatal hook	
ʂ ᶳ	Small S with hook	Voiceless retroflex fricative
Ʂ	Capital S with hook	Mandarin Chinese using the early draft version of pinyin romanization during the mid-1950s
Ȿ ȿ	S with swash tail	Shona
𝼞 𐞺	S with curl	Para-IPA version of the IPA fricative ɕ
ẜ	Long S with diagonal stroke	Pre-1921 Latvian letter; pre-1950 Lower Sorbian letter
ẝ	Long S with high stroke	
ᶋ	Esh with palatal hook	
ᶘ	Esh with retroflex hook	
ʆ	Esh with curl	
𝼋 𐞿	Esh with double bar	Used by Douglas Beach for a nasal click in his phonetic description of Khoekhoe
𝼌	Esh with double bar and curl	Used by Douglas Beach for a nasal click in his phonetic description of Khoekhoe
T̀ t̀	T with grave	Egyptian transliteration, Old Church Slavonic Transliteration
T́ t́	T with acute	Egyptian transliteration, Kharosthi transliteration
T̃ t̃	T with tilde	Latin abbreviation
T̄ t̄	T with macron	Basque (alternative orthography), ISO 9
T̆ t̆	T with breve	Uralic dialectology
T̆̀ t̆̀	T with breve and grave	
Ṫ ṫ	T with dot above	Irish (old orthography)
T̈ ẗ	T with diaeresis	Arabic transliteration
Ť ť	T with caron	Czech, Slovak
T̑ t̑	T with inverted breve	Slavic dialectology
T̓ t̓	T with comma above	Nuxalk, Comox
T̕ t̕	T with comma above right	
T̔ t̔	T with reversed comma above	
T͑ t͑	T with left half ring above	
Ţ ţ	T with cedilla	Gagauz, Semitic transliteration, Ithkuil transliteration
Ț ț	T with comma below	Romanian
T̨ t̨	T with ogonek	Old Norse, Avestan transliteration
T̗ t̗	T with acute below	Berber
Ṱ ṱ	T with circumflex below	Venda, Egyptian hieroglyphic transliteration
T̰ t̰	T with tilde below	Avestan transliteration
Ṯ ṯ	T with line below	Pashto transliteration, Arabic transliteration, Middle Persian transliteration, Thai transliteration
T̮ t̮	T with breve below	Romance dialectology
Ṭ ṭ	T with dot below	Arabic and Syriac transliteration, Sanskrit Transliteration, Kharosthi transliteration, Sindhi transliteration, Thai transliteration; used for the emphatic T sound heard in Afro-Asiatic languages
Ṭ́ ṭ́	T with dot below and acute	Kharosthi transliteration
T̤ t̤	T with diaeresis below	Sindhi transliteration
T̥ t̥	T with ring below	Carian transliteration
T̬ t̬	T with caron below	IPA and other phonetic alphabets
T̯ t̯	T with inverted breve below	Dravidian dialectology
T̪ t̪	T with bridge below	IPA and other phonetic alphabets
ƾ	Inverted glottal stop with stroke	Previously in IPA
𝼎	Inverted glottal stop with curl	Used by Douglas Beach for a nasal click in his phonetic description of Khoekhoe
Ŧ ŧ	T with stroke	Northern Sámi and Ume Sámi, Saanich, Ithkuil transliteration
Ⱦ ⱦ	T with diagonal stroke	Saanich
ᵵ	T with middle tilde	
𝼪	T with mid-height left hook	Used by the British and Foreign Bible Society in the early 20th century for romanization of the Malayalam language.
ƫ ᶵ	T with palatal hook	Previously in IPA
Ƭ ƭ	T with hook	Obsolete symbol for voiceless alveolar implosive, Serer
Ʈ ʈ 𐞯	T with retroflex hook	Voiceless retroflex plosive; Superscript form is an IPA superscript letter
𝼉	T with hook and retroflex hook	Symbol for voiceless retroflex implosive
ȶ	T with curl	Voiceless alveolo-palatal stop
ᴛ̇	Small capital T with dot above	
ᴛ̣	Small capital T with dot below	
Ù ù	U with grave	Emiliano-Romagnolo, Friulian, French, Italian, Maltese, Ndogo, Noni, Pe̍h-ōe-jī, Scottish Gaelic, Taiwanese Romanization System and other transliterations of Chinese dialects, Welsh, Zurich German (some spellings)
Ú ú	U with acute	Afrikaans, Catalan, Czech, Danish, Dutch, Faroese, Hungarian, Icelandic, Irish, Nateni, Ngiemboon, Nkonya, Nomaande, Occitan, Pe̍h-ōe-jī, Portuguese, Sisaala, Slovak, Accented Slovenian, Spanish, Taiwanese Romanization System and other transliterations of Chinese dialects, Welsh
Û û	U with circumflex	Afrikaans, Dutch, Emiliano-Romagnolo, French, Friulian, Kurdish, Ndogo, Pe̍h-ōe-jī, Taiwanese Romanization System and other transliterations of Chinese dialects, Turkish, Welsh
Ũ ũ	U with tilde	Carian transliteration, Kikuyu, Lao transliteration, Mirandese, Nande, Vietnamese
Ũ̀ ũ̀	U with tilde and grave	Carian transliteration
Ṹ ṹ	U with tilde and acute	Carian transliteration, Lao transliteration
Ũ̂ ũ̂	U with tilde and circumflex	
Ũ̊ ũ̊	U with tilde and ring above	Iranian dialectology
Ũ̌ ũ̌	U with tilde and caron	
Ũ̍ ũ̍	U with tilde and vertical line	
Ũ̎ ũ̎	U with tilde and double vertical line	
Ū ū	U with macron	Arabic transliteration, Old Sámi orthography, Latin, Latvian, Lithuanian, Livonian, Māori, Pali transliteration, Pe̍h-ōe-jī, Sanskrit transliteration, Shughni, Sindhi transliteration, Syriac transliteration cf. Cyrillic: Ӯ ӯ, Taiwanese Romanization System and other transliterations of Chinese dialects
Ū̀ ū̀	U with macron and grave	Livonian, Sanskrit and Pali Transliteration
Ū́ ū́	U with macron and acute	Accented Lithuanian, Sanskrit and Pali Transliteration, Ancient Greek transliteration
Ū̂ ū̂	U with macron and circumflex	
Ū̌ ū̌	U with macron and caron	
Ū̃ ū̃	U with macron and tilde	Sanskrit and Pali Transliteration
Ū̄ ū̄	U with macron and macron	Kienning Colloquial Romanized transliteration
Ū̆ ū̆	U with macron and breve	Latin
Ū̆́ ū̆́	U with macron, breve and acute	
Ṻ ṻ	U with macron and diaeresis	Tunisian Arabic transliteration
Ū̊ ū̊	U with macron and ring above	Shughni
Ŭ ŭ	U with breve	cf. Cyrillic: Ў ў, Belarusian, Esperanto, Jarai, Latin; previously used in Romanian
Ŭ̀ ŭ̀	U with breve and grave	
Ŭ́ ŭ́	U with breve and acute	Yaghnobi
U̇ u̇	U with dot above	Old Hungarian
U̇́ u̇́	U with dot above and acute	
U̇̄ u̇̄	U with dot above and macron	Old Hungarian
Ü ü	U with diaeresis	Azerbaijani, Catalan, Dutch, Estonian, Frisian, German, Hungarian, Luxembourgish, Norwegian, Rotuman, Slovak, Spanish, Tatar, Turkish, Turkmen, Welsh, Hanyu Pinyin; cf. Cyrillic: Ӱ ӱ
Ǜ ǜ	U with diaeresis and grave	Fourth tone for yu in Hanyu Pinyin, Zurich German (some spellings)
Ǘ ǘ	U with diaeresis and acute	Second tone for yu in Hanyu Pinyin
Ü̂ ü̂	U with diaeresis and circumflex	Middle Low German
Ü̃ ü̃	U with diaeresis and tilde	Old High German
Ǖ ǖ	U with diaeresis and macron	First tone for yu in Hanyu Pinyin
Ǖ̆ ǖ̆	U with diaeresis, macron and breve	Sogdian transliteration
Ü̆ ü̆	U with diaeresis and breve	Caucasian dialectology
Ǚ ǚ	U with diaeresis and caron	Third tone for yu in Hanyu Pinyin
Ủ ủ	U with hook above	Vietnamese
Ů ů	U with ring above	Czech, Old Lithuanian, Shughni
Ů́ ů́	U with ring above and acute	Old Lithuanian
Ů̃ ů̃	U with ring above and tilde	Old Lithuanian
Ű ű	U with double acute	cf. Cyrillic: Ӳ ӳ, Hungarian
Ǔ ǔ	U with caron	Pinyin
U̍ u̍	U with vertical line	Pe̍h-ōe-jī, Taiwanese Romanization System and other transliterations of Chinese dialects
U̎ u̎	U with double vertical line	
Ȕ ȕ	U with double grave	Croatian, Accented Slovenian
Ȗ ȗ	U with inverted breve	Croatian, Accented Slovenian
U̓ u̓	U with comma above	
U᷎ u᷎	U with ogonek above	
Ư ư	U with horn	Jarai, Vietnamese
Ứ ứ	U with horn and acute	Vietnamese
Ừ ừ	U with horn and grave	Vietnamese
Ữ ữ	U with horn and tilde	Vietnamese
Ư̆ ư̆	U with horn and breve	Jarai
Ử ử	U with horn and hook above	Vietnamese
Ự ự	U with horn and dot below	Vietnamese
U̧ u̧	U with cedilla	
Ú̧ ú̧	U with acute and cedilla	
Ù̧ ù̧	U with grave and cedilla	
Û̧ û̧	U with circumflex and cedilla	
Ǔ̧ ǔ̧	U with caron and cedilla	
Ų ų	U with ogonek	Lithuanian, Proto-Germanic transcription
Ų̀ ų̀	U with ogonek and grave	
Ų́ ų́	U with ogonek and acute	Accented Lithuanian
Ų̂ ų̂	U with ogonek and circumflex	
Ų̃ ų̃	U with ogonek and tilde	Accented Lithuanian
Ų̄ ų̄	U with ogonek and macron	Proto-Germanic transcription
Ų̄́ ų̄́	U with ogonek, macron and acute	
Ų̄̀ ų̄̀	U with ogonek, macron and grave	
Ų̄̂ ų̄̂	U with ogonek, macron and circumflex	
Ų̄̆ ų̄̆	U with ogonek, macron and breve	North Germanic dialectology
Ų̄̌ ų̄̌	U with ogonek, macron and caron	
Ų̆ ų̆	U with ogonek and breve	Germanic dialectology
Ų̈ ų̈	U with ogonek and diaeresis	
Ų̈́ ų̈́	U with ogonek, diaeresis and acute	
Ų̈̀ ų̈̀	U with ogonek, diaeresis and grave	
Ų̈̂ ų̈̂	U with ogonek, diaeresis and circumflex	
Ų̈̌ ų̈̌	U with ogonek, diaeresis and caron	
Ų̈̄ ų̈̄	U with ogonek, diaeresis and macron	
Ų̌ ų̌	U with ogonek and caron	
Ų̋ ų̋	U with ogonek and double acute	
Ų̱ ų̱	U with ogonek and line below	
Ų̱́ ų̱́	U with ogonek, line below and acute	
Ų̱̀ ų̱̀	U with ogonek, line below and grave	
Ṷ ṷ	U with circumflex below	IPA and other phonetic systems, Semitic transliteration
Ṵ ṵ	U with tilde below	IPA and other phonetic systems, Semitic transliteration
Ṵ̀ ṵ̀	U with tilde below and grave	
Ṵ́ ṵ́	U with tilde below and acute	
Ṵ̄ ṵ̄	U with tilde below and macron	
Ṵ̈ ṵ̈	U with tilde below and diaeresis	
U̱ u̱	U with line below	Germanic dialectology, Aguaruna
Ù̱ ù̱	U with line below and grave	
Ú̱ ú̱	U with line below and acute	
Û̱ û̱	U with line below and circumflex	
Ũ̱ ũ̱	U with line below and tilde	
Ū̱ ū̱	U with line below and macron	
Ū̱́ ū̱́	U with line below, macron and acute	Ancient Greek transliteration
Ū̱̀ ū̱̀	U with line below, macron and grave	Ancient Greek transliteration
Ū̱̂ ū̱̂	U with line below, macron and circumflex	
Ü̱ ü̱	U with line below and diaeresis	Germanic dialectology
Ǘ̱ ǘ̱	U with line below, diaeresis and acute	
Ǜ̱ ǜ̱	U with line below, diaeresis and grave	
Ü̱̂ ü̱̂	U with line below, diaeresis and circumflex	
Ǚ̱ ǚ̱	U with line below, diaeresis and caron	
Ǔ̱ ǔ̱	U with line below and caron	
Ụ ụ	U with dot below	Nyakyusa, Vietnamese, Thai transliteration
Ụ̀ ụ̀	U with dot below and grave	
Ụ́ ụ́	U with dot below and acute	
Ụ̂ ụ̂	U with dot below and circumflex	
Ụ̃ ụ̃	U with dot below and tilde	
Ụ̄ ụ̄	U with dot below and macron	Romance dialectology, Thai transliteration
Ụ̈ ụ̈	U with dot below and diaeresis	Middle Low German
Ụ̈̀ ụ̈̀	U with dot below, diaeresis and grave	
Ụ̈́ ụ̈́	U with dot below, diaeresis and acute	
Ụ̈̂ ụ̈̂	U with dot below, diaeresis and circumflex	
Ụ̈̌ ụ̈̌	U with dot below, diaeresis and caron	
Ụ̌ ụ̌	U with dot below and caron	
Ụ̍ ụ̍	U with dot below and vertical line	
Ṳ ṳ	U with diaeresis below	Uighur transliteration, Pe̍h-ōe-jī; Gabon Languages Scientific Alphabet
Ṳ̀ ṳ̀	U with diaeresis below and grave	Pe̍h-ōe-jī
Ṳ́ ṳ́	U with diaeresis below and acute	Pe̍h-ōe-jī
Ṳ̂ ṳ̂	U with diaeresis below and circumflex	Pe̍h-ōe-jī
Ṳ̈ ṳ̈	U with diaeresis below and diaeresis	
U̥ u̥	U with ring below	
Ü̥ ü̥	U with ring below and diaeresis	
U̯ u̯	U with inverted breve below	
Ũ̯ ũ̯	U with inverted breve below and tilde	
Ü̯ ü̯	U with inverted breve below and diaeresis	
U̩ u̩	U with vertical line below	
U͔ u͔	U with left arrowhead below	
Ũ͔ ũ͔	U with left arrowhead below and tilde	
Ū͔ ū͔	U with left arrowhead below and macron	
Ʉ ʉ ᶶ	U bar	Close central rounded vowel
Ʉ̀ ʉ̀	U bar with grave	
Ʉ́ ʉ́	U bar with acute	Nzime
Ʉ̂ ʉ̂	U bar with circumflex	Nzime
Ʉ̃ ʉ̃	U bar with tilde	
Ʉ̄ ʉ̄	U bar with macron	
Ʉ̈ ʉ̈	U bar with diaeresis	
Ʉ̌ ʉ̌	U bar with caron	
Ʉ̧ ʉ̧	U bar with cedilla	
Ʉ̰ ʉ̰	U bar with tilde below	
Ʉ̰́ ʉ̰́	U bar with tilde below and acute	
Ʉ̱ ʉ̱	U bar with line below	
Ʉ̱́ ʉ̱́	U bar with line below and acute	
Ʉ̱̀ ʉ̱̀	U bar with line below and grave	
Ʉ̱̂ ʉ̱̂	U bar with line below and circumflex	
Ʉ̱̈ ʉ̱̈	U bar with line below and diaeresis	
Ʉ̱̌ ʉ̱̌	U bar with line below and caron	
Ʉ̥ ʉ̥	U bar with ring below	
Ꞹ ꞹ	U with stroke	Mazahua
ᵾ	Small capital U with stroke	
ᶙ	U with retroflex hook	
ꭒ̀	U with left hook with grave	
ꭒ́	U with left hook with acute	
ꭒ̆	U with left hook with breve	
ꭒ̆̀	U with left hook with breve and grave	
ꭒ̆́	U with left hook with breve and acute	
ꭒ̄	U with left hook with macron	
ꭒ̄̀	U with left hook with macron and grave	
ꭒ̄́	U with left hook with macron and acute	
ꭒ̃	U with left hook with tilde	
Ꞿ ꞿ	Glottal U	Ugaritic transliteration
ʮ	Turned H with fishhook	
ʯ	Turned H with fishhook and tail	
ɰ ᶭ	Turned M with long leg	Velar approximant
Ʊ̀ ʊ̀	Upsilon with grave	
Ʊ́ ʊ́	Upsilon with acute	
Ʊ̃ ʊ̃	Upsilon with tilde	
ᵿ	Upsilon with stroke	Near-close central rounded vowel
V̀ v̀	V with grave	
V́ v́	V with acute	
V̂ v̂	V with circumflex	
Ṽ ṽ	V with tilde	Mundang
Ṽ̀ ṽ̀	V with tilde and grave	
Ṽ́ ṽ́	V with tilde and acute	
Ṽ̂ ṽ̂	V with tilde and circumflex	
Ṽ̌ ṽ̌	V with tilde and caron	
V̄ v̄	V with macron	Maore
V̄̀ v̄̀	V with macron and grave	
V̄́ v̄́	V with macron and acute	
V̄̂ v̄̂	V with macron and circumflex	
V̄̃ v̄̃	V with macron and tilde	
V̄̄ v̄̄	V with macron and macron	
V̄̆ v̄̆	V with macron and breve	
V̄̌ v̄̌	V with macron and caron	
V̆ v̆	V with breve	
V̆́ v̆́	V with breve and acute	
V̇ v̇	V with dot above	
V̈ v̈	V with diaeresis	Middle Low German
V̈̀ v̈̀	V with diaeresis and grave	
V̈́ v̈́	V with diaeresis and acute	
V̈̂ v̈̂	V with diaeresis and circumflex	
V̈̄ v̈̄	V with diaeresis and macron	
V̈̌ v̈̌	V with diaeresis and caron	
V̊ v̊	V with ring above	Middle Low German
V̋ v̋	V with double acute	
V̌ v̌	V with caron	
V̍ v̍	V with vertical line	
V̏ v̏	V with double grave	
V̐ v̐	V with chandrabindu	
V̓ v̓	V with comma above	
V̧ v̧	V with cedilla	
V̨ v̨	V with ogonek	
V̨̀ v̨̀	V with ogonek and grave	
V̨́ v̨́	V with ogonek and acute	
V̨̂ v̨̂	V with ogonek and circumflex	
V̨̌ v̨̌	V with ogonek and caron	
V̨̄ v̨̄	V with ogonek and macron	
V̨̄́ v̨̄́	V with ogonek, macron and acute	
V̨̄̀ v̨̄̀	V with ogonek, macron and grave	
V̨̄̂ v̨̄̂	V with ogonek, macron and circumflex	
V̨̄̌ v̨̄̌	V with ogonek, macron and caron	
V̨̈ v̨̈	V with ogonek and diaeresis	
V̨̈́ v̨̈́	V with ogonek, diaeresis and acute	
V̨̈̀ v̨̈̀	V with ogonek, diaeresis and grave	
V̨̈̂ v̨̈̂	V with ogonek, diaeresis and circumflex	
V̨̈̌ v̨̈̌	V with ogonek, diaeresis and caron	
V̨̈̄ v̨̈̄	V with ogonek, diaeresis and macron	
V̨̋ v̨̋	V with ogonek and double acute	
V̨̱ v̨̱	V with ogonek and line below	
V̨̱́ v̨̱́	V with ogonek, line below and acute	
V̨̱̀ v̨̱̀	V with ogonek, line below and grave	
V̨̱̂ v̨̱̂	V with ogonek, line below and circumflex	
V̨̱̌ v̨̱̌	V with ogonek, line below and caron	
V̱ v̱	V with line below	
V̱̀ v̱̀	V with line below and grave	
V̱́ v̱́	V with line below and acute	
V̱̂ v̱̂	V with line below and circumflex	
V̱̌ v̱̌	V with line below and caron	
Ṽ̱ ṽ̱	V with line below and tilde	
V̱̈ v̱̈	V with line below and diaeresis	
V̱̈́ v̱̈́	V with line below, diaeresis and acute	
V̱̈̀ v̱̈̀	V with line below, diaeresis and grave	
V̱̈̂ v̱̈̂	V with line below, diaeresis and circumflex	
V̱̈̌ v̱̈̌	V with line below, diaeresis and caron	
Ṿ ṿ	V with dot below	Inari Sami, ALA-LC and DIN 31636 Hebrew romanization (written as w in the main romanization)
V̥ v̥	V with ring below	
Ꝟ ꝟ	V with diagonal stroke	Medieval abbreviations
ᶌ	V with palatal hook	
Ʋ ʋ ᶹ	V with hook (Script V)	Labiodental approximant;Bissa, Kabye
Ʋ̀ ʋ̀	V with hook (Script V) with grave	
Ʋ́ ʋ́	V with hook (Script V) with acute	Nkonya
Ʋ̂ ʋ̂	V with hook (Script V) with circumflex	
Ʋ̃ ʋ̃	V with hook (Script V) with tilde	
Ʋ̈ ʋ̈	V with hook (Script V) with diaeresis	
Ʋ̌ ʋ̌	V with hook (Script V) with caron	
ⱱ 𐞰	V with right hook	Labiodental flap; Superscript form is an IPA superscript letter
ⱴ	V with curl	
Ꝩ́ ꝩ́	Vend with acute	
Ꝩ̇ ꝩ̇	Vend with dot above	
Ꝩ̣ ꝩ̣	Vend with dot below	
Ʌ́ ʌ́	Turned V with acute	Eastern Dan, Goo, Oneida language, Temne
Ʌ̀ ʌ̀	Turned V with grave	Eastern Dan, Goo, Temne
Ʌ̂ ʌ̂	Turned V with circumflex	Eastern Dan, Goo, Temne
Ʌ̌ ʌ̌	Turned V with caron	Temne
Ʌ̋ ʌ̋	Turned V with double acute	Eastern Dan
Ʌ̏ ʌ̏	Turned V with double grave	Eastern Dan
Ʌ̄ ʌ̄	Turned V with macron	Eastern Dan
Ʌ̃ ʌ̃	Turned V with tilde	Wounaan
Ʌ̈ ʌ̈	Turned V with dieresis	Northern Embera
ʌ̨	Turned V with ogonek	Americanist phonetic notation
Ʌ̲ ʌ̲	Turned V with line below	Oneida
Ʌ̲́ ʌ̲́	Turned V with line below and acute	Oneida
Ẁ ẁ	W with grave	Welsh
Ẃ ẃ	W with acute	Welsh
Ŵ ŵ	W with circumflex	Chichewa, Nsenga, Welsh, ISO 259 Hebrew romanization, Tumbuka
W̃ w̃	W with tilde	Wamey
W̄ w̄	W with macron	
W̆ w̆	W with breve	
Ẇ ẇ	W with dot above	ISO 259 Hebrew romanization
Ẅ ẅ	W with diaeresis	Ngiemboon, Welsh, Tlingit
W̤ w̤	W with diaeresis below	Gabon Languages Scientific Alphabet
W̊ ẘ	W with ring above	Arabic transliteration
W̋ w̋	W with double acute	
W̌ w̌	W with caron	
W̍ w̍	W with vertical line	
W̓ w̓	W with comma above	Comox
W̱ w̱	W with line below	Saanich
Ẉ ẉ	W with dot below	Urdu transliteration
W̥ w̥	W with ring below	
W̬ w̬	W with caron below	
Ⱳ ⱳ	W with hook	Puguli language
ʼW ʼw	W with modified letter apostrophe	Karai-karai
X̀ x̀	X with grave	Azerbaijani (some dialects), Caucasian dialectology
X́ x́	X with acute	Avestan transliteration, Caucasian dialectology
X̂ x̂	X with circumflex	
X̃ x̃	X with tilde	Avar transliteration
X̄ x̄	X with macron	Latin abbreviation
X̆ x̆	X with breve	Caucasian dialectology
X̆́ x̆́	X with breve and acute	Caucasian dialectology
Ẋ ẋ	X with dot above	Americanist phonetic notation, Pashto transliteration
Ẍ ẍ	X with diaeresis	Kurdish
X̊ x̊	X with ring above	
X̌ x̌	X with caron	Wakhi
X̓ x̓	X with comma above	
X̕ x̕	X with comma above right	
X̱ x̱	X with line below	Saanich
X̱̓ x̱̓	X with line below and comma above	
X̣ x̣	X with dot below	Nuxalk
X̣̓ x̣̓	X with dot below and comma above	
X̥ x̥	X with ring below	
ᶍ	X with palatal hook	
Ỳ ỳ	Y with grave	Vietnamese, Welsh
Ý ý	Y with acute	Afrikaans, Czech, Faroese, Icelandic, Old Norse, Slovak, Turkmen, Vietnamese, Welsh
Ŷ ŷ	Y with circumflex	Old Tupi, Welsh
Ỹ ỹ	Y with tilde	Vietnamese
Ȳ ȳ	Y with macron	Cornish, Latin, Livonian, Old English
Ȳ̀ ȳ̀	Y with macron and grave	
Ȳ́ ȳ́	Y with macron and acute	
Ȳ̃ ȳ̃	Y with macron and tilde	
Ȳ̆ ȳ̆	Y with macron and breve	Latin
Y̆ y̆	Y with breve	Latin
Y̆̀ y̆̀	Y with breve and grave	
Y̆́ y̆́	Y with breve and acute	
Ẏ ẏ	Y with dot above	Middle English
Ẏ́ ẏ́	Y with dot above and acute	
Ÿ ÿ	Y with diaeresis	French, Greek transliteration, Ngiemboon, Welsh
Ÿ́ ÿ́	Y with diaeresis and acute	
Y̊ ẙ	Y with ring above	Arabic transliteration
Y̋ y̋	Y with double acute	
Y̌ y̌	Y with caron	
Y̍ y̍	Y with vertical line	
Y̎ y̎	Y with double vertical line	
Y̐ y̐	Y with chandrabindu	
Y̓ y̓	Y with comma above	Comox
Ỷ ỷ	Y with hook above	Vietnamese
Y᷎ y᷎	Y with ogonek above	
Y̱ y̱	Y with line below	Old Persian transliteration
Ỵ ỵ	Y with dot below	Vietnamese, Thai transliteration
Ỵ̣ ỵ̣	Y with colon below	Sogdian transliteration
Y̥ y̥	Y with ring below	
Y̯ y̯	Y with inverted breve below	
Ɏ ɏ	Y with stroke	Lubuagan Kalinga
Ƴ ƴ	Y with hook	Fula, Hausa
Ỿ ỿ	Y with loop	Medieval Welsh
Z̀ z̀	Z with grave	Old Welsh, Wenzhounese Romanization System
Ź ź	Z with acute	Polish, Wenzhounese Romanization System
Ẑ ẑ	Z with circumflex	Pinyin Cyrillic transliteration
Z̃ z̃	Z with tilde	Middle Low German
Z̄ z̄	Z with macron	Old Berber transliteration, Wenzhounese Romanization System
Ż ż	Z with dot above	Polish, Maltese, Ithkuil transliteration
Z̈ z̈	Z with diaeresis	Manichean transliteration
Z̋ z̋	Z with double acute	Polish (17th century)
Ž ž	Z with caron	Czech, Slovak, Croatian, Slovenian, Lithuanian, Latvian, Bosnian, Azerbaijani (some dialects), Wenzhounese Romanization System, Ithkuil transliteration
Ž́ ž́	Z with caron and acute	Avestan transliteration
Ž̏ ž̏	Z with caron and double grave	
Z̑ z̑	Z with inverted breve	
Z̓ z̓	Z with comma above	
Z̕ z̕	Z with comma above right	
Z̨ z̨	Z with ogonek	Moroccan Arabic transliteration, Romance dialectology
Z̗ z̗	Z with acute below	
Ẕ ẕ	Z with line below	Middle Persian transliteration, 1953 Hebrew Academy romanization of Hebrew, Sindhi transliteration
Z̮ z̮	Z with breve below	Romance dialectology
Ẓ ẓ	Z with dot below	Arabic transliteration, Sindhi transliteration
Ẓ́ ẓ́	Z with dot below and acute	Tumshuqese transliteration
Ẓ̌ ẓ̌	Z with dot below and caron	Wakhi
Ẓ̣ ẓ̣	Z with colon below	Arabic transliteration
Z̤ z̤	Z with diaeresis below	Persian transliteration, Sindhi transliteration
Z̥ z̥	Z with ring below	
Ƶ ƶ	Z with stroke	Yanalif, Polish (as an allograph of Ż, used only in uppercase), Unifon e.f. Cyrillic: Ꙃ ꙃ
ᵶ	Z with middle tilde	
ᶎ	Small Z with palatal hook	
Ᶎ	Capital Z with palatal hook	Mandarin Chinese using the early draft version of pinyin romanization during the mid-1950s
Ȥ ȥ	Z with hook	Medieval German
ʐ ᶼ	Z with retroflex hook	Voiced retroflex fricative
ʑ ᶽ	Z with curl	IPA voiced alveolo-palatal fricative, 1956-1958 Yi mixed script alphabet
Ɀ ɀ	Z with swash tail	Shona
Ⱬ ⱬ	Z with descender	Uyghur. cf. Cyrillic: Ҙ ҙ
Ʒ́ ʒ́	Ezh with acute	
Ʒ̇ ʒ̇	Ezh with dot above	
Ǯ ǯ	Ezh with caron	Karelian, Skolt Sámi
Ǯ́ ǯ́	Ezh with caron and acute	
Ʒ̥ ʒ̥	Ezh with ring below	
ᶚ	Ezh with retroflex hook	
𝼘	Ezh with palatal hook	Previously in IPA
ƺ	Ezh with tail	Previously in IPA
ʓ	Ezh with curl	
Þ́ þ́	Thorn with acute	
Þ̣ þ̣	Thorn with dot below	
Ꝥ ꝥ	Thorn with stroke	Old English and Middle English abbreviation for þæt or þat (thorn with diagonal stroke); Old Norse abbreviation for þat, þess, þor- (thorn with horizontal stroke).
Ꝧ ꝧ	Thorn with stroke through descender	Medieval abbreviations
ƻ	Two with stroke	Previously in IPA
Ꜯ ꜯ	Cuatrillo with comma	Mayan glottalized alveolar affricate /tsˀ/
ʡ 𐞳	Glottal stop with stroke	Epiglottal plosive; Superscript form is an IPA superscript letter
ʢ 𐞴	Reversed glottal stop with stroke	Voiced epiglottal fricative; Superscript form is an IPA superscript letter
ː 𐞁	Triangular colon	IPA long length mark; Superscript form is an IPA superscript letter
aː	long a	phonetic sound
eː	long e	phonetic sound
iː	long i	phonetic sound
oː	long o	phonetic sound
uː	long u	phonetic sound
ʓː	long ezh with curl	
ʡː	long glottal stop with stroke	
ˑ 𐞂	Half of triangular colon	IPA half-long length mark; Superscript form is an IPA superscript letter

== Digraphs and Ligatures ==
Ligatures, Digraphs
Letter	Name	Writing System	IPA value(s)	Notes
Ꜳ ꜳ 𐞀	AA	Medieval Nordic	/aː/	Superscript form is used as a Voice Quality Symbol (VoQS)
Ꜳ́ ꜳ́	AA with acute			
Ꜳ̋ ꜳ̋	AA with double acute			
Ꜳ̇ ꜳ̇	AA with dot above			
Ꜳ̈ ꜳ̈	AA with diaeresis			
Ꜳ̣ ꜳ̣	AA with dot below			
Æ æ ᴭ 𐞃	AE	IPA	/æ/	IPA near-open front unrounded vowel, Ash, Aesc, Danish, cf. Cyrillic: Ӕ ӕ, English, Faroese, Icelandic, Norwegian, Sámi, Thai transliteration. Superscript 𐞃 is an IPA letter
Æ̀ æ̀	AE with grave			Old Faroese
Ǽ ǽ	AE with acute			Danish
Æ̂ æ̂	AE with circumflex			
Æ̌ æ̌	AE with caron			
Æ̃ æ̃	AE with tilde			
Ǣ ǣ	AE with macron	Old English		
Ǣ ǣ	AE with macron	Old Sámi		
Æ̈ æ̈	AE with diaeresis	IPA	/æ̈/	Centralized near-open front unrounded vowel
Æ̈ æ̈	AE with diaeresis	Waorani	/æ̃/	
æ͔̃	AE with left arrowhead below and tilde	UPA		
æ̞	AE with down tack below	IPA		
ᴁ	Small capital AE	UPA		
ᴂ ᵆ	Turned AE	UPA		
ꬱ	A reversed-Schwa			Anthropos phonetic transcription system
Ꜵ ꜵ	AO	Medieval Nordic	/ǫ/	
Ꜵ́ ꜵ́	AO with acute			
Ꜵ̋ ꜵ̋	AO with double acute			
Ꜵ̣ ꜵ̣	AO with dot below			
Ꜷ ꜷ	AU	Medieval Nordic	/au/, /ǫ/, /ø/, /øː/	
Ꜷ́ ꜷ́	AU with acute			
Ꜹ ꜹ	AV	Medieval Nordic	/au/, /ǫ/, /ø/, /øː/	
Ꜻ ꜻ	AV with horizontal bar	Medieval Nordic	/ǫ/, /ø/, /øː/, /ęː/	
Ꜹ́ ꜹ́	AV with acute			
Ꜹ̋ ꜹ̋	AV with double acute			
Ꜻ́ ꜻ́	AV with horizontal bar and acute			
Ꜽ ꜽ	AY	Medieval Nordic	/ǫ/, /øː/, /ey/	
Ꜽ̇ ꜽ̇	AY with dot above			
Ꜽ̣ ꜽ̣	AY with dot below			
𝽛	Stretched c-h digraph	Initial Teaching Alphabet		
ȸ	DB digraph	Nonstandard IPA	/b̪/	Nonstandard IPA voiced labiodental plosive, especially in Bantu linguistics
𝼟	D-eth digraph	IPA (obsolete)		Non-sibilant coronal ligature
ʤ 𐞊	Dezh digraph	IPA (obsolete)	/dʒ/	Former IPA voiced postalveolar affricate; Superscript form is an IPA superscript letter
𝼫	Dezh digraph with curl	IPA (obsolete)		Historical sibilant ligature
𝼒	Dezh digraph with palatal hook			Used in phonetic transcription
𝼙	Dezh digraph with retroflex hook			Has been used in phonetic descriptions of Polish
𝼠	D-lezh digraph	IPA (obsolete)		Non-sibilant coronal ligature
𝼡	D-lezh digraph with retroflex hook	IPA (obsolete)		Non-sibilant coronal ligature
ʣ 𐞇	DZ digraph	IPA (obsolete)	/dz/	Former IPA voiced alveolar sibilant affricate; Superscript form is an IPA superscript letter
ʥ 𐞉	DZ digraph with curl	IPA (obsolete)	/dʑ/	Former IPA voiced alveolo-palatal sibilant affricate; Superscript form is an IPA superscript letter
ꭦ 𐞈	DZ digraph with retroflex hook	IPA (obsolete)	/dʐ/	Former IPA voiced retroflex sibilant affricate; Superscript form is an IPA superscript letter
Ǳ ǲ ǳ	DZ			Hungarian, Slovak
Ǆ ǅ ǆ	DZ with caron			Used in Gaj's Latin alphabet for Serbo-Croatian, Slovak
𝽜	Lunate ee	Initial Teaching Alphabet		
ﬀ	Ligature FF			Stylistical ligature
ﬃ	Ligature FFI			Stylistical ligature
ﬄ	Ligature FFL			Stylistical ligature
ﬁ	Ligature FI			Stylistical ligature
ﬂ	Ligature FL			Stylistical ligature
ʩ 𐞐	Feng digraph	extIPA		extIPA voiceless velopharyngeal fricative; Superscript form is part of the Extensions to the International Phonetic Alphabet for disordered speech (extIPA)
𝼀	Feng digraph with trill	extIPA		
𝽝	IE	Initial Teaching Alphabet		
Ĳ ĳ	Ligature IJ			Dutch, West Frisian, Stylistical ligature
ꭡ	Iotified E (Iotated E)			historically used for Yakut
Ỻ ỻ	Middle-Welsh Ll	Medieval Welsh		
ʪ 𐞙	LS digraph	IPA	/ʪ/	IPA voiceless alveolar lateral–median fricative; Superscript form is part of the Extensions to the International Phonetic Alphabet for disordered speech (extIPA)
ʫ 𐞚	LZ digraph	IPA	/ʫ/	IPA voiced alveolar non-sibilant fricative; Superscript form is part of the Extensions to the International Phonetic Alphabet for disordered speech (extIPA)
ɮ 𐞞	LEZH digraph	IPA	/ɮ/	IPA voiced alveolar lateral fricative; Superscript form is an IPA superscript letter
𝼅 𐞟	Small lezh with retroflex hook	extIPA	/ɭ˔/	Superscript form is an IPA superscript letter
Œ œ ꟹ	Ligature OE	IPA	/œ/	IPA open-mid front rounded vowel, English, Ethel, French
Œ̀ œ̀	Ligature OE with grave			
Œ́ œ́	Ligature OE with acute			
Œ̂ œ̂	Ligature OE with circumflex			
Œ̃ œ̃	Ligature OE with tilde			
Œ̄ œ̄	Ligature OE with macron			
ɶ 𐞣	Small capital OE	IPA	/ɶ/	IPA open front rounded vowel, superscript form is an IPA superscript letter
ᴔ	Turned OE	UPA		Otto Bremer's phonetic transcription system for German dialectology
ᴔ	Turned OE	Otto Bremer's transcription		Otto Bremer's phonetic transcription system for German dialectology
ꭂ	Turned OE with horizontal stroke	Otto Bremer's transcription		Otto Bremer's phonetic transcription system for German dialectology
ꭁ	Turned OE with stroke	Otto Bremer's transcription		Otto Bremer's phonetic transcription system for German dialectology
ꭢ	Open OE			historically used for Yakut
𝽞	OI digraph	Initial Teaching Alphabet		
Ꝏ ꝏ	OO	Medieval Nordic	/oː/	
Ꝏ́ ꝏ́	OO with acute			
Ꝏ̈ ꝏ̈	OO with diaeresis			
Ꝏ̋ ꝏ̋	OO with double acute			
ꭃ	Turned O with Open-O			Otto Bremer's phonetic transcription system for German dialectology
ꭄ	Turned O with Open-O with stroke			Otto Bremer's phonetic transcription system for German dialectology
𝽟	OU digraph	Initial Teaching Alphabet		
ȹ	QP digraph	Nonstandard IPA	/p̪/	Nonstandard IPA voiceless labiodental plosive, especially in Bantu linguistics
ẞ ß	Sharp S			German eszett
𝾕	Ligature long s with descender s			Historical mathematical symbol for the fifth power of the unknown
ﬆ	Ligature ST			Stylistical ligature
ﬅ	Long S-T			Stylistical ligature
𝽢	Esh-h digraph	Initial Teaching Alphabet		
ʨ 𐞫	TC digraph with curl	IPA (obsolete)	/tɕ/	Former IPA voiceless alveolo-palatal sibilant affricate; Superscript form is an IPA superscript letter
ʧ 𐞮	Tesh digraph	IPA (obsolete)	/tʃ/	Former IPA voiceless palato-alveolar sibilant affricate; Superscript form is an IPA letter
𝼬	Tesh digraph with curl	IPA (obsolete)		Historical sibilant ligature
𝼗	Tesh digraph with palatal hook			Used in phonetic transcription
𝼜	Tesh digraph with retroflex hook			Has been used in phonetic descriptions of Polish
Ꜩ ꜩ	TEZH			Mayan palato-alveolar affricate /ts/, Stylistical ligature
ᵺ	TH with strikethrough			Random House dictionaries’ phonetic transcription
𝽣	Stretched t-h digraph	Initial Teaching Alphabet		
𝽤	Reversed t-h digraph	Initial Teaching Alphabet		
𝽸 𝽹	Phonotypic th	English Phonotypic Alphabet		
𝼢	TL digraph with belt	IPA (obsolete)		Non-sibilant coronal ligature
𝼣	TL digraph with retroflex hook and belt	IPA (obsolete)		Non-sibilant coronal ligature
ʦ 𐞬	TS digraph	IPA (obsolete)	/ts/	Former IPA voiceless alveolar sibilant affricate; Superscript form is an IPA superscript letter
ꭧ 𐞭	TS digraph with retroflex hook	IPA (obsolete)	/tʂ/	Former IPA voiceless retroflex sibilant affricate; Superscript form is an IPA superscript letter
𝼸	TS digraph with palatal hook	Obsolete IPA		
𝼤	T-theta digraph	IPA (obsolete)		Non-sibilant coronal ligature
ꭀ	Inverted OE			Anthropos phonetic transcription system
ᵫ	UE			Merriam-Webster phonetic transcription system
ꭐ	UI			Anthropos phonetic transcription system
ꭑ	Turned UI			Anthropos phonetic transcription system
ꭣ	UO			historically used for Yakut
Ꝡ ꝡ	VY	Medieval Nordic	/yː/	
Ꝡ̈ ꝡ̈	VY with diaeresis			
Ꝡ̋ ꝡ̋	VY with double acute			
𝽥	WH digraph	Initial Teaching Alphabet		
ꟓ	Double Þ			used in Ormulum to indicate a preceding short vowel
ꟕ	Double Ƿ			used in Ormulum to indicate a preceding short vowel

== Multigraphs ==
- Trigraph
- Tetragraph
- Pentagraph
- Hexagraph

== Other characters ==
Other Latin characters are omitted from the tables above:

- Subscript modifier letters a, e, h-p, and r-v, and x: ₐ ₑ ₕ ᵢ ⱼ ₖ ₗ ₘ ₙ ₒ ₚ ᵣ ₛ ₜ ᵤ ᵥ ₓ (See Unicode subscripts and superscripts for full list.)
- Superscript modifier letters A-R, T-W and a-z: ᴬ ᴮ ꟲ ᴰ ᴱ ꟳ ᴳ ᴴ ᴵ ᴶ ᴷ ᴸ ᴹ ᴺ ᴼ ᴾ ꟴ ᴿ ᵀ ᵁ ⱽ ᵂ ᵃ ᵇ ᶜ ᵈ ᵉ ᶠ ᵍ ʰ ⁱ ʲ ᵏ ˡ ᵐ ⁿ ᵒ ᵖ 𐞥 ʳ ˢ ᵗ ᵘ ᵛ ʷ ˣ ʸ ᶻ (See Unicode subscripts and superscripts for full list.)
- Feminine ª and masculine º ordinal indicators
- Fullwidth forms for typesetting Latin characters in a CJK environment: Ａａ Ｂｂ Ｃｃ Ｄｄ Ｅｅ Ｆｆ Ｇｇ Ｈｈ Ｉｉ Ｊｊ Ｋｋ Ｌｌ Ｍｍ Ｎｎ Ｏｏ Ｐｐ Ｑｑ Ｒｒ Ｓｓ Ｔｔ Ｕｕ Ｖｖ Ｗｗ Ｘｘ Ｙｙ Ｚｚ
- U+0149 ŉ LATIN SMALL LETTER N PRECEDED BY APOSTROPHE. This is a legacy compatibility character for ISO/IEC 6937. It is deprecated, so separate ' and n characters should be used in its place.

== See also ==
- Latin-script multigraph
- Ligature (writing)
- Latin script in Unicode
- List of precomposed Latin characters in Unicode § Ligatures
- Phonetic symbols in Unicode
- List of Latin letters by shape
- List of Latin-script digraphs
- Category:Latin-script ligatures
- Category:Palaeographic letters
- Category:Phonetic transcription symbols
- Category:Letters with diacritics
- Category:Latin-script letters

== Sources ==
- Centre national de linguistique appliquée (CENALA) (2008), Alphabet des langues nationales béninoises (in French) (6 ed.), Cotonou: CENALA avec le concours de l’Initiative francophone pour la formation à distance des maîtres (IFADEM)
