= Latin Extended-B =

- Range: U+0180..U+024F (208 code points)
- Plane: BMP
- Scripts: Latin
- Major alphabets: Africa alphabet Americanist; Azerbaijani; Khoisan; Pan-Nigerian; Pinyin; Romanian
- Assigned: 208 code points
- Unused: 0 reserved code points

Unicode Version History
- 1.0.0 (1991): 113 (+113)
- 1.1 (1993): 148 (+35)
- 3.0 (1999): 178 (+30)
- 3.2 (2002): 179 (+1)
- 4.0 (2003): 183 (+4)
- 4.1 (2005): 194 (+11)
- 5.0 (2006): 208 (+14)

Unicode documentation
- Code chart ∣ Web page
- Note: Block range was extended by 80 code points in Unicode 1.1 during the unification with ISO 10646.

Latin Extended-B is the fourth block (0180-024F) of the Unicode Standard. It has been included since version 1.0, where it was only allocated to the code points 0180-01FF and contained 113 characters. During unification with ISO 10646 for version 1.1, the block range was extended by 80 code points and another 35 characters were assigned. In version 3.0 and later, the last 60 available code points in the block were assigned. Its block name in Unicode 1.0 was Extended Latin.

== Character table ==
Code	Glyph	Decimal	Unicode Name
Non-European and historic Latin
U+0180	ƀ	&#384;	Latin Small Letter B with Stroke
U+0181	Ɓ	&#385;	Latin Capital Letter B with Hook
U+0182	Ƃ	&#386;	Latin Capital Letter B with Top Bar
U+0183	ƃ	&#387;	Latin Small Letter B with Top Bar
U+0184	Ƅ	&#388;	Latin Capital Letter Tone Six
U+0185	ƅ	&#389;	Latin Small Letter Tone Six
U+0186	Ɔ	&#390;	Latin Capital Letter Open O
U+0187	Ƈ	&#391;	Latin Capital Letter C with Hook
U+0188	ƈ	&#392;	Latin Small Letter C with Hook
U+0189	Ɖ	&#393;	Latin Capital Letter African D
U+018A	Ɗ	&#394;	Latin Capital Letter D with Hook
U+018B	Ƌ	&#395;	Latin Capital Letter D with Top Bar
U+018C	ƌ	&#396;	Latin Small Letter D with Top Bar
U+018D	ƍ	&#397;	Latin Small Letter Turned Delta
U+018E	Ǝ	&#398;	Latin Capital Letter Reversed E
U+018F	Ə	&#399;	Latin Capital Letter Schwa
U+0190	Ɛ	&#400;	Latin Capital Letter Open E (= Latin Capital Letter Epsilon)
U+0191	Ƒ	&#401;	Latin Capital Letter F with Hook
U+0192	ƒ	&#402;	Latin Small Letter F with Hook
U+0193	Ɠ	&#403;	Latin Capital Letter G with Hook
U+0194	Ɣ	&#404;	Latin Capital Letter Gamma
U+0195	ƕ	&#405;	Latin Small Letter HV
U+0196	Ɩ	&#406;	Latin Capital Letter Iota
U+0197	Ɨ	&#407;	Latin Capital Letter I with Stroke
U+0198	Ƙ	&#408;	Latin Capital Letter K with Hook
U+0199	ƙ	&#409;	Latin Small Letter K with Hook
U+019A	ƚ	&#410;	Latin Small Letter L with Bar
U+019B	ƛ	&#411;	Latin Small Letter Lambda with Stroke
U+019C	Ɯ	&#412;	Latin Capital Letter Turned M
U+019D	Ɲ	&#413;	Latin Capital Letter N with Left Hook
U+019E	ƞ	&#414;	Latin Small Letter N with Long Right Leg
U+019F	Ɵ	&#415;	Latin Capital Letter O with Middle Tilde
U+01A0	Ơ	&#416;	Latin Capital Letter O with Horn
U+01A1	ơ	&#417;	Latin Small Letter O with Horn
U+01A2	Ƣ	&#418;	Latin Capital Letter OI (= Latin Capital Letter Gha)
U+01A3	ƣ	&#419;	Latin Small Letter OI (= Latin Small Letter Gha)
U+01A4	Ƥ	&#420;	Latin Capital Letter P with Hook
U+01A5	ƥ	&#421;	Latin Small Letter P with Hook
U+01A6	Ʀ	&#422;	Latin Letter YR
U+01A7	Ƨ	&#423;	Latin Capital Letter Tone Two
U+01A8	ƨ	&#424;	Latin Small Letter Tone Two
U+01A9	Ʃ	&#425;	Latin Capital Letter Esh
U+01AA	ƪ	&#426;	Latin Letter Reversed Esh Loop
U+01AB	ƫ	&#427;	Latin Small Letter T with Palatal Hook
U+01AC	Ƭ	&#428;	Latin Capital Letter T with Hook
U+01AD	ƭ	&#429;	Latin Small Letter T with Hook
U+01AE	Ʈ	&#430;	Latin Capital Letter T with Retroflex Hook
U+01AF	Ư	&#431;	Latin Capital Letter U with Horn
U+01B0	ư	&#432;	Latin Small Letter U with Horn
U+01B1	Ʊ	&#433;	Latin Capital Letter Upsilon
U+01B2	Ʋ	&#434;	Latin Capital Letter V with Hook
U+01B3	Ƴ	&#435;	Latin Capital Letter Y with Hook
U+01B4	ƴ	&#436;	Latin Small Letter Y with Hook
U+01B5	Ƶ	&#437;	Latin Capital Letter Z with Stroke
U+01B6	ƶ	&#438;	Latin Small Letter Z with Stroke
U+01B7	Ʒ	&#439;	Latin Capital Letter Ezh
U+01B8	Ƹ	&#440;	Latin Capital Letter Ezh Reversed
U+01B9	ƹ	&#441;	Latin Small Letter Ezh Reversed
U+01BA	ƺ	&#442;	Latin Small Letter Ezh with Tail
U+01BB	ƻ	&#443;	Latin Letter Two with Stroke
U+01BC	Ƽ	&#444;	Latin Capital Letter Tone Five
U+01BD	ƽ	&#445;	Latin Small Letter Tone Five
U+01BE	ƾ	&#446;	Latin Letter Inverted Glottal Stop with Stroke
U+01BF	ƿ	&#447;	Latin Letter Wynn
African letters for clicks
U+01C0	ǀ	&#448;	Latin Letter Dental Click
U+01C1	ǁ	&#449;	Latin Letter Lateral Click
U+01C2	ǂ	&#450;	Latin Letter Alveolar Click
U+01C3	ǃ	&#451;	Latin Letter Retroflex Click
Croatian digraphs matching Serbian Cyrillic letters
U+01C4	Ǆ	&#452;	Latin Capital Letter DZ with Caron
U+01C5	ǅ	&#453;	Latin Capital Letter D with Small Letter Z with Caron
U+01C6	ǆ	&#454;	Latin Small Letter DZ with Caron
U+01C7	Ǉ	&#455;	Latin Capital Letter LJ
U+01C8	ǈ	&#456;	Latin Capital Letter L with Small Letter J
U+01C9	ǉ	&#457;	Latin Small Letter LJ
U+01CA	Ǌ	&#458;	Latin Capital Letter NJ
U+01CB	ǋ	&#459;	Latin Capital Letter N with Small Letter J
U+01CC	ǌ	&#460;	Latin Small Letter NJ
Pinyin diacritic-vowel combinations
U+01CD	Ǎ	&#461;	Latin Capital Letter A with Caron
U+01CE	ǎ	&#462;	Latin Small Letter A with Caron
U+01CF	Ǐ	&#463;	Latin Capital Letter I with Caron
U+01D0	ǐ	&#464;	Latin Small Letter I with Caron
U+01D1	Ǒ	&#465;	Latin Capital Letter O with Caron
U+01D2	ǒ	&#466;	Latin Small Letter O with Caron
U+01D3	Ǔ	&#467;	Latin Capital Letter U with Caron
U+01D4	ǔ	&#468;	Latin Small Letter U with Caron
U+01D5	Ǖ	&#469;	Latin Capital Letter U with Diaeresis and Macron
U+01D6	ǖ	&#470;	Latin Small Letter U with Diaeresis and Macron
U+01D7	Ǘ	&#471;	Latin Capital Letter U with Diaeresis and Acute
U+01D8	ǘ	&#472;	Latin Small Letter U with Diaeresis and Acute
U+01D9	Ǚ	&#473;	Latin Capital Letter U with Diaeresis and Caron
U+01DA	ǚ	&#474;	Latin Small Letter U with Diaeresis and Caron
U+01DB	Ǜ	&#475;	Latin Capital Letter U with Diaeresis and Grave
U+01DC	ǜ	&#476;	Latin Small Letter U with Diaeresis and Grave
Phonetic and historic letters
U+01DD	ǝ	&#477;	Latin Small Letter Turned E
U+01DE	Ǟ	&#478;	Latin Capital Letter A with Diaeresis and Macron
U+01DF	ǟ	&#479;	Latin Small Letter A with Diaeresis and Macron
U+01E0	Ǡ	&#480;	Latin Capital Letter A with Dot Above and Macron
U+01E1	ǡ	&#481;	Latin Small Letter A with Dot Above and Macron
U+01E2	Ǣ	&#482;	Latin Capital Letter AE with Macron
U+01E3	ǣ	&#483;	Latin Small Letter AE with Macron
U+01E4	Ǥ	&#484;	Latin Capital Letter G with Stroke
U+01E5	ǥ	&#485;	Latin Small Letter G with Stroke
U+01E6	Ǧ	&#486;	Latin Capital Letter G with Caron
U+01E7	ǧ	&#487;	Latin Small Letter G with Caron
U+01E8	Ǩ	&#488;	Latin Capital Letter K with Caron
U+01E9	ǩ	&#489;	Latin Small Letter K with Caron
U+01EA	Ǫ	&#490;	Latin Capital Letter O with Ogonek
U+01EB	ǫ	&#491;	Latin Small Letter O with Ogonek
U+01EC	Ǭ	&#492;	Latin Capital Letter O with Ogonek and Macron (=Latin Capital Letter O with Macron and Ogonek)
U+01ED	ǭ	&#493;	Latin Small Letter O with Ogonek and Macron (=Latin Small Letter O with Macron and Ogonek)
U+01EE	Ǯ	&#494;	Latin Capital Letter Ezh with Caron
U+01EF	ǯ	&#495;	Latin Small Letter Ezh with Caron
U+01F0	ǰ	&#496;	Latin Small Letter J with Caron
U+01F1	Ǳ	&#497;	Latin Capital Letter DZ
U+01F2	ǲ	&#498;	Latin Capital Letter D with Small Letter Z
U+01F3	ǳ	&#499;	Latin Small Letter DZ
U+01F4	Ǵ	&#500;	Latin Capital Letter G with Acute
U+01F5	ǵ	&#501;	Latin Small Letter G with Acute
U+01F6	Ƕ	&#502;	Latin Capital Letter Hwair
U+01F7	Ƿ	&#503;	Latin Capital Letter Wynn
U+01F8	Ǹ	&#504;	Latin Capital Letter N with Grave
U+01F9	ǹ	&#505;	Latin Small Letter N with Grave
U+01FA	Ǻ	&#506;	Latin Capital Letter A with Ring Above and Acute
U+01FB	ǻ	&#507;	Latin Small Letter A with Ring Above and Acute
U+01FC	Ǽ	&#508;	Latin Capital Letter AE with Acute
U+01FD	ǽ	&#509;	Latin Small Letter AE with Acute
U+01FE	Ǿ	&#510;	Latin Capital Letter O with Stroke and Acute
U+01FF	ǿ	&#511;	Latin Small Letter O with Stroke and Acute
Additions for Slovenian and Croatian
U+0200	Ȁ	&#512;	Latin Capital Letter A with Double Grave
U+0201	ȁ	&#513;	Latin Small Letter A with Double Grave
U+0202	Ȃ	&#514;	Latin Capital Letter A with Inverted Breve
U+0203	ȃ	&#515;	Latin Small Letter A with Inverted Breve
U+0204	Ȅ	&#516;	Latin Capital Letter E with Double Grave
U+0205	ȅ	&#517;	Latin Small Letter E with Double Grave
U+0206	Ȇ	&#518;	Latin Capital Letter E with Inverted Breve
U+0207	ȇ	&#519;	Latin Small Letter E with Inverted Breve
U+0208	Ȉ	&#520;	Latin Capital Letter I with Double Grave
U+0209	ȉ	&#521;	Latin Small Letter I with Double Grave
U+020A	Ȋ	&#522;	Latin Capital Letter I with Inverted Breve
U+020B	ȋ	&#523;	Latin Small Letter I with Inverted Breve
U+020C	Ȍ	&#524;	Latin Capital Letter O with Double Grave
U+020D	ȍ	&#525;	Latin Small Letter O with Double Grave
U+020E	Ȏ	&#526;	Latin Capital Letter O with Inverted Breve
U+020F	ȏ	&#527;	Latin Small Letter O with Inverted Breve
U+0210	Ȑ	&#528;	Latin Capital Letter R with Double Grave
U+0211	ȑ	&#529;	Latin Small Letter R with Double Grave
U+0212	Ȓ	&#530;	Latin Capital Letter R with Inverted Breve
U+0213	ȓ	&#531;	Latin Small Letter R with Inverted Breve
U+0214	Ȕ	&#532;	Latin Capital Letter U with Double Grave
U+0215	ȕ	&#533;	Latin Small Letter U with Double Grave
U+0216	Ȗ	&#534;	Latin Capital Letter U with Inverted Breve
U+0217	ȗ	&#535;	Latin Small Letter U with Inverted Breve
Additions for Romanian
U+0218	Ș	&#536;	Latin Capital Letter S with Comma Below
U+0219	ș	&#537;	Latin Small Letter S with Comma Below
U+021A	Ț	&#538;	Latin Capital Letter T with Comma Below
U+021B	ț	&#539;	Latin Small Letter T with Comma Below
Miscellaneous additions
U+021C	Ȝ	&#540;	Latin Capital Letter Yogh
U+021D	ȝ	&#541;	Latin Small Letter Yogh
U+021E	Ȟ	&#542;	Latin Capital Letter H with Caron
U+021F	ȟ	&#543;	Latin Small Letter H with Caron
U+0220	Ƞ	&#544;	Latin Capital Letter N with Long Right Leg
U+0221	ȡ	&#545;	Latin Small Letter D with Curl
U+0222	Ȣ	&#546;	Latin Capital Letter OU
U+0223	ȣ	&#547;	Latin Small Letter OU
U+0224	Ȥ	&#548;	Latin Capital Letter Z with Hook
U+0225	ȥ	&#549;	Latin Small Letter Z with Hook
U+0226	Ȧ	&#550;	Latin Capital Letter A with Dot Above
U+0227	ȧ	&#551;	Latin Small Letter A with Dot Above
U+0228	Ȩ	&#552;	Latin Capital Letter E with Cedilla
U+0229	ȩ	&#553;	Latin Small Letter E with Cedilla
Additions for Livonian
U+022A	Ȫ	&#554;	Latin Capital Letter O with Diaeresis and Macron
U+022B	ȫ	&#555;	Latin Small Letter O with Diaeresis and Macron
U+022C	Ȭ	&#556;	Latin Capital Letter O with Tilde and Macron
U+022D	ȭ	&#557;	Latin Small Letter O with Tilde and Macron
U+022E	Ȯ	&#558;	Latin Capital Letter O with Dot Above
U+022F	ȯ	&#559;	Latin Small Letter O with Dot Above
U+0230	Ȱ	&#560;	Latin Capital Letter O with Dot Above and Macron
U+0231	ȱ	&#561;	Latin Small Letter O with Dot Above and Macron
U+0232	Ȳ	&#562;	Latin Capital Letter Y with Macron
U+0233	ȳ	&#563;	Latin Small Letter Y with Macron
Additions for Sinology
U+0234	ȴ	&#564;	Latin Small Letter L with Curl
U+0235	ȵ	&#565;	Latin Small Letter N with Curl
U+0236	ȶ	&#566;	Latin Small Letter T with Curl
Miscellaneous addition
U+0237	ȷ	&#567;	Latin Small Letter Dotless J
Additions for Africanist linguistics
U+0238	ȸ	&#568;	Latin Small Letter DB Digraph
U+0239	ȹ	&#569;	Latin Small Letter QP Digraph
Additions for Sencoten
U+023A	Ⱥ	&#570;	Latin Capital Letter A with Stroke
U+023B	Ȼ	&#571;	Latin Capital Letter C with Stroke
U+023C	ȼ	&#572;	Latin Small Letter C with Stroke
U+023D	Ƚ	&#573;	Latin Capital Letter L with Bar
U+023E	Ⱦ	&#574;	Latin Capital Letter T with Diagonal Stroke
Additions for Africanist linguistics
U+023F	ȿ	&#575;	Latin Small Letter S with Swash Tail
U+0240	ɀ	&#576;	Latin Small Letter Z with Swash Tail
Miscellaneous additions
U+0241	Ɂ	&#577;	Latin Capital Letter Glottal Stop
U+0242	ɂ	&#578;	Latin Small Letter Glottal Stop
U+0243	Ƀ	&#579;	Latin Capital Letter B with Stroke
U+0244	Ʉ	&#580;	Latin Capital Letter U Bar
U+0245	Ʌ	&#581;	Latin Capital Letter Turned V
U+0246	Ɇ	&#582;	Latin Capital Letter E with Stroke
U+0247	ɇ	&#583;	Latin Small Letter E with Stroke
U+0248	Ɉ	&#584;	Latin Capital Letter J with Stroke
U+0249	ɉ	&#585;	Latin Small Letter J with Stroke
U+024A	Ɋ	&#586;	Latin Capital Letter Q with Hook Tail
U+024B	ɋ	&#587;	Latin Small Letter Q with Hook Tail
U+024C	Ɍ	&#588;	Latin Capital Letter R with Stroke
U+024D	ɍ	&#589;	Latin Small Letter R with Stroke
U+024E	Ɏ	&#590;	Latin Capital Letter Y with Stroke
U+024F	ɏ	&#591;	Latin Small Letter Y with Stroke

== Subheadings ==
The Latin Extended-B block contains ten subheadings for groups of characters: Non-European and historic Latin, African letters for clicks, Croatian digraphs matching Serbian Cyrillic letters, Pinyin diacritic-vowel combinations, Phonetic and historic letters, Additions for Slovenian and Croatian, Additions for Romanian, Miscellaneous additions, Additions for Livonian, and Additions for Sinology. The Non-European and historic, African clicks, Croatian digraphs, Pinyin, and the first part of the Phonetic and historic letters were present in Unicode 1.0; additional Phonetic and historic letters were added for version 3.0; and other Phonetic and historic, as well as the rest of the sub-blocks were the characters added for version 1.1.

=== Non-European and historic Latin ===
The Non-European and historic Latin subheading contains the first 64 characters of the block, and includes various variant letters for use in Zhuang, Americanist phonetic transcription, African languages, and other Latin script alphabets. It does not contain any standard letters with diacritics.

=== African letters for clicks ===
The four African letters for clicks are used in Khoisan orthography.

=== Croatian digraphs matching Serbian Cyrillic letters ===
The Croatian digraphs matching Serbian Cyrillic letters are three sets of three case mappings (lower case, upper case, and title case) of Latin digraphs used for compatibility with Cyrillic texts, Serbo-Croatian being a digraphic language.

=== Pinyin diacritic-vowel combinations ===
The 16 Pinyin diacritic-vowel combinations are used to represent the standard Mandarin Chinese vowel sounds with tone marks.

=== Phonetic and historic letters ===
The 35 Phonetic and historic letters are largely various standard and variant Latin letters with diacritic marks.

=== Additions for Slovenian and Croatian ===
The 24 Additions for Slovenian and Croatian are all standard Latin letters with unusual diacritics, like the double grave and inverted breve.

=== Additions for Romanian ===
The Additions for Romanian are 4 characters that were erroneously unified as having a cedilla, when they have a comma below. The conflation of S and T with cedilla vs. comma below continues to plague Romanian language implementation up to the present.

=== Miscellaneous additions ===
The Miscellaneous additions subheading contains 39 characters of various description and origin.

=== Additions for Livonian ===
The Additions for Livonian are 10 letters with diacritics for writing the Livonian language.

=== Additions for Sinology ===
The Additions for Sinology are three lowercase letters with curls used in the study of classical Chinese language.

=== Additions for Africanist linguistics ===
The Additions for Africanist linguistics are two lowercase letter with swash tails used in Africanist linguistics.

=== Additions for Sencoten ===
The Additions for Sencoten are 5 letters with strokes for writing Saanich.

== Number of letters ==
The following table shows the number of letters in the Latin Extended-B block.

Type of subheading	Number of symbols	Range of characters
Non-European and historic Latin	64 various letters for use in Zhuang, Americanist phonetic transcription, African languages, and other Latin script alphabets.	U+0180 to U+01BF
African letters for clicks	Four African letters for clicks are used in Khoisan orthography.	U+01C0 to U+01C3
Croatian digraphs matching Serbian Cyrillic letters	Three sets of three case mappings (lower case, upper case, and title case) of Latin digraphs used for compatibility with Cyrillic texts.	U+01C4 to U+01CC
Pinyin diacritic-vowel combinations	Sixteen diacritic-vowel combinations which are used to represent the standard Mandarin Chinese vowel sounds with tone marks.	U+01CD to U+01DC
Phonetic and historic letters	35 Phonetic and historic letters which are largely various standard and variant Latin letters with diacritic marks.	U+01DD to U+01FF
Additions for Slovenian and Croatian	24 Additions for Slovenian and Croatian are all standard Latin letters with unusual diacritics, like the double grave and inverted breve.	U+0200 to U+0217
Additions for Romanian	4 characters that were erroneously unified as having a cedilla, when they have a comma below.	U+0218 to U+021B
Miscellaneous additions	14 characters of various description and origin.	U+021C to U+0229
Additions for Livonian	10 letters with diacritics for writing the Livonian language.	U+022A to U+0233
Additions for Sinology	Three lowercase letters with curls used in the study of classical Chinese language.	U+0234 to U+0236

== Compact table ==
Latin Extended-B^{[1]} Official Unicode Consortium code chart (PDF)
	0	1	2	3	4	5	6	7	8	9	A	B	C	D	E	F
U+018x	ƀ	Ɓ	Ƃ	ƃ	Ƅ	ƅ	Ɔ	Ƈ	ƈ	Ɖ	Ɗ	Ƌ	ƌ	ƍ	Ǝ	Ə
U+019x	Ɛ	Ƒ	ƒ	Ɠ	Ɣ	ƕ	Ɩ	Ɨ	Ƙ	ƙ	ƚ	ƛ	Ɯ	Ɲ	ƞ	Ɵ
U+01Ax	Ơ	ơ	Ƣ	ƣ	Ƥ	ƥ	Ʀ	Ƨ	ƨ	Ʃ	ƪ	ƫ	Ƭ	ƭ	Ʈ	Ư
U+01Bx	ư	Ʊ	Ʋ	Ƴ	ƴ	Ƶ	ƶ	Ʒ	Ƹ	ƹ	ƺ	ƻ	Ƽ	ƽ	ƾ	ƿ
U+01Cx	ǀ	ǁ	ǂ	ǃ	Ǆ	ǅ	ǆ	Ǉ	ǈ	ǉ	Ǌ	ǋ	ǌ	Ǎ	ǎ	Ǐ
U+01Dx	ǐ	Ǒ	ǒ	Ǔ	ǔ	Ǖ	ǖ	Ǘ	ǘ	Ǚ	ǚ	Ǜ	ǜ	ǝ	Ǟ	ǟ
U+01Ex	Ǡ	ǡ	Ǣ	ǣ	Ǥ	ǥ	Ǧ	ǧ	Ǩ	ǩ	Ǫ	ǫ	Ǭ	ǭ	Ǯ	ǯ
U+01Fx	ǰ	Ǳ	ǲ	ǳ	Ǵ	ǵ	Ƕ	Ƿ	Ǹ	ǹ	Ǻ	ǻ	Ǽ	ǽ	Ǿ	ǿ
U+020x	Ȁ	ȁ	Ȃ	ȃ	Ȅ	ȅ	Ȇ	ȇ	Ȉ	ȉ	Ȋ	ȋ	Ȍ	ȍ	Ȏ	ȏ
U+021x	Ȑ	ȑ	Ȓ	ȓ	Ȕ	ȕ	Ȗ	ȗ	Ș	ș	Ț	ț	Ȝ	ȝ	Ȟ	ȟ
U+022x	Ƞ	ȡ	Ȣ	ȣ	Ȥ	ȥ	Ȧ	ȧ	Ȩ	ȩ	Ȫ	ȫ	Ȭ	ȭ	Ȯ	ȯ
U+023x	Ȱ	ȱ	Ȳ	ȳ	ȴ	ȵ	ȶ	ȷ	ȸ	ȹ	Ⱥ	Ȼ	ȼ	Ƚ	Ⱦ	ȿ
U+024x	ɀ	Ɂ	ɂ	Ƀ	Ʉ	Ʌ	Ɇ	ɇ	Ɉ	ɉ	Ɋ	ɋ	Ɍ	ɍ	Ɏ	ɏ
Notes 1.As of Unicode version 17.0

== History ==
The following Unicode-related documents record the purpose and process of defining specific characters in the Latin Extended-B block:

Version	Final code points (Note: Proposed code points and characters names may differ from final code points and names)	Count	UTC ID	L2 ID	WG2 ID	Document
1.0.0	U+0180..01EF	112				(to be determined)
1.0.0	U+0180..01EF	112		X3L2/94-077	N994	Davis, Mark (1994-03-03), ISO/IEC 10646-1 - Proposed Draft Corrigendum 1
1.0.0	U+0180..01EF	112		X3L2/94-098	N1033 (pdf, doc)	Umamaheswaran, V. S.; Ksar, Mike (1994-06-01), "8.1.15", Unconfirmed Minutes of ISO/IEC JTC 1/SC 2/WG 2 Meeting 25, Falez Hotel, Antalya, Turkey, 1994-04-18--22
1.0.0	U+0180..01EF	112			N1105	Everson, Michael (1994-10-11), Defect Report - Character names in Latin Extended-B
1.0.0	U+0180..01EF	112			N1162	Everson, Michael (1995-03-10), Input document to WG2 N 1105 (Defect Report - Character names in Latin Extended-B
1.0.0	U+0180..01EF	112		L2/04-399	N2859	LaBonté, Alain (2004-10-19), Correcting reference glyph for U+01B3 LATIN CAPITAL LETTER Y WITH HOOK
1.0.0	U+0180..01EF	112		L2/05-137		Freytag, Asmus (2005-05-10), Handling "defective" names
1.0.0	U+0180..01EF	112		L2/05-108R		Moore, Lisa (2005-08-26), "Consensus 103-C7", UTC #103 Minutes, "Create a "Normative Name Alias" property and file in the UCD. Populate the property with names from the sections "Typos" and "Bad or misleading names" from document L2/05-137."
1.0.0	U+0180..01EF	112		L2/06-157		McGowan, Rick (2006-05-12), "Proposed Additional Name Aliases (BETA FEEDBACK) [U+01A2, U+01A2]", Comments on Public Review Issues (January 31, 2006 - May 12, 2006)
1.0.0	U+0180..01EF	112		L2/06-108		Moore, Lisa (2006-05-25), "B.11.10 [U+01A2, U+01A2]", UTC #107 Minutes
1.0.0	U+0180..01EF	112		L2/19-201		Zhong, Juechen (2019-05-14), Proposal to correct LATIN SMALL LETTER TONE SIX (U+0185)
1.0.0	U+0180..01EF	112		L2/19-286		Anderson, Deborah; Whistler, Ken; Pournader, Roozbeh; Moore, Lisa; Liang, Hai (2019-07-22), "a. LATIN SMALL LETTER TONE SIX", Recommendations to UTC #160 July 2019 on Script Proposals
1.0.0	U+0180..01EF	112		L2/21-083		Jiang, Kushim (2021-02-03), Proposal to provide the glyphs of Latin letter tone six
1.0.0	U+0180..01EF	112		L2/21-073		Anderson, Deborah; Whistler, Ken; Pournader, Roozbeh; Moore, Lisa; Liang, Hai (2021-04-23), "1a. Latin Letter Tone Six", Recommendations to UTC #167 April 2021 on Script Proposals
1.0.0	U+01F0	1	UTC/1991-047			Becker, Joe, Extended Latin, Standard Phonetic, Modifier Letters, General Diacritical Marks, Greek, Cyrillic
1.0.0	U+01F0	1	UTC/1991-048B			Whistler, Ken (1991-03-27), "IPA additions", Draft Minutes from the UTC meeting #46 day 2, 3/27 at Apple
1.1	U+01F1..01F5, 01FA..0217	35				(to be determined)
1.1	U+01F1..01F5, 01FA..0217	35		X3L2/94-077	N994	Davis, Mark (1994-03-03), ISO/IEC 10646-1 - Proposed Draft Corrigendum 1
1.1	U+01F1..01F5, 01FA..0217	35		X3L2/94-098	N1033 (pdf, doc)	Umamaheswaran, V. S.; Ksar, Mike (1994-06-01), "8.1.15", Unconfirmed Minutes of ISO/IEC JTC 1/SC 2/WG 2 Meeting 25, Falez Hotel, Antalya, Turkey, 1994-04-18--22
3.0	U+01F6..01F7, 021C..021D	4			N1166	Everson, Michael (1995-03-10), Proposal Summary for HWAIR and WYNN
3.0	U+01F6..01F7, 021C..021D	4		L2/97-117	N1547	Everson, Michael (1997-04-14), Reminder about 4 medieval English Latin characters
3.0	U+01F6..01F7, 021C..021D	4		L2/97-119	N1549	Everson, Michael (1997-04-20), On the derivation of YOGH and EZH
3.0	U+01F6..01F7, 021C..021D	4		L2/97-288	N1603	Umamaheswaran, V. S. (1997-10-24), "8.19", Unconfirmed Meeting Minutes, WG 2 Meeting # 33, Heraklion, Crete, Greece, 20 June – 4 July 1997
3.0	U+01F6..01F7, 021C..021D	4		L2/98-004R	N1681	Text of ISO 10646 – AMD 18 for PDAM registration and FPDAM ballot, 1997-12-22
3.0	U+01F6..01F7, 021C..021D	4		L2/98-318	N1894	Revised text of 10646-1/FPDAM 18, AMENDMENT 18: Symbols and Others, 1998-10-22
3.0	U+01F8..01F9	2		X3L2/95-112	N1282	Two Pinyin letters with Tone Mark missing, 1995-11-07
3.0	U+01F8..01F9	2			N1303 (html, doc)	Umamaheswaran, V. S.; Ksar, Mike (1996-01-26), "8.12 Missing Pinyin characters", Minutes of Meeting 29, Tokyo
3.0	U+01F8..01F9	2		X3L2/96-033	N1355	Suignard, Michel (1996-04-17), US response to WG 2 resolution 29.10 at the meeting in Tokyo
3.0	U+01F8..01F9	2			N1353	Umamaheswaran, V. S.; Ksar, Mike (1996-06-25), "8.10", Draft minutes of WG2 Copenhagen Meeting # 30
3.0	U+01F8..01F9	2			N1461	Pinyin proposal summary form, 1996-08-15
3.0	U+01F8..01F9	2			N1453	Ksar, Mike; Umamaheswaran, V. S. (1996-12-06), "8.3.4", WG 2 Minutes - Quebec Meeting 31
3.0	U+01F8..01F9	2	UTC/1996-xxx			Greenfield, Steve (1996-12-13), "Motion #70-6", Action Items & Resolutions Generated at UTC #70
3.0	U+01F8..01F9	2		L2/98-004R	N1681	Text of ISO 10646 – AMD 18 for PDAM registration and FPDAM ballot, 1997-12-22
3.0	U+01F8..01F9	2		L2/98-318	N1894	Revised text of 10646-1/FPDAM 18, AMENDMENT 18: Symbols and Others, 1998-10-22
3.0	U+0218..021B	4	UTC/1991-048B			Whistler, Ken (1991-03-27), "7 Add Roman S cedilla, Roman S comma to extended Latin", Draft Minutes from the UTC meeting #46 day 2, 3/27 at Apple
3.0	U+0218..021B	4		X3L2/96-053	N1361	Proposal for addition of Latin characters, 1995-04-22
3.0	U+0218..021B	4			N1353	Umamaheswaran, V. S.; Ksar, Mike (1996-06-25), "8.2.3", Draft minutes of WG2 Copenhagen Meeting # 30
3.0	U+0218..021B	4	UTC/1996-027.2			Greenfield, Steve (1996-07-01), "I. Additional Latin Characters", UTC #69 Minutes (PART 2)
3.0	U+0218..021B	4			N1440	Confirmation of request for 4 additional Latin characters used in Romania - reference document WG2 N 1361, 1996-07-09
3.0	U+0218..021B	4		X3L2/96-109	N1507	Suignard, Michel (1996-12-06), Comment on Romanian issues concerning characters S and T with Cedilla/Comma
3.0	U+0218..021B	4			N1453	Ksar, Mike; Umamaheswaran, V. S. (1996-12-06), "8.3.1 Four Romanian characters", WG 2 Minutes - Quebec Meeting 31
3.0	U+0218..021B	4		X3L2/96-123		Aliprand, Joan; Winkler, Arnold (1996-12-18), "4.6 Romanian", Preliminary Minutes - UTC #71 & X3L2 #168 ad hoc meeting, San Diego - December 5-6, 1996
3.0	U+0218..021B	4		L2/97-030	N1503 (pdf, doc)	Umamaheswaran, V. S.; Ksar, Mike (1997-04-01), "8.11 Romanian - 4 additional characters", Unconfirmed Minutes of WG 2 Meeting #32, Singapore; 1997-01-20--24
3.0	U+0218..021B	4		L2/97-288	N1603	Umamaheswaran, V. S. (1997-10-24), "8.24.5", Unconfirmed Meeting Minutes, WG 2 Meeting # 33, Heraklion, Crete, Greece, 20 June – 4 July 1997
3.0	U+0218..021B	4		L2/98-004R	N1681	Text of ISO 10646 – AMD 18 for PDAM registration and FPDAM ballot, 1997-12-22
3.0	U+0218..021B	4		L2/98-318	N1894	Revised text of 10646-1/FPDAM 18, AMENDMENT 18: Symbols and Others, 1998-10-22
3.0	U+0218..021B	4		L2/99-010	N1903 (pdf, html, doc)	Umamaheswaran, V. S. (1998-12-30), Minutes of WG 2 meeting 35, London, U.K.; 1998-09-21--25
3.0	U+021E..021F	2		L2/97-164		Proposal to add 2 Latin characters, 1997-07-01
3.0	U+021E..021F	2		L2/98-062	N1619	Kolehmainen, Erkki I.; Ruppel, Klaas (1997-07-01), Proposal to add 2 Latin Characters to ISO/IEC 10646
3.0	U+021E..021F	2		L2/98-070		Aliprand, Joan; Winkler, Arnold, "4.C.3", Minutes of the joint UTC and L2 meeting from the meeting in Cupertino, February 25-27, 1998
3.0	U+021E..021F	2		L2/98-286	N1703	Umamaheswaran, V. S.; Ksar, Mike (1998-07-02), "8.3", Unconfirmed Meeting Minutes, WG 2 Meeting #34, Redmond, WA, USA; 1998-03-16--20
3.0	U+021E..021F	2		L2/98-321	N1905	Revised text of 10646-1/FPDAM 23, AMENDMENT 23: Bopomofo Extended and other characters, 1998-10-22
3.0	U+0222..0225	4		L2/98-208	N1741	Everson, Michael (1998-05-25), Additional Latin characters for the UCS
3.0	U+0222..0225	4		L2/98-281R (pdf, html)		Aliprand, Joan (1998-07-31), "Additional Latin Characters (IV.C.1)", Unconfirmed Minutes – UTC #77 & NCITS Subgroup L2 # 174 JOINT MEETING, Redmond, WA -- July 29-31, 1998
3.0	U+0222..0225	4		L2/98-292R (pdf, html, Figure 1)		"2.1", Comments on proposals to add characters from ISO standards developed by ISO/TC 46/SC 4, 1998-08-19
3.0	U+0222..0225	4		L2/98-292	N1840	"2.1", Comments on proposals to add characters from ISO standards developed by ISO/TC 46/SC 4, 1998-08-25
3.0	U+0222..0225	4		L2/98-293	N1885	"2.1", Comments on proposals to add various characters to ISO/IEC 10646, 1998-08-25
3.0	U+0222..0225	4		L2/98-301	N1847	Everson, Michael (1998-09-12), Responses to NCITS/L2 and Unicode Consortium comments on numerous proposals
3.0	U+0222..0225	4		L2/98-372	N1884R2 (pdf, doc)	Whistler, Ken; et al. (1998-09-22), Additional Characters for the UCS
3.0	U+0222..0225	4		L2/98-329	N1920	Combined PDAM registration and consideration ballot on WD for ISO/IEC 10646-1/Amd. 30, AMENDMENT 30: Additional Latin and other characters, 1998-10-28
3.0	U+0222..0225	4		L2/99-010	N1903 (pdf, html, doc)	Umamaheswaran, V. S. (1998-12-30), "8.1.5.1", Minutes of WG 2 meeting 35, London, U.K.; 1998-09-21--25
3.0	U+0226..0229	4		L2/98-357	N1838 (html, doc)	Davis, Mark (1998-09-15), Proposal to add four binary completion letters to the BMP
3.0	U+0226..0229	4		L2/98-329	N1920	Combined PDAM registration and consideration ballot on WD for ISO/IEC 10646-1/Amd. 30, AMENDMENT 30: Additional Latin and other characters, 1998-10-28
3.0	U+0226..0229	4		L2/99-010	N1903 (pdf, html, doc)	Umamaheswaran, V. S. (1998-12-30), "8.2.3", Minutes of WG 2 meeting 35, London, U.K.; 1998-09-21--25
3.0	U+022A..0233	10		X3L2/95-126	N1322	Everson, Michael; Ruppel, Klaas; Mētra, Imants (1995-11-01), Proposal for addition of Latin characters for Livonian
3.0	U+022A..0233	10			N1353	Umamaheswaran, V. S.; Ksar, Mike (1996-06-25), "8.2.1", Draft minutes of WG2 Copenhagen Meeting # 30
3.0	U+022A..0233	10			N1453	Ksar, Mike; Umamaheswaran, V. S. (1996-12-06), "8.3.2 Livonian characters", WG 2 Minutes - Quebec Meeting 31
3.0	U+022A..0233	10		L2/98-375	N1888	Blumberga, G. (1998-09-11), On inclusion of additional Livonian characters in the UCS
3.0	U+022A..0233	10		L2/98-329	N1920	Combined PDAM registration and consideration ballot on WD for ISO/IEC 10646-1/Amd. 30, AMENDMENT 30: Additional Latin and other characters, 1998-10-28
3.0	U+022A..0233	10		L2/99-010	N1903 (pdf, html, doc)	Umamaheswaran, V. S. (1998-12-30), "8.1.5.2", Minutes of WG 2 meeting 35, London, U.K.; 1998-09-21--25
3.2	U+0220	1		L2/00-423	N2306R	Everson, Michael (2000-11-29), Proposal to add LATIN CAPITAL LETTER N WITH LONG RIGHT LEG to the UCS
3.2	U+0220	1		L2/01-012R		Moore, Lisa (2001-05-21), "Motion 86-M31", Minutes UTC #86 in Mountain View, Jan 2001, "Accept the addition of the character LATIN CAPITAL LETTER N WITH LONG RIGHT LEG at U+0220."
3.2	U+0220	1		L2/01-344	N2353 (pdf, doc)	Umamaheswaran, V. S. (2001-09-09), "7.3", Minutes from SC2/WG2 meeting #40 -- Mountain View, April 2001
4.0	U+0221, 0234..0236	4		L2/01-272	N2366	Cook, Richard; Everson, Michael (2001-07-02), Proposal to add five phonetic characters to the UCS
4.0	U+0221, 0234..0236	4		L2/01-295R		Moore, Lisa (2001-11-06), Minutes from the UTC/L2 meeting #88
4.0	U+0221, 0234..0236	4		L2/01-347	N2366R	Cook, Richard; Everson, Michael (2001-09-20), Proposal to add six phonetic characters to the UCS
4.0	U+0221, 0234..0236	4		L2/01-420		Whistler, Ken (2001-10-30), "c. Phonetic letter additions", WG2 (Singapore) Resolution Consent Docket for UTC
4.0	U+0221, 0234..0236	4		L2/01-405R		Moore, Lisa (2001-12-12), "Consensus 89-C22", Minutes from the UTC/L2 meeting in Mountain View, November 6-9, 2001
4.0	U+0221, 0234..0236	4		L2/02-154	N2403	Umamaheswaran, V. S. (2002-04-22), Draft minutes of WG 2 meeting 41, Hotel Phoenix, Singapore, 2001-10-15/19
4.1	U+0237	1		L2/03-194	N2590	Freytag, Asmus (2003-06-09), Additional Mathematical and Letterlike Characters
4.1	U+0238..0239, 023C	3		L2/03-190R		Constable, Peter (2003-06-08), Proposal to Encode Additional Phonetic Symbols in the UCS
4.1	U+0238..0239, 023C	3		L2/04-047		Constable, Peter (2004-02-01), Revised Proposal to Encode Additional Phonetic Symbols in the UCS
4.1	U+0238..0239, 023C	3		L2/04-132	N2740	Constable, Peter (2004-04-19), Proposal to add additional phonetic characters to the UCS
4.1	U+0238..0239, 023C	3		L2/04-145		Starner, David (2004-04-30), C with stroke character examples from BAE report 1884 (Dorsey)
4.1	U+0238..0239, 023C	3		L2/04-003R		Moore, Lisa (2004-05-17), "Additional Phonetic Symbols (B.14.13)", UTC #98 Minutes
4.1	U+0238..0239, 023C	3		L2/04-173		McGowan, Rick (2004-05-28), "35", Comments on Public Review Issues (Feb 5 - May 28, 2004)
4.1	U+0238..0239, 023C	3		L2/04-202		Anderson, Deborah (2004-06-07), Slashed C Feedback
4.1	U+0238..0239, 023C	3		L2/04-156R2		Moore, Lisa (2004-08-13), "SENĆOŦEN Latin characters (A.19) and Encoding LATIN SMALL LETTER C WITH STROKE (C.12.11)", UTC #99 Minutes
4.1	U+023A..023B, 023D..023E	4		L2/04-170	N2784R	Elliot, John; Brand, Peter; Harvey, Chris (2004-05-05), Proposal to Add Four SENĆOŦEN Latin Charaters [sic]
4.1	U+023A..023B, 023D..023E	4		L2/04-182		Anderson, Deborah (2004-06-03), Message in support of SENCOTEN proposal
4.1	U+023A..023B, 023D..023E	4		L2/04-211		Anderson, Deborah (2004-06-07), Further Information on SENCOTEN
4.1	U+023A..023B, 023D..023E	4		L2/04-156R2		Moore, Lisa (2004-08-13), "SENĆOŦEN Latin characters (A.19)", UTC #99 Minutes
4.1	U+023F..0240	2		L2/03-190R		Constable, Peter (2003-06-08), Proposal to Encode Additional Phonetic Symbols in the UCS
4.1	U+023F..0240	2		L2/04-242	N2799	Everson, Michael; Constable, Peter (2004-06-12), Proposal to add two Africanist phonetic characters
4.1	U+0241	1		L2/04-065		Constable, Peter (2004-02-01), Proposal to Encode Orthographic Glottal Stops in the UCS
4.1	U+0241	1		L2/04-224	N2789	Kew, Jonathan; Constable, Peter (2004-06-08), Revised Proposal to Encode Orthographic Glottal Stops in the UCS
4.1	U+0241	1		L2/05-072		Constable, Peter (2005-02-09), Case mapping and glottal stops
5.0	U+0242	1		L2/04-065		Constable, Peter (2004-02-01), Proposal to Encode Orthographic Glottal Stops in the UCS
5.0	U+0242	1		L2/05-057		Constable, Peter (2005-02-02), Proposed Principles for Character Disunifications
5.0	U+0242	1		L2/05-076		Davis, Mark (2005-02-10), Stability of Case Folding
5.0	U+0242	1		L2/05-224		Priest, Lorna (2005-08-08), Letter in Support of L2/05-194
5.0	U+0242	1		L2/05-194R	N2962R	Everson, Michael; Harvey, Chris (2005-08-10), Proposal to add LATIN SMALL LETTER GLOTTAL STOP to the UCS
5.0	U+0242	1			N2942	Freytag, Asmus; Whistler, Ken (2005-08-12), Proposal to add nine lowercase characters
5.0	U+0242	1		L2/05-180		Moore, Lisa (2005-08-17), "C.16", UTC #104 Minutes
5.0	U+0242	1		L2/05-108R		Moore, Lisa (2005-08-26), "Stability of Case Folding (B.14.2)", UTC #103 Minutes
5.0	U+0242	1			N2953 (pdf, doc)	Umamaheswaran, V. S. (2006-02-16), "8.2.2", Unconfirmed minutes of WG 2 meeting 47, Sophia Antipolis, France; 2005-09-12/15
5.0	U+0243..024F	13		L2/04-246R		Priest, Lorna (2004-07-26), Revised Proposal for Additional Latin Phonetic and Orthographic Characters
5.0	U+0243..024F	13		L2/04-316		Moore, Lisa (2004-08-19), "C.6", UTC #100 Minutes
5.0	U+0243..024F	13		L2/04-348	N2906	Priest, Lorna (2004-08-23), Revised Proposal for Additional Latin Phonetic and Orthographic Characters
5.0	U+0243..024F	13			N2953 (pdf, doc)	Umamaheswaran, V. S. (2006-02-16), "M47.5a", Unconfirmed minutes of WG 2 meeting 47, Sophia Antipolis, France; 2005-09-12/15

== See also ==
- Phonetic symbols in Unicode
