= Case variants of IPA letters =

International Phonetic Alphabet variants

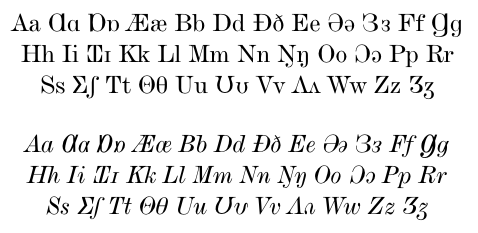
Capital variants of the IPA letters used in English, as designed by Michael Everson.

With the adoption of letters from the International Phonetic Alphabet (IPA) in various national alphabets, letter case forms have been developed. This usually means capital (uppercase) forms were developed, but in the case of the glottal stop ʔ and pharyngeal ʕ, both uppercase ⟨Ɂ⟩, ⟨꟎⟩ and lowercase ⟨ɂ⟩, ⟨꟏⟩ were created for languages in which they have case, because in most orthographies that use these letters they are unicameral, and for these orthographies the original IPA letters ʔ, ʕ are used.

The adoption of IPA letters has been particularly notable in Sub-Saharan Africa, largely due to the Africa Alphabet. In languages such as Hausa, Fula, Akan, Gbe languages, Manding languages, and Lingala, casing pairs of IPA letters such as open o ⟨Ɔ ɔ⟩, open e ⟨Ɛ ɛ⟩, and eng ⟨Ŋ ŋ⟩ are found, but others occur. Kabiyé of northern Togo, for example, has ⟨Ɔ ɔ, Ɛ ɛ, Ɖ ɖ, Ŋ ŋ, Ɣ ɣ, Ʊ ʊ⟩ (or ⟨Ʋ ʋ⟩), as in this newspaper headline:

MBƱ AJƐYA KIGBƐNDƱƱ ŊGBƐYƐ KEDIƔZAƔ SƆSƆƆ TƆM SE.

Some of the IPA letters that were adopted into language orthographies have since become obsolete in the IPA itself.

== Chart ==
The chart below provides IPA letters (other than those of the English alphabet) and their capital forms. Two of these capitals have distinct lowercase forms, because the IPA letters (ʔ and ʕ) are unicameral in some orthographies and bicameral in others.

Sources may differ in the graphic form of the capital letter; where these are corresponding characters in Unicode, only one will be encoded as a casing pair with the IPA letter. If casing is to be maintained, the other form will need to be accessed as a character variant in the font rather than through the dedicated Unicode character.

IPA letter	Capital	
IPA letter	(Unicode casing pair)	(Non-Unicode casing pairs and notes)
ɑ	Ɑ	
ɒ	Ɒ	
ɐ	Ɐ	
æ	Æ	
ɓ	Ɓ	Ƃ (capital of ƃ or font variant of Ɓ)
ꞵ	Ꞵ	(Greek β is more often used in IPA)
ç	Ç	
ð	Ð	
ɖ	Ɖ	Ɗ (capital of ɗ or font variant of Ɖ)
ɗ	Ɗ	Ъ (font variant)
ᶑ		(in PUA or non-Unicode font)
ɘ		Ǝ (capital of non-IPA ǝ)
ə	Ə	Ǝ (capital of non-IPA ǝ)
ɛ	Ɛ	
ɜ	Ɜ	
ɞ		𐐚 (capital of 𐑂; may not be a good match, depending on the font)
ɡ	Ɡ	
ɠ	Ɠ	
ɣ	Ɣ	
ɤ	Ɤ	
ħ	Ħ	
ɦ	Ɦ	Ĥ (capital of ĥ, used in Nawdm)
ɥ	Ɥ	
ɨ	Ɨ	
ɪ	Ɪ	Ɨ (capital of ɨ, used in ISO 6438)
ʝ	Ʝ	
ɟ		Ɉ (capital of ɉ); Ⅎ (capital of Claudian ⅎ)
ɫ	Ɫ	
ɬ	Ɬ	
ʎ		Ꟛ (capital of ꟛ)
ɱ	Ɱ	
ɯ	Ɯ	
ŋ	Ŋ	The capital has multiple forms, according to the font. Some fonts allow the user to select the capital form.
ɲ	Ɲ	The capital has multiple forms, according to the font. Some fonts allow the user to select the capital form.
ø	Ø	
ɵ	Ɵ	
ɔ	Ɔ	
œ	Œ	
ɽ	Ɽ	
ʀ	Ʀ	
ʂ	Ʂ	
ʃ	Ʃ	
ʈ	Ʈ	Ŧ (capital of ŧ)
ʉ	Ʉ	
ʊ	Ʊ	
ʋ	Ʋ	
ʌ	Ʌ	
ꭓ	Ꭓ	(Greek χ is more often used in IPA)
ʒ	Ʒ	Ʃ (font variant, e.g. Gentium and DejaVu Serif)
θ	Θ, ϴ	(Both are assigned as the capital of Greek theta. Latin theta is not supported by Unicode.)
ɸ		Φ (capital of Greek φ)
ʔ	(non-casing)	Ɂ (lowercase: ɂ)
ʕ	(non-casing)	꟎ (lowercase: ꟏)

Capitals of obsolete IPA symbols are:

IPA	Capital	
ƈ	Ƈ	
ꞔ	Ꞔ	
ʚ		Ꞝ (capital of ꞝ) or 𐐂 (capital of 𐐪); may not be good matches, depending on font
ǥ	Ǥ	(the lowercase was an open-tail variant)
ƕ	Ƕ	
ɩ	Ɩ	
ƙ	Ƙ	
ʞ	Ʞ	
ƞ	Ƞ	
ƥ	Ƥ	
ɼ	꟢	Γ (capital of Greek γ or font variant of ꟢)
ƭ	Ƭ	
ʇ	Ʇ	
ɷ	꟝	
ᶎ	Ᶎ	

For some IPA letters that do not have Unicode-supported capitals, there may be a mathematical symbol or letter in a non-Latin script that coincidentally resembles the expected capital letter. However, it is unlikely such pairings will work reliably across fonts. Examples are:

- ⟨ʗ⟩: complement symbol ⟨∁⟩ (not always distinct from ⟨C⟩)
- ⟨ɟ⟩: Lisu letter ⟨ꓞ⟩ (Tsha)
- ⟨ᵷ⟩: sans-serif ⟨⅁⟩
- ⟨ɾ⟩: Lisu letter ⟨ꓩ⟩ (Fa)
- ⟨ɰ⟩: old Abkhaz letter ⟨Ꚇ⟩ (Cche)
- ⟨ʎ⟩: sans-serif ⟨⅄⟩

Place →	Labial					Coronal										Dorsal					Laryngeal			
Manner ↓	Bilabial		Labiodental		Linguolabial		Dental		Alveolar		Postalveolar		Retroflex		(Alveolo-)palatal		Velar		Uvular		Pharyngeal/epiglottal		Glottal	
Nasal	m̥	m	ɱ̊	ɱ		n̼	n̪̊	n̪	n̥	n	n̠̊	n̠	ɳ̊	ɳ	ɲ̊	ɲ	ŋ̊	ŋ	ɴ̥	ɴ				
Plosive	p	b	p̪	b̪	t̼	d̼	t̪	d̪	t	d			ʈ	ɖ	c	ɟ	k	ɡ	q	ɢ	ʡ		ʔ	
Sibilant affricate							t̪s̪	d̪z̪	ts	dz	t̠ʃ	d̠ʒ	tʂ	dʐ	tɕ	dʑ								
Non-sibilant affricate	pɸ	bβ	p̪f	b̪v			t̪θ	d̪ð	tɹ̝̊	dɹ̝	t̠ɹ̠̊˔	d̠ɹ̠˔			cç	ɟʝ	kx	ɡɣ	qχ	ɢʁ	ʡʜ	ʡʢ	ʔh	
Sibilant fricative							s̪	z̪	s	z	ʃ	ʒ	ʂ	ʐ	ɕ	ʑ								
Non-sibilant fricative	ɸ	β	f	v	θ̼	ð̼	θ	ð	θ̠	ð̠	ɹ̠̊˔	ɹ̠˔	ɻ̊˔	ɻ˔	ç	ʝ	x	ɣ	χ	ʁ	ħ	ʕ	h	ɦ
Approximant		β̞		ʋ				ð̞		ɹ		ɹ̠		ɻ		j		ɰ						˷
Tap/flap		ⱱ̟		ⱱ					ɾ̥	ɾ			ɽ̊	ɽ						ɢ̆		ʡ̆		
Trill	ʙ̥	ʙ							r̥	r		r̠	ɽ̊r̥	ɽr					ʀ̥	ʀ	ʜ	ʢ		
Lateral affricate									tɬ	dɮ			tꞎ	d𝼅	c𝼆	ɟʎ̝	k𝼄	ɡʟ̝						
Lateral fricative							ɬ̪		ɬ	ɮ			ꞎ	𝼅	𝼆	ʎ̝	𝼄	ʟ̝						
Lateral approximant								l̪	l̥	l		l̠	ɭ̊	ɭ	ʎ̥	ʎ	ʟ̥	ʟ		ʟ̠				
Lateral tap/flap									ɺ̥	ɺ			𝼈̊	𝼈		ʎ̆		ʟ̆						

		BL	LD	D	A	PA	RF	P	V	U
Implosive	Voiced	ɓ			ɗ		ᶑ	ʄ	ɠ	ʛ
Implosive	Voiceless	ɓ̥			ɗ̥		ᶑ̊	ʄ̊	ɠ̊	ʛ̥
Ejective	Stop	pʼ			tʼ		ʈʼ	cʼ	kʼ	qʼ
Ejective	Affricate		p̪fʼ	tθʼ	tsʼ	tʃʼ	tʂʼ	tɕʼ	kxʼ	qχʼ
Ejective	Fricative	ɸʼ	fʼ	θʼ	sʼ	ʃʼ	ʂʼ	ɕʼ	xʼ	χʼ
Ejective	Lateral affricate				tɬʼ			c𝼆ʼ	k𝼄ʼ	q𝼄ʼ
Ejective	Lateral fricative				ɬʼ					
Click (top: velar; bottom: uvular)	Tenuis	kʘ qʘ		kǀ qǀ	kǃ qǃ		k𝼊 q𝼊	kǂ qǂ		
Click (top: velar; bottom: uvular)	Voiced	ɡʘ ɢʘ		ɡǀ ɢǀ	ɡǃ ɢǃ		ɡ𝼊 ɢ𝼊	ɡǂ ɢǂ		
Click (top: velar; bottom: uvular)	Nasal	ŋʘ ɴʘ		ŋǀ ɴǀ	ŋǃ ɴǃ		ŋ𝼊 ɴ𝼊	ŋǂ ɴǂ	ʞ	
Click (top: velar; bottom: uvular)	Tenuis lateral				kǁ qǁ					
Click (top: velar; bottom: uvular)	Voiced lateral				ɡǁ ɢǁ					
Click (top: velar; bottom: uvular)	Nasal lateral				ŋǁ ɴǁ					
