= ISO 6438 =

ISO standard

ISO 6438:1983, Documentation — African coded character set for bibliographic information interchange, is an ISO standard for an 8-bit character encoding for African languages. Developed separately from the African reference alphabet but apparently based on the same data sets, it has had little use; its forms are retained in Unicode. FreeDOS calls this Code Page 65504.

== Character set ==
ISO 6438
	0	1	2	3	4	5	6	7	8	9	A	B	C	D	E	F
Ax			Ɓ 0181	Ƈ 0187	Ɗ 018A	Ɖ 0189		Ɛ 0190	Ǝ 018E		Ƒ 0191	Ɠ 0193	Ɣ 0194	Ħ 0126		Ɨ 0197
Bx			ɓ 0253	ƈ 0188	ɗ 0257	ɖ 0256		ɛ 025B	ə 0259		ƒ 0192	ɠ 0260	ɣ 0263	ħ 0127		ɪ 026A
Cx	Ƙ 0198							Ŋ 014A		Ɵ 019F	Ɔ 0186	Ƥ 01A4				Ʃ 01A9
Dx	ƙ 0199	ɬ 026C	ɱ 0271	ɳ 0273	ɲ 0272			ŋ 014B		ɵ 0275	ɔ 0254	ƥ 01A5		ɽ 027D		ʃ 0283
Ex	Ƭ 01AC	Ʈ 01AE		Ʊ 01B1	Ʋ 01B2	Ꭓ^{Χ} A7B3	Ƴ 01B3	Ʒ 01B7								
Fx	ƭ 01AD	ʈ 0288		ʊ 028A	ʋ 028B	ꭓ^{χ} AB53	ƴ 01B4	ʒ 0292	ʕ 0295	ʔ 0294	ʘ 0298	ǀ 01C0	ǂ 01C2	ǃ 01C3	ǁ 01C1	

- ^Χ Prior to Unicode 7.0, F5 mapped to U+03C7 χ GREEK SMALL LETTER CHI.
  Prior to Unicode 8.0, E5 mapped to U+03A7 Χ GREEK CAPITAL LETTER CHI.

== See also ==
- Africa Alphabet
- African Reference Alphabet
- Dinka alphabet
- Pan-Nigerian alphabet
- Lepsius Standard Alphabet
