= Strikethrough =

Words with a horizontal line through them

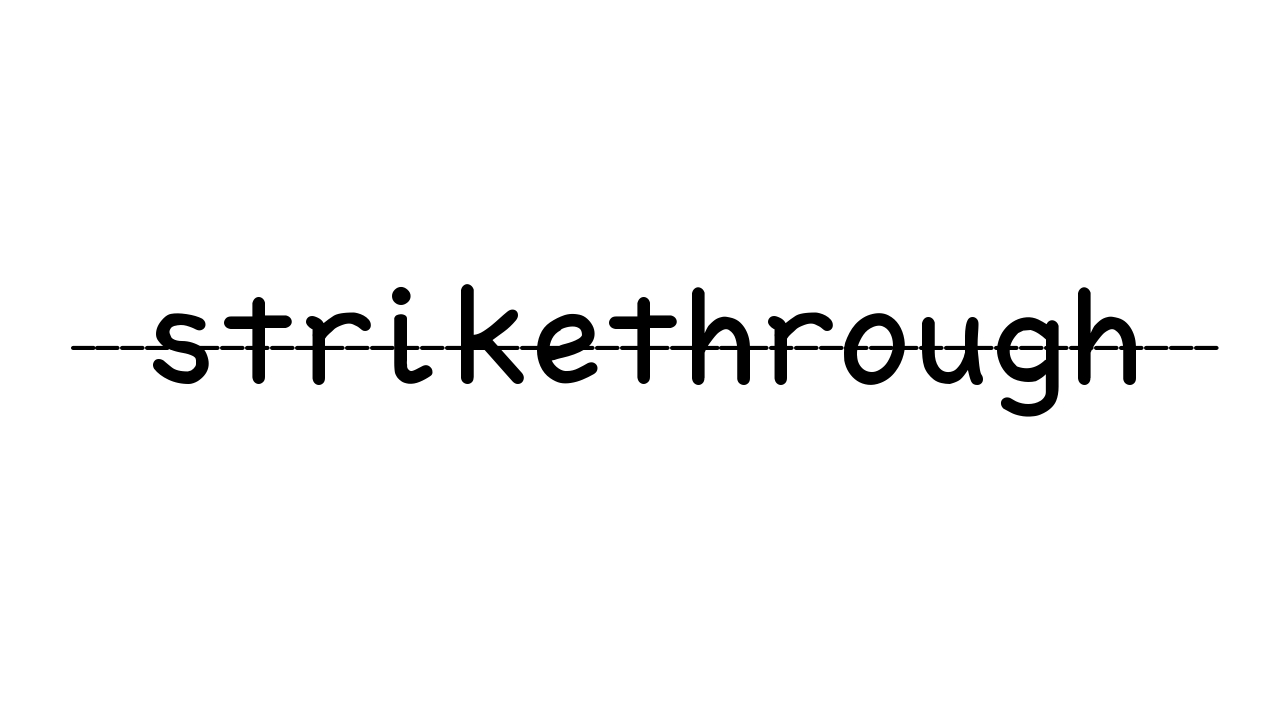
An example of strikethrough

Strikethrough, or strikeout, is a typographical presentation of words with a horizontal line through their middle. Less common alternative forms of strikethrough are an X or a forward slash typed over each letter.

In medieval manuscripts, where strikethrough appears as a red line over the otherwise black text, the purpose is to highlight the text, giving it emphasis. In modern texts, the purpose is the opposite; it indicates removed text. Contrary to censored or redacted texts, the words remain readable.

== Appearance ==
Strikethrough primarily appears as a horizontal line across the middle of words. This appearance is the easiest to achieve by hand, as it only requires one continuous stroke with a pen, pencil, or other writing instruments. Less common forms of strikethrough include drawing an X (cross) or / (solidus) over each letter of the word. To strike long words or phrases, this method is cumbersome to produce by hand, but may be the preferred method for single letters, where the horizontal line does not produce the necessary visibility, and could be missed.

On personal computers, double strikethrough is an option in some word processors, spreadsheets, presentation software, and graphics software, e.g., in Microsoft Office, Collabora Online and LibreOffice. In Japan, double strikethrough is conventionally used because in complex kanji, a single strikethrough may be missed or confused with a stroke in the character. Otherwise, there is no generally agreed meaning of double strikethrough.

== Uses ==
In modern prose, however, strikethrough is primarily used to mark text as a mistake or to be removed. Word processors capable of tracking changes use strikethrough on deleted words.

Historically, however, strikethrough was not even the primary way to mark errors. Errors were more commonly marked by placing dots under letters to be ignored (Latin: punctum delens). In medieval manuscripts such as the Domesday Book, "strikethrough" of text with red ink often functions as highlighting similar to modern underline.

== Computer representations ==
=== Word processors ===
WordStar supported the "strikeout" decoration since version 3.0 in 1982, although the functionality may have been present in earlier versions. Wordstar was launched in 1978. It dominated the personal computer market as the most popular word processing program until 1985, when WordPerfect gained dominance. All word processors with functionality beyond basic editing include strikeout, though they prefer the term "strikethrough".

=== HTML and CSS ===
Early versions of the Hypertext Markup Language (HTML) specify the <strike> or <s> tags for rendering text with strikethrough. These tags, however, are purely decorative. In 1999, the HTML standard version 4.01 deprecated them in favor of the <del> tag, a semantic element for marking deleted text. Web browsers and other user agents often render the contents of this tag with strikethrough. In the HTML5 draft, the <s> is redefined as a semantic tag that marks its text as no longer correct. The <del> remains unchanged and still specifies deleted text.

Since HTML5 has done away with purely decorative strikethrough tags, the Cascading Style Sheets (CSS) language is in charge of decoration and formatting. A CSS user agent renders the text with strikethrough when the text-decoration CSS property has a line-through value. For example:

<span style="text-decoration: line-through;">ABCD efghi</span>

...renders as:

~~ABCD efghi~~

The <s> and <del> tags already carry the aforementioned strikethrough definition, but also attach their semantic properties ("not longer correct" and "deleted") to the text.

==== Other markup symbols ====
- BB Code, a markup language used on many web forums, specifies the [s] and [strike] tags for decorating text with strikethrough.
- GitHub-flavored Markdown uses double tilde ~~ to wrap around text for strikethrough.
- Google Chat or WhatsApp render text surrounded with the ~ (tilde) character as struck out.

=== Unicode ===
==== Combining characters ====
In plain text scenarios where markup cannot be used, Unicode offers a number of combining characters that achieve similar effects.

The "combining long stroke overlay" (U+0336) results in a stroke across text (may or may not be unbroken depending on the typeface used):

A̶B̶C̶D̶ ̶e̶f̶g̶h̶i̶

while the "combining short stroke overlay" (U+0335) results in individually struck out characters:

A̵B̵C̵D̵ ̵e̵f̵g̵h̵i̵

Similarly, the "combining short solidus overlay" (U+0337) results in diagonally struck out letters:

A̷B̷C̷D̷ ̷e̷f̷g̷h̷i̷

as does the "combining long solidus overlay" (U+0338), which produces longer diagonal strokes:

A̸B̸C̸D̸ ̸e̸f̸g̸h̸i̸

==== Specific struck-through characters ====
A number of characters that have the visual appearance of struck-through characters have unique codepoints in Unicode, including:

- ƀ
- Đ
- Ð
- Ǥ
- Ħ
- Ɨ
- Ɉ
- Ł
- Ƚ
- Ɵ
- ꝵ
- Ŧ
- Ʉ
- Ƶ
- ƻ
- ʡ
- ʢ
- Ғ
- Ҟ
- Ұ
- Ҍ

These usually have specific functions (for example, in the Latin Extended-A character set) or representations and are not intended for general use. However, they are not precomposed characters and have neither canonical nor compatibility decompositions. This issue has created security considerations since "precomposed" characters like U+019F and sequences like U+004F U+0335 or U+004F U+0336 often cause visual confusion (compare ⟨Ɵ⟩, ⟨O̵⟩ and ⟨O̶⟩). Unicode has acknowledged this issue and has proposed a standardized method for counteraction.

For slashed letters in an orthography, unitary letters are provided by Unicode. The marks are used in generic applications, such as math operators which systematically use the solidus overlay to indicate negation.

== Research ==
Since at least 2014, researchers in the area of optical character recognition have attempted to solve the problem of recognizing struck-out text in handwritten documents.

== See also ==
- Bar (diacritic)
