= C with hook =

Latin letter C with hook

Majuscule and minuscule ⟨Ƈ ƈ⟩

Ƈ (minuscule: ƈ) is a letter of the Latin alphabet, derived from C with the addition of a hook. It is used in African languages such as Serer.

The minuscule ƈ was formerly used in the International Phonetic Alphabet to represent a voiceless palatal implosive (current IPA: [ ʄ̊ ]). It was withdrawn in 1993.

In Unicode it is U+0187 (LATIN CAPITAL LETTER C WITH HOOK) and U+0188 (LATIN SMALL LETTER C WITH HOOK).

These letters are contained in the normative part of DIN 91379: "Characters and defined character sequences in Unicode for the electronic processing of names and data exchange in Europe, with CD-ROM".

== See also ==
- Ɓ ɓ
- Ɗ ɗ
- Ɠ ɠ
- Ƙ ƙ
- Ƥ ƥ
- Ƭ ƭ
- Ƴ ƴ
