= Backwards E =

Backwards E may refer to:

- Ǝ, a letter used in several alphabets, such as Pan-Nigerian or the African Reference Alphabet
- ɘ, the IPA symbol for the close-mid central unrounded vowel
- ∃, a symbol that is used to represent existential quantification in predicate Logic
- Ǝ, a symbol that is used in the name "EMINƎM" for the rapper Eminem – for example, on his fourth and fifth studio albums, The Eminem Show and Encore, respectively.
- Ǝ, used for the logo and name on the Philippine Band, ƎRASƎRHƎADS. (also commonly known as Eraserheads)
