= Bar (diacritic) =

Diacritic used in some languages

◌̵o

Stroke, bar
◌̶	◌̷	◌̸	◌⃒	◌⃓

In Unicode
- U+0335 ◌̵ COMBINING SHORT STROKE OVERLAY; U+0336 ◌̶ COMBINING LONG STROKE OVERLAY; U+0337 ◌̷ COMBINING SHORT SOLIDUS OVERLAY; U+0338 ◌̸ COMBINING LONG SOLIDUS OVERLAY; U+20D2 ◌⃒ COMBINING LONG VERTICAL LINE OVERLAY; U+20D3 ◌⃓ COMBINING SHORT VERTICAL LINE OVERLAY

See also
- U+0305 ◌̅ COMBINING OVERLINE; U+0332 ◌̲ COMBINING LOW LINE

A bar or stroke is a modification consisting of a line drawn through a grapheme. It may be used as a diacritic to derive new letters from old ones, or simply as an addition to make a grapheme more distinct from others. It can take the form of a vertical bar, slash, or crossbar.

A stroke is sometimes drawn through the numerals 7 (horizontal overbar) and 0 (overstruck foreslash), to make them more distinguishable from the number 1 and the letter O, respectively. (In some typefaces, one or other or both of these characters are designed in these styles; they are not produced by overstrike or by combining diacritic. The normal way in most of Europe to write the number seven is with a bar.)

In medieval English scribal abbreviations, a stroke or bar was used to indicate abbreviation. For example, the pound sign ⟨£⟩, is $\mathfrak{L}$ (a blackletter ⟨L⟩), with a cross bar. (Note: See Pound sign#Origin for details.)

For the specific usages of various letters with bars and strokes, see their individual articles.

== Letters with single bar ==
- Bar ◌̵ ◌̶ ◌̷ ◌̸
  Latin:
- Ⱥ ⱥ, Ꜻ ꜻ, 𝽀 𝽁
- ꬰ
- Ƀ ƀ, ᴃ, ᴯ, ␢, 𝿒
- Ȼ ȼ, Ꞓ ꞓ
- Ð ð, Đ đ, Ɖ ɖ, Ꟈ ꟈ, ꝱ, 𝿓
- Ɇ ɇ, ꬳ, 𝽃, 𝽄
- Ꞙ ꞙ
- Ǥ ǥ, Ꞡ ꞡ, 𝽅, 𝿔
- Ħ ħ, ꟸ, 𐞕, 𝽇, 𝼲, 𝽆, 𝼾, 𝿘
- Ɨ ɨ, ᵻ, ᶤ, ᶧ, 𝼚
- ᵼ
- Ɉ ɉ, ɟ, ʄ, ᶡ, 𐞘, 𝿙
- Ꝁ ꝁ, Ꝃ ꝃ, Ꞣ ꞣ, 𝽈 𝽉
- Ł ł, Ƚ ƚ, ᴌ, Ꝉ ꝉ, ꝲ, 𝿕, 𝿖
- Ƛ ƛ
- ꝳ, 𝽌, 𝽊 𝽋
- Ꞥ ꞥ, 𝽏, ꝴ, 𝽍 𝽎
- Ø ø, Ǿ ǿ, ᴓ, 𐞢, ᶱ, ᷭ, ꬾ, Ꝋ ꝋ, Ɵ ɵ
- ꭁ, ꭂ
- ꬿ, ꭄ, 𝽂
- Ᵽ ᵽ, Ꝑ ꝑ
- Ꝗ ꝗ, Ꝙ ꝙ
- Ɍ ɍ, Ꞧ ꞧ, ꝶ ꝵ, 𝽐, 𝿗
- ẜ, ẝ, Ꞩ ꞩ, Ꟊ ꟊ, Ꟍ ꟍ
- Ŧ ŧ, Ⱦ ⱦ, ꝷ, ᵺ
- Ʉ ʉ, Ꞹ ꞹ, ᵾ, ꭏ, ᶶ, ᷰ
- ᵿ, 𝿚
- Ꝟ ꝟ, 𝽑 𝽒
- 𝼿, 𝿛
- ꭕ ꭙ, 𝽔
- Ɏ ɏ, 𝽕
- Ƶ ƶ
- Ꝥ ꝥ, Ꝧ ꝧ
- ƻ
- ʡ, 𐞳, ʢ, 𐞴, 𝽖
- 𝽓
  Non-Latin:
- ℏ
  Currency sign:
- ฿
- ₵
- ¢
- ₫
- ₣
- ₲
- 𐆙
- 𐆘
- ₭
- £
- ₥
- $
- 𐆗
- 𐆖
- ৳
- ៛
- 𐆚

== Letters with double bar ==
- Double bar //
  Latin:
- Ꝅ ꝅ, Ⱡ ⱡ
- ǂ
- 𝼋, 𝼌, 𐞿
  Non-Latin:
- ࢦ
  Currency sign:
- ₳
- ₿
- ₡
- €
- ₾
- ₴
- ₤, ₺
- ₦
- ₱, ₽
- ֏
- ₮
- ₩
- ¥
- ₹

== See also ==
- Strikethrough
- X-bar theory (formal linguistics)
- Parallel (operator)
