= Tittle =

Diacritical mark, the dot of the letters i and j

Lowercase i and j in Liberation Serif, with tittles highlighted in red

The tittle or superscript dot is the dot on top of lowercase i and j. In English writing the tittle is a diacritic which appears only as part of these glyphs, but diacritic dots can appear over other letters in various languages. In most languages, the tittle of i or j is omitted when a diacritic is placed in the tittle's usual position (as í or ĵ), but not when the diacritic appears elsewhere (as į, ɉ).

== Use ==
The word tittle is rarely used. One notable occurrence is in the King James Bible at Matthew 5:18: "For verily I say unto you, Till heaven and earth pass, one jot or one tittle shall in no wise pass from the law, till all be fulfilled" (KJV). The quotation uses "jot" and "tittle" as examples of extremely small graphic details in "the Law", presumably referring to the Hebrew text of the Torah. In English the phrase "jot and tittle" indicates that every small detail has received attention.

The Greek terms translated in English as "jot" and "tittle" in Matthew 5:18 are iota and keraia (Greek: κεραία). Iota is the smallest letter of the Greek alphabet (ι); the even smaller iota subscript was a medieval innovation. Alternatively, iota may represent yodh (י), the smallest letter of the Hebrew and Aramaic alphabets (to which iota is related). "Keraia" is a hook or serif, and in Matthew 5:18 may refer to Greek diacritics, or, if the reference is to the Hebrew text of the Torah, possibly refers to the pen strokes that distinguish between similar Hebrew letters, e.g., ב (Bet) versus כ (Kaph), or to ornamental pen strokes attached to certain Hebrew letters, or to the Hebrew letter Vav, since in Hebrew vav also means "hook". "Keraia" in Matt. 5:18 cannot refer to vowel marks known as Niqqud, which developed later than the date of Matthew's composition. Others have suggested that "Keraia" refers to markings in cursive scripts of languages derived from Aramaic, such as Syriac, written in Serṭā (ܣܶܪܛܳܐ, 'short line'). In printing modern Greek numerals a keraia is used.

Tittles also exist in Cyrillic, like in the letter і.

== Dotless and dotted i ==
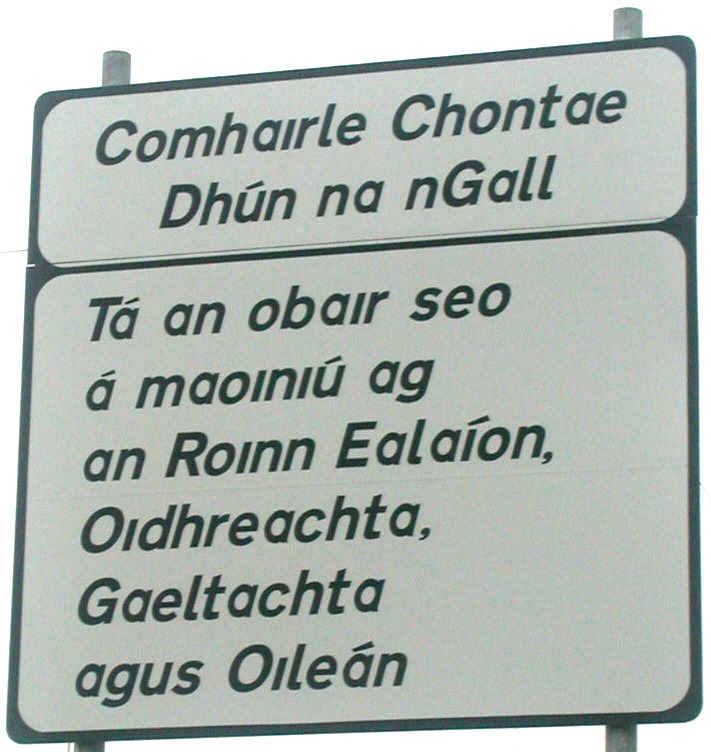
Example of the dotless i on an Irish road sign

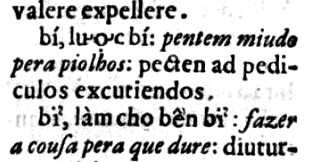
Bí without a tittle and bỉ with a tittle in the Middle Vietnamese dictionary Dictionarium Annamiticum

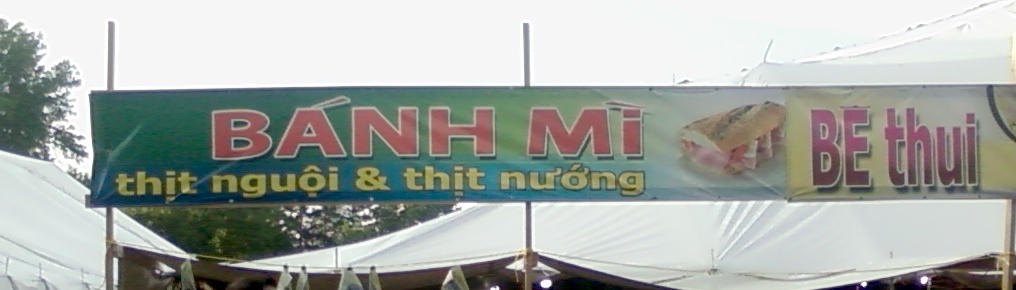
Mì with a tittle on Vietnamese signage

I with acute and hard dot in Lithuanian and Vietnamese

A number of alphabets use dotted and dotless I, both upper and lower case.

In the modern Turkish alphabet, the absence or presence of a tittle distinguishes two different letters representing two different phonemes: the letter "I" / "ı", with the absence of a tittle also on the lower case letter, represents the close back unrounded vowel [ɯ], while "İ" / "i", with the inclusion of a tittle even on the capital letter, represents the close front unrounded vowel [i]. This practice has carried over to several other Turkic languages, like the Azerbaijani alphabet, Crimean Tatar alphabet, and Tatar alphabet.

In some of the Dene languages of the Northwest Territories in Canada, specifically North Slavey, South Slavey, Tłı̨chǫ and Dëne Sųłıné, all instances of i are undotted to avoid confusion with tone-marked vowels í or ì. The other Dene language of the Northwest Territories, Gwich’in, always includes the tittle on lowercase i.

There is only one letter I in Irish, but i is undotted in the traditional uncial Gaelic script to avoid confusion of the tittle with the buailte overdot found over consonants. Modern texts replace the buailte with the letter h, and use the same antiqua-descendant fonts, which have a tittle, as other Latin-alphabet languages. Bilingual road signs formerly used dotless i in lowercase Irish text to better distinguish i from í. The letter "j" is not used in Irish other than in foreign words.

In most Latin-based orthographies, the lowercase letter i conventionally has its dot replaced when a diacritical mark atop the letter, such as a tilde or caron, is placed. The tittle is sometimes retained in some languages. In some Baltic languages sources, the lowercase letter i sometimes retains a tittle even when accented. In Vietnamese in the 17th century, the tittle is preserved atop ỉ and ị but not ì and í, as seen in the seminal quốc ngữ reference Dictionarium Annamiticum Lusitanum et Latinum. In modern Vietnamese, a tittle can be seen in ì, ỉ, ĩ, and í in cursive handwriting and some signage. This detail rarely occurs in computers and on the Internet, due to the obscurity of language-specific fonts. In any case, the tittle is always retained in ị.

A particular and unique variant is in the Johnston typeface, long employed by and proprietary to the Transport for London organisation and its associates, in print and notices, where above a certain point size the dot (and full stop) are diamond shaped, this being among the most distinguishing features of the font.

== Dotless and dotted j ==
"ȷ" is a very uncommon letter, existing in only a few scripts. "ɟ" represents a voiced palatal plosive in the International Phonetic Alphabet. There is no Unicode character for a dotted capital J, so a combining diacritic character must be used, resulting in "J̇".

== Phrases ==
- It is thought that the phrase "to a T" is derived from the word tittle because long before "to a T" became popular, the phrase "to a tittle" was used.
- The phrase "to dot the i's and cross the t's" is used figuratively to mean "to put the finishing touches to" or "to be thorough".

== Sources ==
- Dictionary.com – Tittle
