= I =

Ninth letter of the Latin alphabet

- I i

Usage
- Writing system: Latin script
- Type: Alphabetic
- Language of origin: Latin language
- Sound values: [i]; [ɨ]; [j]; [ɪ]; [ə]; [ɯ]; [a]; [aɪ]; [ɑɪ]; [ɒɪ]; [ʌɪ]; [əɪ]
- In Unicode: U+0049, U+0069
- Alphabetical position: 9

History
Development
D36
          - Ιι
            - 𐌉
              - I i
- Time period: c. 700 BCE to present
- Descendants: Î; J; Ɉ; İ; ı; Tittle; ꟾ; ꟷ; ᛁ; ᴉ
- Sisters: І; י; ܝ; ی; ࠉ; 𐎊; ዪ; Ⴢ; ⴢ; ჲ; ☞; ☚

Other
- Associated graphs: i(x), ij, i(x)(y)
- Writing direction: Left-to-right

I (minuscule: i) is the ninth letter and the third vowel letter of the Latin alphabet, used in the modern English alphabet, the alphabets of other western European languages and others worldwide. Its name in English is i (pronounced /ˈaɪ/), plural i's or is.

== Name ==
In English, the name of the letter is the "long I" sound, pronounced /ˈaɪ/. In most other languages, its name matches the letter's pronunciation in open syllables.

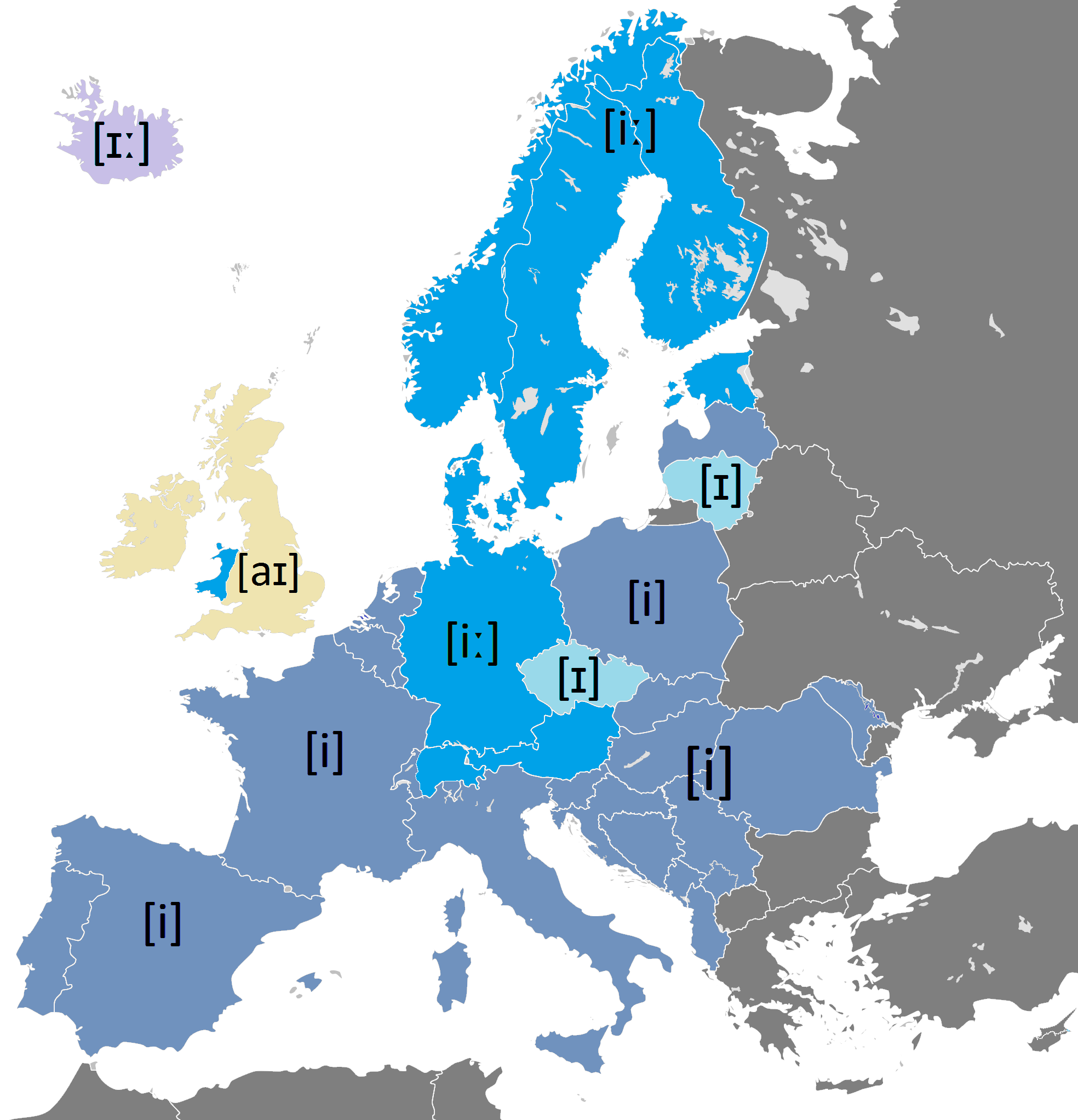
Pronunciation of the name of the letter ⟨i⟩ in European languages

== History ==
Egyptian hieroglyph ꜥ	Phoenician Yodh	Western Greek Iota	Etruscan I	Latin I
Egyptian Hieroglyph describing an arm				Latin I

In the Phoenician alphabet, the letter may have originated in a hieroglyph for an arm that represented a voiced pharyngeal fricative (/ʕ/) in Egyptian, but was reassigned to /j/ (as in English "yes") by Semites because their word for "arm" began with that sound. This letter could also be used to represent /i/, the close front unrounded vowel, mainly in foreign words.

The Greeks adopted a form of this Phoenician yodh as their letter iota (⟨Ι, ι⟩) to represent /i/, the same as in the Old Italic alphabet. In Latin (as in Modern Greek), it was also used to represent /j/ and this use persists in the languages that descended from Latin. The modern letter 'j' originated as a variation of 'i', and both were used interchangeably for both the vowel and the consonant, coming to be differentiated only in the 16th century.

=== Typographic variants ===
In some sans serif typefaces, the uppercase ⟨I⟩ may be difficult to distinguish from the lowercase letter L, 'l', the vertical bar character '|', or the digit one '1'. In serifed typefaces, the capital form of the letter has both a baseline and a cap height serif, while the lowercase L generally has a hooked ascender and a baseline serif.

The dot over the lowercase 'i' is sometimes called a tittle. The uppercase I does not have a dot, while the lowercase 'i' does in most Latin-derived alphabets. The dot can be considered optional and is usually removed when applying other diacritics. However, some schemes, such as the Turkish alphabet, have two kinds of I: dotted and dotless. In Turkish, dotted İ and dotless I are considered separate letters, representing a front and back vowel, respectively, and both have uppercase ('I', 'İ') and lowercase ('ı', 'i') forms.

The uppercase I has two kinds of shapes, with serifs and without serifs. Usually these are considered equivalent, but they are distinguished in some extended Latin alphabet systems, such as the 1978 version of the African reference alphabet. In that system, the former is the uppercase counterpart of ɪ and the latter is the counterpart of 'i'.

== Use in writing systems ==
Pronunciation of ⟨i⟩ by language
Orthography	Phonemes
Standard Chinese (Pinyin)	/i/
English	/ɪ/, /aɪ/, /ə/, /ɜː/, /aɪə/, /j/
Esperanto	/i/
French	/i/, /j/
German	/ɪ/, /iː/, /i/
Italian	/i/, /iː/, /j/
Kurmanji (Hawar)	/ɪ/
Portuguese	/i/, /j/
Spanish	/i/, /ʝ/
Turkish	/ɯ/ for dotless ⟨I, ı⟩
Turkish	/i/ for dotted ⟨İ, i⟩

=== English ===
In Modern English spelling, ⟨i⟩ represents several different sounds, either the diphthong /aɪ/ ("long" ⟨i⟩) as in kite, the short /ɪ/ as in bill, or the ⟨ee⟩ sound /iː/ in the last syllable of machine. The diphthong /aɪ/ developed from Middle English /iː/ through a series of vowel shifts. In the Great Vowel Shift, Middle English /iː/ changed to Early Modern English /ei/, which later changed to /əi/ and finally to the Modern English diphthong /aɪ/ in General American and Received Pronunciation. Because the diphthong /aɪ/ developed from a Middle English long vowel, it is called "long" ⟨i⟩ in traditional English grammar.

The letter ⟨i⟩ is the fifth most common letter in the English language.

The English first-person singular nominative pronoun is "I", pronounced /aɪ/ and always written with a capital letter. This pattern arose for basically the same reason that lowercase ⟨i⟩ acquired a dot: so it wouldn't get lost in manuscripts before the age of printing:

The capitalized "I" first showed up about 1250 in the northern and midland dialects of England, according to the Chambers Dictionary of Etymology.

Chambers notes, however, that the capitalized form didn't become established in the south of England until the 1700s (although it appears sporadically before that time).

Capitalizing the pronoun, Chambers explains, made it more distinct, thus "avoiding misreading handwritten manuscripts."

=== Other languages ===
In many languages' orthographies, ⟨i⟩ is used to represent the sound /i/ or, more rarely, /ɪ/.

=== Other systems ===
In the International Phonetic Alphabet, ⟨i⟩ represents the close front unrounded vowel. The small caps ⟨ɪ⟩ represents the near-close near-front unrounded vowel.

== Other uses ==
Tourist information point (UK)

- The Roman numeral I represents the number 1.
- In mathematics, a lowercase "i" is used to represent the unit imaginary number, while an uppercase "I" serves to denote an identity matrix.
- In some countries, a sign bearing the letter i or i indicates an information point, sometimes specifically for a visitor center.

== Related characters ==
=== Descendants and related characters in the Latin alphabet ===
- I with diacritics: Ị ị Ĭ ĭ Î î Ǐ ǐ Ɨ ɨ Ï ï Ḯ ḯ Í í Ì ì Ȉ ȉ Į į Į́ Į̃ Ī ī Ī̀ ī̀ ᶖ Ỉ ỉ Ȋ ȋ Ĩ ĩ Ḭ ḭ ᶤ
- İ i and I ı : Latin letters dotted and dotless I
- IPA-specific symbols related to I: ɪ ɨ
- The Uralic Phonetic Alphabet uses various forms of the letter I:
  - U+1D35 ᴵ MODIFIER LETTER CAPITAL I
  - U+1D62 ᵢ LATIN SUBSCRIPT SMALL LETTER I
  - U+1D09 ᴉ LATIN SMALL LETTER TURNED I
  - U+1D4E ᵎ MODIFIER LETTER SMALL TURNED I
- The English Phonotypic Alphabet uses various forms of the letter I:
  - U+1DF6E 𝽮 LATIN CAPITAL LETTER PHONOTYPIC DIPHTHONG AI
  - U+1DF6F 𝽯 LATIN SMALL LETTER PHONOTYPIC DIPHTHONG AI
  - U+1DF70 𝽰 LATIN SMALL LETTER I WITH PIGTAIL AT BOTTOM
  - U+1DF71 𝽱 LATIN SMALL LETTER STRETCHED I
- Other variations used in phonetic transcription: ᵻ ᶤ ᶦ ᶧ 𝼚
- ⁱ : Superscript small i is used for computer terminal graphics
- Ꞽ ꞽ : Glottal I, used for Egyptological yod
- Ɪ ɪ : Small capital I
- ꟾ : Long I
- ꟷ : Sideways I

=== Ancestors and siblings in other alphabets ===
- 𐤉 : Semitic letter Yodh, from which the following symbols originally derive:
  - Ι ι: Greek letter Iota, from which the following letters derive:
    - Ⲓ ⲓ : Coptic letter Yota
    - І і : Cyrillic letter soft-dotted I
    - 𐌉 : Old Italic I, which is the ancestor of modern Latin I
      - ᛁ : Runic letter isaz, which probably derives from old Italic I
    - 𐌹 : Gothic letter iiz

== Other representations ==
=== Unicode ===
- U+0049 I LATIN CAPITAL LETTER I
- U+0069 i LATIN SMALL LETTER I
- U+0130 İ LATIN CAPITAL LETTER I WITH DOT ABOVE
- U+0131 ı LATIN SMALL LETTER DOTLESS I
- U+2139 ℹ INFORMATION SOURCE
- U+FF29 Ｉ FULLWIDTH LATIN CAPITAL LETTER I
- U+FF49 ｉ FULLWIDTH LATIN SMALL LETTER I

The positions 0x49 and 0x69 were used by ASCII and inherited by Unicode. EBCDIC used 0xC9 and 0x89 for I and i.

=== Other ===
NATO phonetic	Morse code
India	▄ ▄

Signal flag

Flag semaphore
American manual alphabet (ASL fingerspelling)
British manual alphabet (BSL fingerspelling)
Braille dots-24
Unified English Braille
