= S with swash tail =

Latin letter formerly used in African linguistics and Shona

Latin S with swash tail

Ȿ (lowercase: ȿ) is a Latin letter s with a "swash tail" (encoded by Unicode, at codepoints U+2C7E for uppercase and U+023F for lowercase) that was used as a phonetic symbol by linguists studying African languages to represent the sound [sʷ].

In 1931, it was adopted into the orthography of Shona for a 'whistled' s, but it was dropped in 1955 due to the lack of the character on typewriters and fonts. Today the digraph sv is used.

== See also ==
- ɀ
- ʂ
