= C with stroke =

Letter of the Latin alphabet

c with stroke in Doulos SIL

Ȼ (minuscule: ȼ) is a letter of the Latin alphabet, formed from C with the addition of a stroke through the letter. Its minuscule form represents the sound [ts] (ts as in cats) in certain phonetic transcription systems for the indigenous languages of Mexico. The Saanich alphabet uses its majuscule form (the alphabet is caseless) for [kʷ] (qu as in quilt). In Unifon, a phonemic transcription for American English, it represents /tʃ/.

== Biology ==
In French-speaking countries, ȼ (lowercase barred c) is a note-taking abbreviation for cellule (cell).

== Use on computers ==
Ȼ was added to Unicode 4.1 in 2005, in the Latin Extended-B block. It did not previously exist in character sets, and consequently some fonts may not display it; it is often substituted by the cent sign ⟨¢⟩.

Character information
Preview	Ȼ		ȼ	
Unicode name	LATIN CAPITAL LETTER C WITH STROKE		LATIN SMALL LETTER C WITH STROKE	
Encodings	decimal	hex	dec	hex
Unicode	571	U+023B	572	U+023C
UTF-8	200 187	C8 BB	200 188	C8 BC
Numeric character reference	&#571;	&#x23B;	&#572;	&#x23C;

== See also ==
- ¢ the symbol for cent
- ₵, the symbol for the Ghanaian cedi
- ₡, the symbol for the Salvadoran and Costa Rican colón
