= D with top bar =

Letter of the Latin alphabet

Ƌ
- Ƌ ƌ

Usage
- Writing system: Latin script
- Type: Alphabetic and logographic
- Language of origin: Zhuang languages
- Sound values: [ˀd] [ɗ]
- In Unicode: U+018B, U+018C

History
- Development: Б б: Ƃ ƃ; Ƌ ƌ
- Time period: 1957-1982

Other
- Writing direction: Left-to-right

Ƌ (minuscule: ƌ) is a letter derived from the Latin alphabet.

It was used in the standard written form of the Zhuang alphabet (Zhuàngwén) from 1957 to 1982. The alphabet was reformed in 1982 to improve its usefulness by removing all characters that were not part of the English alphabet/numeral system. As part of this reform, ƌ was replaced by the digraph nd.

It represented a pre-glottalized voiced alveolar stop [ˀd].

== In Unicode ==
Its Unicode codepoints are U+018B Ƌ LATIN CAPITAL LETTER D WITH TOPBAR and U+018C ƌ LATIN SMALL LETTER D WITH TOPBAR.

== See also ==
- U+0182 Ƃ LATIN CAPITAL LETTER B WITH TOPBAR
- U+0183 ƃ LATIN SMALL LETTER B WITH TOPBAR
- Guangxi and Wenshan Prefecture in Yunnan (China), where the language is used.
