= Ȋ =

Latin letter I with inverted breve

I with flipped breve

Ȋ or ȋ is a letter of the Latin script formed by the addition of an inverted breve accent above the Latin letter I. The letter is not used in any current writing system, nor in any past one. It has historically been used in traditional Slavicist notation of Serbo-Croatian phonology to indicate a long falling accent on an i, when the i is the nucleus of a syllable.

== Computer encoding ==
Character information
Preview	Ȋ		ȋ	
Unicode name	LATIN CAPITAL LETTER I WITH INVERTED BREVE		LATIN SMALL LETTER I WITH INVERTED BREVE	
Encodings	decimal	hex	dec	hex
Unicode	522	U+020A	523	U+020B
UTF-8	200 138	C8 8A	200 139	C8 8B
Numeric character reference	&#522;	&#x20A;	&#523;	&#x20B;
