= Q with hook tail =

Letter of the extended Latin alphabet

Latin letter Q with hook tail

Q with hook tail (majuscule: Ɋ, minuscule: ɋ) is a letter of the extended Latin alphabet. It was introduced by Lutheran missionaries in Papua New Guinea for use in the Numanggang language in the 1930s or 1940s. In 2002, it was decided to discontinue using the letter. It is still used in the Kâte language to represent a voiced labial-velar plosive /ɡ͡b/ (Q q is used for the voiceless equivalent /k͡p/). The Bargam language also uses it to represent the glottal stop. In some forms of handwriting for English (and presumably other languages based on the Latin alphabet), lowercase q always has a hook tail. This is particularly evident in geometric sans-serif typefaces used to teach children how to write.

The letter has also been used to represent the bilabial clicks; in such cases it is better interpreted as a turned b (or reversed p) with tail.

== Computing codes ==
Character information
Preview	Ɋ		ɋ	
Unicode name	LATIN CAPITAL LETTER; SMALL Q WITH HOOK TAIL		LATIN SMALL LETTER; Q WITH HOOK TAIL	
Encodings	decimal	hex	dec	hex
Unicode	586	U+024A	587	U+024B
UTF-8	201 138	C9 8A	201 139	C9 8B
Numeric character reference	&#586;	&#x24A;	&#587;	&#x24B;
