= R with stroke =

Letter of the Latin alphabet (Ɍ, ɍ)

Latin R with stroke

R with stroke (majuscule: Ɍ, minuscule: ɍ) is a letter of the extended Latin alphabet, derived from R with the addition of a flat bar through the middle of the letter. It should not be confused with ℞, a symbol used for medical prescriptions.

== Usage ==
It is used in the Kanuri language and Manga Kanuri language, where it represents a voiced retroflex consonant sound, although the exact manner of articulation is unclear and may vary between a lateral approximant [ɭ], a lateral tap [𝼈], or a non-lateral tap [ɽ].

It also appears in Tunisian Arabic transliteration (based on Maltese with additional letters).

Ɍ was also used in the Unified Northern Alphabet, which was based on Latin rather than Cyrillic letters because it was developed during the later-cancelled process of Latinisation in the Soviet Union. However, this character was only used within the UNA for the Aleut language.

== Code positions ==
Character information
Preview	Ɍ		ɍ	
Unicode name	LATIN CAPITAL LETTER R WITH STROKE		LATIN SMALL LETTER R WITH STROKE	
Encodings	decimal	hex	dec	hex
Unicode	588	U+024C	589	U+024D
UTF-8	201 140	C9 8C	201 141	C9 8D
Numeric character reference	&#588;	&#x24C;	&#589;	&#x24D;
