= Y with stroke =

Letter of the Latin alphabet

Y with stroke, uppercase and lowercase

Y with stroke (majuscule: Ɏ; minuscule: ɏ) is a letter of the Latin script, derived from Y with the addition of a stroke through the top of the letter.

== Uses ==
It is used in the Lubuagan Kalinga language of the Philippines. It is also used by Welsh medievalists to represent the schwa vowel sound.

== Code positions ==
Character encoding	Case	Decimal	Hexadecimal
Unicode	Capital	590	024E
Unicode	Small	591	024F

== See also ==
- ¥ (Japanese yen or Chinese yuan)
- Ұ (Kazakh Short U)
