= Ȓ =

Latin letter R with inverted breve

- Ȓ ȓ

Usage
- Writing system: Latin
- Type: Alphabet
- In Unicode: U+0212, U+0213

History
Development
D1
    - Ρ ρ
      - 𐌓
            - R r
              - Ȓ ȓ

Other
- Writing direction: Left-to-right

Ȓ (or ȓ) is a letter used in the Iñupiaq language and discussion of Serbo-Croatian and Slovene phonology and poetics. Its form is derived from the Latin letter R (R r) by an addition of an inverted breve.

== Computing codes ==
Character information
Preview	Ȓ		ȓ	
Unicode name	LATIN CAPITAL LETTER; R WITH INVERTED BREVE		LATIN SMALL LETTER; R WITH INVERTED BREVE	
Encodings	decimal	hex	dec	hex
Unicode	530	U+0212	531	U+0213
UTF-8	200 146	C8 92	200 147	C8 93
Numeric character reference	&#530;	&#x212;	&#531;	&#x213;
