= Z with swash tail =

Latin letter formerly used in Shona orthography

Latin Z with swash tail

Ɀ (lowercase: ɀ) is a Latin letter z with a "swash tail" (encoded by Unicode, at codepoints U+2C7F for uppercase and U+0240 for lowercase). It was used as a phonetic symbol by linguists studying African languages to represent a voiced labio-alveolar fricative ([zʷ]).

In 1931, it was adopted into the orthography of Shona for a 'whistled' or labialized z, but it was dropped in 1955 due to the lack of the character on typewriters and fonts. Use of this character for Shona was significant enough to be mentioned as an additional character in the 1949 guide to the International Phonetic Alphabet, although the character was never an official part of the IPA. However, even at that time, the digraph zv was also used instead of ɀ in Shona writing systems, and zv is the standard way of writing this sound at present.

It is sometimes used to transcribe Toda's /d̪z̪/.

Character information
Preview	Ɀ		ɀ	
Unicode name	LATIN CAPITAL LETTER Z WITH SWASH TAIL		LATIN SMALL LETTER Z WITH SWASH TAIL	
Encodings	decimal	hex	dec	hex
Unicode	11391	U+2C7F	576	U+0240
UTF-8	226 177 191	E2 B1 BF	201 128	C9 80
Numeric character reference	&#11391;	&#x2C7F;	&#576;	&#x240;

== See also ==
- ȿ
- ƍ
- Ȥ "Z with hook"
