= Retroflex fricative =

A retroflex fricative is a fricative consonant produced in the retroflex place of articulation. The International Phonetic Alphabet has dedicated symbols for the following retroflex fricatives:

- Median voiceless retroflex fricative, [ʂ]
- Median voiced retroflex fricative, [ʐ]
- Voiceless retroflex lateral fricative, [ꞎ]
- Voiced retroflex lateral fricative, [𝼅]
