= L with bar =

Letter of the Latin alphabet

Latin L with bar

L with bar (capital Ƚ, lower case ƚ) is a Latin letter L with a bar diacritic. It appears in the alphabet of the Venetian language, and in its capital form it is used in the Saanich orthography created by Dave Elliott in 1978.

In Unicode, both the capital and lower case are in the Latin Extended-B block. The capital (U+023D Ƚ LATIN CAPITAL LETTER L WITH BAR) is part of the "Additions for SENĆOŦEN" (Saanich), while the lower case (U+019A ƚ LATIN SMALL LETTER L WITH BAR) is noted as an "Americanist phonetic usage" as an alternative to U+026C ɬ LATIN SMALL LETTER L WITH BELT, the voiceless alveolar lateral fricative.

== See also ==
- Bar (diacritic)
