= E with stroke =

Letter of the Latin alphabet

Latin E with stroke.

Ɇ (lowercase: ɇ) is a letter of the Latin alphabet, derived from E with the addition of a diagonal stroke through the letter. Both the capital and lowercase variants of E with stroke were added to Unicode in 2004.

It represents [ɛ] in Mazahua and Chinantec of Ojitlán.

It represents [æ] in the Chichimeca Jonaz alphabet .

It is also used in the Ocuiltec alphabet where it represents a mid central vowel [ə].

The Secretaría de Educación Pública de México's practical orthography for indigenous languages uses e with a stroke to indicate a nasalized vowel.

Jacques Pelletier du Mans used ɇ in his proposal for the reform of French orthography Dialoguɇ Dɇ l’Ortografɇ e Prononciation Françoęſɇ (1550), but this failed to gain traction.

== Code positions ==
Character information
Preview	Ɇ		ɇ	
Unicode name	LATIN CAPITAL E WITH STROKE		LATIN SMALL E WITH STROKE	
Encodings	decimal	hex	dec	hex
Unicode	582	U+0246	583	U+0247
UTF-8	201 134	C9 86	201 135	C9 87
Numeric character reference	&#582;	&#x246;	&#583;	&#x247;
