= Double grave accent =

Diacritical mark

◌̏

Double grave accent
- U+030F ◌̏ COMBINING DOUBLE GRAVE ACCENT

The double grave accent (◌̏) is a diacritic used in scholarly discussions of the Serbo-Croatian and sometimes Slovene languages. It is also used in the International Phonetic Alphabet.

In Serbo-Croatian and Slovenian, double grave accent is used to indicate a short falling tone, though in discussion of Slovenian, a single grave accent is also often used for this purpose. The double grave accent is found in both Latin and Cyrillic; however, it is not used in the everyday orthography of any language, only in discussions of phonology.

In the International Phonetic Alphabet, the double grave accent is used to indicate extra-low tone.

The letters a, e, i, o, r, u, and their Cyrillic equivalents а, е, и, о, р, and у can all be found with the double grave accent. Unicode provides precomposed characters for the uppercase and the lowercase Latin letters but not the Cyrillic letters. The Cyrillic letters can be formed using the combining character for the double grave, U+030F ◌̏ COMBINING DOUBLE GRAVE ACCENT. The combining character can also be used with IPA vowel symbols, if necessary.

== Letters with double grave ==
- Double grave ◌̏
  Latin: Ȁ ȁ
- Ȅ ȅ
- Ȉ ȉ
- Ȍ ȍ
- Ȑ ȑ
- Ȕ ȕ
  Cyrillic: А̏ а̏
- Е̏ е̏
- И̏ и̏
- Ο̏ о̏
- Р̏ р̏
- У̏ у̏

== Unicode ==
The letters in the Latin alphabet are precomposed characters; those in the Cyrillic alphabet are formed from the base letter plus the combining diacritic, U+030F ◌̏ COMBINING DOUBLE GRAVE ACCENT.

Latin alphabet
Uppercase	Unicode	Lowercase	Unicode
Ȁ	U+0200	ȁ	U+0201
Ȅ	U+0204	ȅ	U+0205
Ȉ	U+0208	ȉ	U+0209
Ȍ	U+020C	ȍ	U+020D
Ȑ	U+0210	ȑ	U+0211
Ȕ	U+0214	ȕ	U+0215

Cyrillic alphabet
Uppercase	Unicode	Lowercase	Unicode
А̏	U+0410, U+030F	а̏	U+0430, U+030F
Е̏	U+0415, U+030F	е̏	U+0435, U+030F
И̏	U+0418, U+030F	и̏	U+0438, U+030F
Ο̏	U+041E, U+030F	о̏	U+043E, U+030F
Р̏	U+0420, U+030F	р̏	U+0440, U+030F
У̏	U+0423, U+030F	у̏	U+0443, U+030F

== See also ==
- Grave accent
- Double acute accent
- Inverted breve
- Izhitsa, a Cyrillic letter with a form that visually resembles a double grave accent
- IPA
