= Z with hook =

Latin letter Z with hook

Z with hook in Doulos SIL

Z with hook (majuscule: Ȥ, minuscule: ȥ) is an additional letter of the Latin script.

The Unicode standard notes "Middle High German" for the application of the grapheme, intended to represent the coronal fricative /s/ also transcribed as tailed z ⟨ʒ⟩. The ⟨ȥ⟩-character is used in modern printings of Medieval German literature to indicate those cases of ⟨z⟩ pronounced as [s] (in such a case, modern German now uses ⟨s⟩). In contrast, the ⟨z⟩-character is pronounced as /ts/, as is still the case in modern German. And the ⟨s⟩-character is pronounced as /z/.

⟨z⟩ and ⟨ȥ⟩ in Schade (1868).

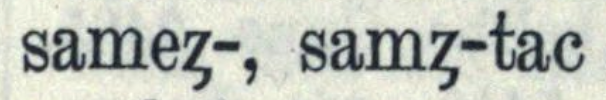
"sameȥ-, samȥ-tac" in von Lexer (1876).

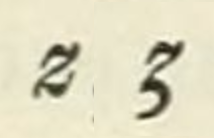
Italic ⟨z⟩ and ⟨ȥ⟩ (appearing nearly identical to ⟨ʒ⟩) in Paul (1918).

== Computer encoding ==
Character information
Preview	Ȥ		ȥ	
Unicode name	LATIN CAPITAL LETTER Z WITH HOOK		LATIN SMALL LETTER Z WITH HOOK	
Encodings	decimal	hex	dec	hex
Unicode	548	U+0224	549	U+0225
UTF-8	200 164	C8 A4	200 165	C8 A5
Numeric character reference	&#548;	&#x224;	&#549;	&#x225;

== See also ==
- Middle High German
- High German consonant shift
- Middle High German literature
- Ʒ (ezh)
- Ɀ (z with swash tail)
- Ⱬ (z with descender)
- Ƶ (z with stroke)
