= Schwa (letter) =

Additional vocalic letter of the Latin alphabet

- Ə ə

Usage
- Writing system: Latin script
- Type: alphabetic
- Sound values: [æ]; [ə]; [ɨ]
- In Unicode: U+018F, U+0259

History
Development
A28
  - 𐤄
    - Ε ε ϵ
      - 𐌄
        - E e
          - Ə ə
- Time period: ~1922 to 1939, 1992 to present
- Descendants: • Ә

Other
- Writing direction: Left-to-right

Ə, or ə, is an additional letter of the Latin alphabet. It is also called schwa, from another name for the mid central vowel, the sound represented by minuscule ə in the International Phonetic Alphabet (IPA).

It was invented by Johann Andreas Schmeller for the reduced vowel at the end of some German words and was first used in his 1820s works on the Bavarian dialects.

The word, schwa, comes from the Hebrew Shva (via German), a Niqqud, which in most cases in Modern Hebrew denotes a de-emphasis of an accompanying vowel that would otherwise be pronounced strongly. Shva itself is silent and is not a mid central vowel, which does not exist in Modern Hebrew.

== Usage ==
It is or was used in several languages around the world, including the Azerbaijani, Gottscheerish, Karay·a and Adyghe languages, the Abenaki language of Quebec, and in the hən̓q̓əmin̓əm̓ dialect of Halkomelem. Both the majuscule and minuscule forms of this letter are based on the form of a turned e, while in Balinese it is not written formally but the final orthographic -a is a schwa [ə] and is sometimes represented by ǎ letter. Meanwhile, the Pan-Nigerian alphabet has a distinct letter based on a lowercase turned e (U+01DD ǝ LATIN SMALL LETTER TURNED E), paired with its uppercase version, Ǝ (U+018E Ǝ LATIN CAPITAL LETTER REVERSED E).

A superscript minuscule (U+1D4A ᵊ MODIFIER LETTER SMALL SCHWA) is used to modify the preceding consonant to have a mid central vowel release, though it is also commonly used to indicate possible syllabicity of the following sonorant, especially in transcriptions of English. The latter usage is non-standard.

In the Azerbaijani alphabet, ⟨Ə⟩ represents the near-open front unrounded vowel, /æ/, like the pronunciation of ⟨a⟩ in "cat". The letter was used in the 1992 Chechen Latin alphabet proposal, where it represented the glottal stop, /ʔ/, like the pronunciation of ⟨tt⟩ in GA "button". It was also used in the Uniform Turkic Alphabet, for example in Janalif for the Tatar language in the 1920s–1930s. Also, in a romanization of Pashto, the letter ⟨Ə⟩ is used to represent [ə]. When some Roman orthographies in the Soviet Union were converted to use the Cyrillic script in the 1930s and 1940s, this letter has been adopted verbatim.

In the Karay·a alphabet, the letter represents /ə/.

In the Latin transliteration of Avestan, the corresponding long vowel is written as schwa-macron, ⟨Ə̄ ə̄⟩.

An R-colored vowel can be represented using ⟨ɚ⟩.

A schwa with a retroflex hook ⟨ᶕ⟩ is used in phonetic transcription.

=== For gender neutrality in Italian ===
In the 2020s, the schwa has been proposed to replace the gendered suffixes of the Italian language, in order to keep words gender neutral: for example, the use of the schwa in the word tuttə (all/everyone), as opposed to tutti (all/everyone, used both as a masculine plural and as a plural without gender marking).

This niche usage is controversial—as well as mainly limited to written language, as there is no real consensus on how the -ə suffix should be pronounced—and has been criticized by the Accademia della Crusca. The president of the Accademia opposed its use, and the Accademia answered to a question posed by the Equal Opportunities Committee of the Supreme Court of Cassation for the introduction of the schwa in juridical language, stating that "juridical language is not the place to experiment with minority-led innovations that would lead to irregularity and idiolects".

== Unicode encodings ==
Character information
Preview	Ə		ə		Ǝ		ǝ		ᵊ		ₔ	
Unicode name	LATIN CAPITAL LETTER SCHWA		LATIN SMALL LETTER SCHWA		LATIN CAPITAL LETTER REVERSED E		LATIN SMALL LETTER TURNED E		MODIFIER LETTER SMALL SCHWA		LATIN SUBSCRIPT SMALL LETTER SCHWA	
Encodings	decimal	hex	dec	hex	dec	hex	dec	hex	dec	hex	dec	hex
Unicode	399	U+018F	601	U+0259	398	U+018E	477	U+01DD	7498	U+1D4A	8340	U+2094
UTF-8	198 143	C6 8F	201 153	C9 99	198 142	C6 8E	199 157	C7 9D	225 181 138	E1 B5 8A	226 130 148	E2 82 94
Numeric character reference	&#399;	&#x18F;	&#601;	&#x259;	&#398;	&#x18E;	&#477;	&#x1DD;	&#7498;	&#x1D4A;	&#8340;	&#x2094;

Since the legacy fixed 8-bit ISO/IEC Turkish encoding contains neither Ə nor ə, Ä ä has sometimes been used for the Azerbaijani language instead, as in the Tatar and Turkmen languages.

In Windows, the characters can be generated by holding the ⎇ Alt key and pressing the respective decimal Unicode number, which can be found in the table (e.g. 399, 601), on the number pad preceded by a leading 0. With a Linux compose key, the lowercase letter is by default generated by Compose+e+e.
