= Y with hook =

Latin letter Y with hook

- Ƴ ƴ

Usage
- Writing system: Latin script
- Type: alphabet
- Sound values: [j̰] [ˀj] [ʄ]

History
Development
T3
        - Υ υ
          - Y y
            - Ƴ ƴ

Ƴ (minuscule: ƴ) is a letter of the Latin alphabet, formed from Y with the addition of a hook. It is used in some African languages, such as Fula and Hausa, to represent a glottalic palatal approximant, [ˀj] or [j̰]. In Noon, a language spoken in Senegal, ƴ represents a voiced palatal implosive [ʄ].

The Unicode names and code points are as follows:

- U+01B3 Ƴ LATIN CAPITAL LETTER Y WITH HOOK
- U+01B4 ƴ LATIN SMALL LETTER Y WITH HOOK

== The placement of the hook on the capital Ƴ ==
The original Unicode charts showed the hook on the left, while most use in Africa had it on the right, as reflected in the 1978 African reference alphabet and 1979 General Alphabet of Cameroon Languages. The Unicode usage apparently followed that shown in ISO 6438, but it is not clear where the latter got it. The form used in the code charts was later changed to show the hook on the right side.

== Alternative representations ==
An alternative representation of the sound is ʼy. This is used in the orthographies of Hausa and Fula in Nigeria, while ƴ is used in Niger for Hausa, and in most of West Africa for Fula. See also: Pan-Nigerian alphabet

In the orthography for languages of Guinea (pre-1985), yh was used instead of ƴ.

== See also ==
=== Alphabets with this letter ===
- African reference alphabet
- Alphabets for the following specific languages:
  - Fula (see also Fula orthographies)
  - Hausa (only in Niger, not in Nigeria)
