= B with top bar =

Letter of the Latin alphabet

Ƃ
- Ƃ ƃ

Usage
- Writing system: Latin script
- Type: Alphabetic and logographic
- Language of origin: Zhuang languages
- Sound values: [ˀb] [ɓ]
- In Unicode: U+0182, U+0183

History
- Development: Б б: Ƃ ƃ
- Time period: 1957-1982

Other
- Writing direction: Left-to-right

The Latin letter B with top bar, Ƃ (minuscule: ƃ) is a letter of the Latin alphabet. It is similar to the Cyrillic Б б in appearance.

It was used in the Zhuang alphabet from 1957 to 1986, when it was replaced by the digraph mb. It has also sometimes been used for the uppercase form of Ɓ ɓ, for example in Shona.

The letter first appeared in Unicode version 1.1.0 in June 1993.

== See also ==
- D with top bar
