= N with long right leg =

Obsolete IPA character

Latin N with long right leg

N with long right leg (majuscule: Ƞ, minuscule: ƞ) is an obsolete letter of the Latin alphabet and the International Phonetic Alphabet. It is encoded in Unicode as U+0220 Ƞ LATIN CAPITAL LETTER N WITH LONG RIGHT LEG and U+019E ƞ LATIN SMALL LETTER N WITH LONG RIGHT LEG. It is nearly homoglyphic with the lowercase Greek letter Eta.

⟨Ƞ⟩ was used to represent the nasalization of vowels in the Lakota language in that language's 1982 orthography. Later Lakota orthography replaced the letter with ⟨ŋ⟩, a more common letter that represents a velar nasal sound in many languages.

In the IPA, the letter ⟨ƞ⟩ was used from 1951 to 1976 to transcribe a moraic nasal that is homorganic with a following consonant, but was retired after falling into disuse. The wildcard letter capital /N/ is often used for something similar today.
