= U with bar =

Letter of the Latin alphabet

Latin U with bar
Latin U with stroke

U with bar (majuscule: Ʉ, minuscule: ʉ) or barred u is a letter of the Latin alphabet, formed from U with the addition of a horizontal bar.

In the International Phonetic Alphabet, the lowercase ʉ is used to represent a close central rounded vowel.

U with stroke (majuscule: Ꞹ, minuscule: ꞹ) is an additional letter of the Latin alphabet, which is similar but distinct from U with bar, with the addition of a diagonal stroke. It is used in the Mazahua alphabet.

== Languages that use U bar ==
- Catío Emberá
- Comanche
- Kanakanavu
- Kʼicheʼ
- Koyukon
- Saaroa
- Tsou
- Yemba
- Ngiemboon
- Jju

== Computer encoding ==
Character information
Preview	Ʉ		ʉ		ᵾ		ᶶ		Ꞹ		ꞹ	
Unicode name	LATIN CAPITAL LETTER U BAR		LATIN SMALL LETTER U BAR		LATIN SMALL CAPITAL LETTER U WITH STROKE		MODIFIER LETTER SMALL U BAR		LATIN CAPITAL LETTER U WITH STROKE		LATIN SMALL LETTER U WITH STROKE	
Encodings	decimal	hex	dec	hex	dec	hex	dec	hex	dec	hex	dec	hex
Unicode	580	U+0244	649	U+0289	7550	U+1D7E	7606	U+1DB6	42936	U+A7B8	42937	U+A7B9
UTF-8	201 132	C9 84	202 137	CA 89	225 181 190	E1 B5 BE	225 182 182	E1 B6 B6	234 158 184	EA 9E B8	234 158 185	EA 9E B9
Numeric character reference	&#580;	&#x244;	&#649;	&#x289;	&#7550;	&#x1D7E;	&#7606;	&#x1DB6;	&#42936;	&#xA7B8;	&#42937;	&#xA7B9;

== See also ==
- B with Stroke (Ƀ, ƀ)
- D with stroke (Đ, đ)
- I with bar (Ɨ, ɨ)
