= Inverted breve =

Diacritical mark, ◌̑

◌̑

Inverted breve
- U+0311 ◌̑ COMBINING INVERTED BREVE

Inverted breve or arch is a diacritical mark, shaped like the top half of a circle ( ̑ ), that is, like an upside-down breve (˘). It looks similar to the circumflex (ˆ), which has a sharp tip (Â â Ê ê Î î Ô ô Û û), while the inverted breve is rounded: (Ȃ ȃ Ȇ ȇ Ȋ ȋ Ȏ ȏ Ȗ ȗ).

Inverted breve can occur above or below the letter. It is not used in any natural language alphabet. It is identical in form to the Ancient Greek circumflex.

== Uses ==
=== Serbo-Croatian ===
The inverted breve above is used in traditional Slavicist notation of Serbo-Croatian phonology to indicate long falling accent. It is placed above the syllable nucleus, which can be one of five vowels (ȃ ȇ ȋ ȏ ȗ) or syllabic ȓ. This use of the inverted breve is derived from the Ancient Greek circumflex, which was preserved in the polytonic orthography of Modern Greek and influenced early Serbian Cyrillic printing through religious literature. In the early 19th century, it began to be used in both Latin and Cyrillic as a diacritic to mark prosody in the systematic study of the Serbo-Croatian linguistic continuum.

=== International Phonetic Alphabet ===
In the International Phonetic Alphabet, an inverted breve below [or occasionally above] is used to mark a vowel as non-syllabic, i.e. assuming the role of a semivowel. The diacritic thus expands upon the four primary symbols [j, w, ɥ, ɰ] the IPA reserves for semivowels, which correspond to the full vowels [i, u, y, ɯ], respectively. Any vowel is eligible for marking as non-syllabic; a frequent use of the diacritic is in conjunction with the centralised equivalents of the vowels just mentioned: [ɪ̯, ʊ̯, ʏ̯].

The same diacritic is placed under iota ⟨ι̯⟩ to represent the Proto-Indo-European semivowel *y as it relates to Ancient Greek; upsilon with an inverted breve ⟨υ̯⟩ is also sometimes used insead of digamma ⟨ϝ⟩ to represent the Proto-Indo-European semivowel *w.

== Encoding ==
Inverted breve characters are supported in Unicode and HTML code (decimal numeric character reference).

Name	Letter	Unicode	HTML
Combining Inverted Breve	◌̑	U+0311	&#785;
Combining Inverted Breve Below	◌̯	U+032F	&#815;
Combining Double Inverted Breve	◌͡◌	U+0361	&#865;
Combining Double Inverted Breve Below	◌᷼◌	U+1DFC	&#7676;
Modifier Breve With Inverted Breve	꭛	U+AB5B	&#43867;
Latin Capital Letter A With Inverted Breve	Ȃ	U+0202	&#514;
Latin Small Letter A With Inverted Breve	ȃ	U+0203	&#515;
Latin Capital Letter E With Inverted Breve	Ȇ	U+0206	&#518;
Latin Small Letter E With Inverted Breve	ȇ	U+0207	&#519;
Latin Capital Letter I With Inverted Breve	Ȋ	U+020A	&#522;
Latin Small Letter I With Inverted Breve	ȋ	U+020B	&#523;
Latin Capital Letter O With Inverted Breve	Ȏ	U+020E	&#526;
Latin Small Letter O With Inverted Breve	ȏ	U+020F	&#527;
Latin Capital Letter R With Inverted Breve	Ȓ	U+0212	&#530;
Latin Small Letter R With Inverted Breve	ȓ	U+0213	&#531;
Latin Capital Letter U With Inverted Breve	Ȗ	U+0216	&#534;
Latin Small Letter U With Inverted Breve	ȗ	U+0217	&#535;

In LaTeX the control \textroundcap{o} with \usepackage{tipa} puts an inverted breve over the letter o.

== See also ==
- Tie (typography)
