= Latin upsilon =

Letter of the Latin alphabet

- Ʊ ʊ

Usage
- Writing system: Latin script
- Type: Alphabetic
- Sound values: [ʊ]; [u̙]
- In Unicode: U+01B1, U+028A

History
- Development: U u: ᴜ; Ʊ ʊ
- Descendants: ᵿ; ᶷ

Other
- Writing direction: Left-to-Right

Shapes of horseshoe U as designed for the African reference alphabet, clearly based on a serifed shape of the Latin capital U.

The letter Ʊ (minuscule: ʊ), called Latin upsilon or sometimes inverted omega, horseshoe u, or bucket, is a letter of the International Phonetic Alphabet used to transcribe a near-close near-back rounded vowel. Graphically, the lower case is a turned small-capital Greek letter omega (Ω) in many typefaces (e.g. Arial, Calibri, Candara, Liberation, Lucida, Noto, Times New Roman), and historically it derives from a small-capital Latin U (ᴜ), with the serifs exaggerated to make them more visible. However, Geoffrey Pullum interpreted it as an IPA variant of the Greek letter upsilon (υ) and called it Latin upsilon, the name that would be adopted by Unicode, though in IPA a letter closer to an actual Greek upsilon is also used for the voiced labiodental approximant; Pullum called this letter script V and Unicode calls it V with hook.

Horseshoe U is used in the African reference alphabet, and national alphabets such as those of Anii and Tem. It most often has the value of /u/ with retracted tongue root.

== Computer encoding ==
The majuscule and the minuscule are located at U+01B1 Ʊ LATIN CAPITAL LETTER UPSILON and U+028A ʊ LATIN SMALL LETTER UPSILON in Unicode.

Derived characters are U+1DB7 ᶷ MODIFIER LETTER SMALL UPSILON and U+1D7F ᵿ LATIN SMALL LETTER UPSILON WITH STROKE.

== See also ==
- Mho (℧)
- Ou (ligature), the Greek ligature of omicron (ο) and upsilon (υ), sometimes written as (℧)
