= Ƀ =

Letter of the Latin alphabet

B with stroke
- Ƀ ƀ

Usage
- Writing system: Latin
- Type: Alphabet
- Language of origin: Rade language, Jarai language, Mnong language, Kiowa language, Old English language, Old Saxon language, Pilagá language
- Sound values: [β]; [v]; [b͉]; [b]; [ʔb]
- In Unicode: U+0243, U+0180

History
Development
O1
        - Β β
          - 𐌁
                - B b
                  - Ƀ ƀ
- Sisters: β

Other
- Writing direction: Left to right

B with stroke (majuscule: Ƀ, minuscule: ƀ) is a letter of the Latin alphabet, formed from ⟨B⟩ with the addition of a bar, which can be through either the ascender or the bowl. It is sometimes used as a phonetic symbol to represent the sound [β].

⟨Ƀ⟩ is also a letter of the alphabets of the Rade, Jarai and Mnong languages and the SIL alphabet of the Katu language of Vietnam, the Panamanian spelling of the Northern Embera language, and is used in standardized texts in Old Saxon for [v] as well as in reconstructed forms of Proto-Germanic.

== Unicode ==
The minuscule form has been present in Unicode since version 1 (1991), but the majuscule form was not added until version 5 (2006).

Character information
Preview	Ƀ		ƀ	
Unicode name	LATIN CAPITAL LETTER B WITH STROKE		LATIN SMALL LETTER B WITH STROKE	
Encodings	decimal	hex	dec	hex
Unicode	579	U+0243	384	U+0180
UTF-8	201 131	C9 83	198 128	C6 80
Numeric character reference	&#579;	&#x243;	&#384;	&#x180;

== Bitcoin ==
Before the introduction of the Unicode symbol, ⟨₿⟩ (U+20BF), for the popular cryptocurrency Bitcoin, the symbol for the Thai baht, ⟨฿⟩ (U+0E3F), had sometimes been used. However, this caused possible confusion with the baht while ⟨Ƀ⟩ had no other uses related to currency. Therefore, ⟨Ƀ⟩ had been proposed as a substitute.
