= J with stroke =

Letter of the Latin alphabet

- Ɉ ɉ
- ɟ, ʄ, ᶡ, 𐞘

Usage
- Writing system: Latin script
- Type: Alphabetic
- Sound values: [j̠] [ɟ] [d͡ʒ]
- In Unicode: U+0248, U+0249
- Alphabetical position: 9

History
Development
D36
          - Ιι
            - 𐌉
              - I
                - J
                  - Ɉ ɉ
- Sisters: І Ɨ Ї Ј י ي ܝ ی ࠉ य ዪ Ⴢ ⴢ Ჲ য ય
- Variations: ɟ, ʄ, ᶡ, 𐞘

Other
- Writing direction: Left-to-Right

J with stroke (majuscule Ɉ, minuscule ɉ) is a letter of the Latin alphabet, derived from J with the addition of a bar through the letter.

It is used in the Arhuaco alphabet in Colombia to represent /dʒ/, like j in English just, and in Oniyan when written with the Guinean languages alphabet in Guinea. It was formerly used in Tuvan before 1931.

A similar letter ⟨ɟ⟩ (dotless j with stroke) is used to represent a voiced palatal plosive in the International Phonetic Alphabet.

== Code positions ==
Character information
Preview	Ɉ		ɉ		ɟ		ʄ	
Unicode name	LATIN CAPITAL LETTER J WITH STROKE		LATIN SMALL LETTER J WITH STROKE		LATIN SMALL LETTER DOTLESS J WITH STROKE		LATIN SMALL LETTER DOTLESS J WITH STROKE AND HOOK	
Encodings	decimal	hex	dec	hex	dec	hex	dec	hex
Unicode	584	U+0248	585	U+0249	607	U+025F	644	U+0284
UTF-8	201 136	C9 88	201 137	C9 89	201 159	C9 9F	202 132	CA 84
Numeric character reference	&#584;	&#x248;	&#585;	&#x249;	&#607;	&#x25F;	&#644;	&#x284;

Character information
Preview	ᶡ		𐞘	
Unicode name	MODIFIER LETTER SMALL DOTLESS J WITH STROKE		MODIFIER LETTER SMALL DOTLESS J WITH STROKE AND HOOK	
Encodings	decimal	hex	dec	hex
Unicode	7585	U+1DA1	67480	U+10798
UTF-8	225 182 161	E1 B6 A1	240 144 158 152	F0 90 9E 98
UTF-16	7585	1DA1	55297 57240	D801 DF98
Numeric character reference	&#7585;	&#x1DA1;	&#67480;	&#x10798;
