= Ʈ =

Latin letter T with retroflex hook

Latin T with retroflex hook

The letter Ʈ (minuscule: ʈ), called T with retroflex hook (in some literature, T with right tail or Right-tail T), is a letter of the Latin alphabet based on the letter t. It is used to represent a voiceless retroflex plosive in the International Phonetic Alphabet, and is used in the 1978 African Reference Alphabet to be used in alphabets of some African languages. A ligature of ʈ with h was part of the Initial Teaching Alphabet to represent the voiceless dental fricative.

Several letters with retroflex hook (ʈ, ɖ, ɭ, ɳ, ɽ, ʂ, ʐ) were proposed as phonetic symbols for retroflex consonants at the 1925 Copenhagen conference of April 1925, following their use in Johan August Lundell's Swedish Dialect Alphabet. They were adopted in the International Phonetic Alphabet in 1927.

J. P. Crazzolara used the letter ʈ in the Nuer orthography of Outline of a Nuer Grammar published in 1933 and J. Kiggen in the orthography used in the Nuer-English Dictionary published in 1948. Crazzolara also used the letter in Acholi and Luo.

== Computer encoding ==
The majuscule and the minuscule are located at U+01AE Ʈ LATIN CAPITAL LETTER T WITH RETROFLEX HOOK and U+0288 ʈ LATIN SMALL LETTER T WITH RETROFLEX HOOK in Unicode.
