= G with hook =

Latin letter G with hook

- Ɠ ɠ

Usage
- Writing system: Latin script
- Type: alphabetic
- Language of origin: African Reference Alphabet
- Sound values: [ɠ]
- In Unicode: U+0193, U+0260
- Alphabetical position: 19th

History
Development
(speculated origin)
  T14
          - Γ γ
            - 𐌂
              - C
                - G
                  - Ɠ ɠ

G with hook (majuscule: Ɠ, minuscule: ɠ) is a letter of the extended Latin alphabet. In the International Phonetic Alphabet, its small caps form (U+029B ʛ LATIN LETTER SMALL CAPITAL G WITH HOOK) represents the voiced uvular implosive and its lowercase form represents the voiced velar implosive. Because it occurs in the orthographies of some African languages, including some unofficial orthographies of Fula, it is included in the African reference alphabet.

== Unicode ==
In Unicode, the majuscule Ɠ is encoded in the Latin Extended-B block at U+0193 Ɠ LATIN CAPITAL LETTER G WITH HOOK and the minuscule ɠ is encoded at U+0260 ɠ LATIN SMALL LETTER G WITH HOOK.

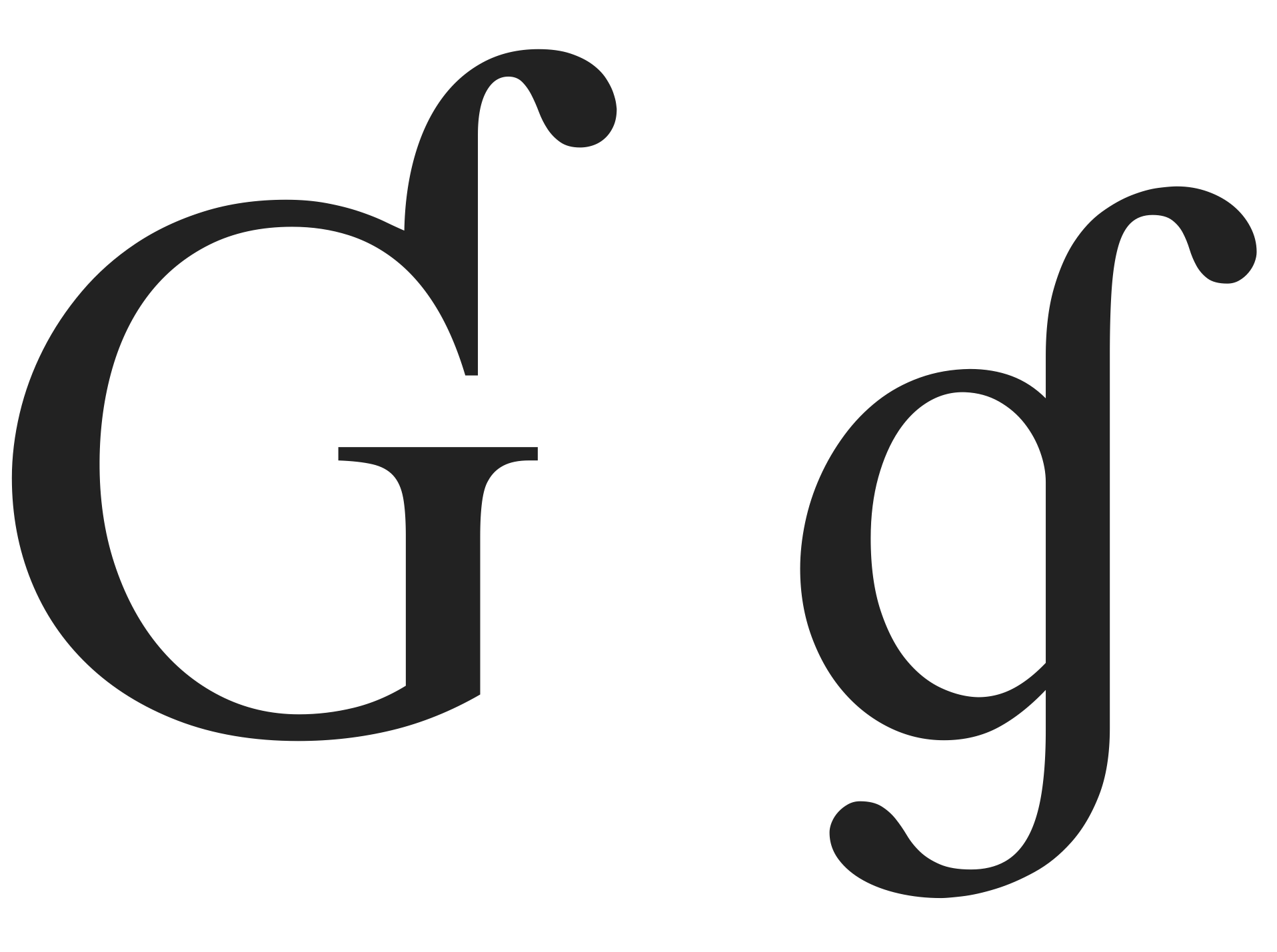
Doulos SIL glyphs for Majuscule and minuscule Ɠɠ.

== See also ==
- Writing systems of Africa (section on Latin script)
- Ɓ
- Ɗ
