= T with hook =

Latin letter T with hook

Latin T with hook

The letter Ƭ (minuscule: ƭ), called T with hook, is a letter of the Latin alphabet based on the letter t. It is used in the Serer language and was suggested as part of the African Reference Alphabet.

Its lower case form, ⟨ƭ⟩, formerly represented a voiceless alveolar implosive in the International Phonetic Alphabet; it was withdrawn in 1993.

The uppercase is in the Latin Extended-B range and the lowercase is in the IPA range.

== Encoding ==
In Unicode, the majuscule and the minuscule are located at U+01AC Ƭ LATIN CAPITAL LETTER T WITH HOOK and U+01AD ƭ LATIN SMALL LETTER T WITH HOOK.
