= K with hook =

Latin letter K with hook

Traditional uppercase and lowercase K with hook.

Wrong and preferred uppercase K with hook

Wrong and preferred lowercase K with hook

Ƙ (minuscule: ƙ) is a letter of the Latin alphabet, used in Hausa and Karai-karai to represent an ejective [kʼ].

It was formerly used in the International Phonetic Alphabet to represent a voiceless velar implosive (currently [ɠ̊]). It was withdrawn in 1993.

== Encoding ==
It is encoded in Unicode at U+0198 Ƙ LATIN CAPITAL LETTER K WITH HOOK, and U+0199 ƙ LATIN SMALL LETTER K WITH HOOK.

In ISO 6438, K with hook is encoded as:

- Ƙ: C0
- ƙ: D0

== See also ==
=== Alphabets with this letter ===
- African reference alphabet
- Pan-Nigerian alphabet
- Alphabets for the following specific languages
  - Hausa
