= I with bar =

Letter of the Latin alphabet

Latin I with bar

I with bar (majuscule: Ɨ, minuscule: ɨ) is a letter of the Latin alphabet, formed from I or i with the addition of a bar.

In the International Phonetic Alphabet, ⟨ɨ⟩ is used to represent a close central unrounded vowel. In American linguistic tradition (such as in Americanist phonetic notation), it is used to represent the weak vowel heard in the second syllable of roses when distinct from Rosa's. For related uses of the small capital barred i, see near-close central unrounded vowel.

The ISO 6438 (African coded character set for bibliographic information interchange) gives lowercase of Ɨ as ɪ, a small capital I, not ɨ.

== Unicode ==
- U+0197 Ɨ LATIN CAPITAL LETTER I WITH STROKE
- U+0268 ɨ LATIN SMALL LETTER I WITH STROKE
- U+1D7B ᵻ LATIN SMALL CAPITAL LETTER I WITH STROKE
- U+1DA4 ᶤ MODIFIER LETTER SMALL I WITH STROKE
- U+1DA7 ᶧ MODIFIER LETTER SMALL CAPITAL I WITH STROKE

== Variations ==
Ɨ̆ ɨ̆
Ɨ̆ ɨ̆
Ɨ́ ɨ́
Ɨ́ ɨ́

ɨ̆, small barred i written with a breve, represents a very short close central unrounded vowel. The breve indicates a very short, or overshort vowel.

In the Golin language, ɨ̆ is used in the IPA transcription of the very short high central epenthetic vowel phone, which is restricted to syllables closing with a sonorant.

In the Malayalam language, '്' is a symbol used to represent the IPA for ɨ̆.

Barred i is found written with an acute accent (majuscule: Ɨ́, minuscule: ɨ́) in the orthographies of several languages: Cora, Kenyang, Mfumte, etc. Depending on the language, the accent diacritic serves either to indicate the location of a word's primary stress or to mark rising tone.

== See also ==
- U+026B ɫ LATIN SMALL LETTER L WITH MIDDLE TILDE
- L with stroke (Ł, ł)
- D with stroke (Đ, đ)
- U with bar (Ʉ, ʉ)
- J with stroke (Ɉ, ɉ)
- T with stroke (Ŧ, ŧ)
- Yery (Ы, ы)
