= G with stroke =

Letter of the Latin alphabet

The stroke can be through different parts of the letter, like the Skolt Sámi variation on the left or the Kadiweu variation on the right

Ǥ (lowercase ǥ), referred to by Unicode as a G with stroke, is a letter used in alphabets for Skolt Sámi in Fennoscandia, Kiowa in North America, Kadiwéu in South America. The position of the stroke within the letter can vary, either due to the particular typeface being used, or due to a preference within the language's writing system (e.g., written Skolt Sami places the stroke lower than Kadiwéu does).

In the Latin alphabet for Skolt Sámi, G with stroke denotes the voiced velar fricative /ɣ/. It is sometimes pronounced as a voiced velar approximant /ɰ/ instead. It appears word-medially and word-finally, and often appears as a double letter ǥǥ to indicate that the sound is phonemically geminate, as in čååǥǥam "comb" or šiõǥǥ "good".

It is also used in some orthographies for the Kiowa language, where it represents a voiceless but unaspirated velar stop /k/ (similar to the k sounds in English skate).

In Kadiwéu, G with stroke is used to represent the voiced uvular stop /ɢ/, which may also be pronounced as the voiced uvular fricative [ʁ].

The letter has also been used to write Proto-Germanic, Northern Sámi (in Nils Vibe Stockfleth's 1839 orthography), and in the Old Icelandic orthography proposed in the First Grammatical Treatise, where it represented a velar nasal.

An early version of the International Phonetic Alphabet used a character similar to ǥ to stand for the voiced velar fricative [ɣ], although the IPA's representation of the character had a slightly tilted stroke and a slightly bent descender on the g.

== Computer encoding ==
Character information
Preview	Ǥ		ǥ	
Unicode name	LATIN CAPITAL LETTER G WITH STROKE		LATIN SMALL LETTER G WITH STROKE	
Encodings	decimal	hex	dec	hex
Unicode	484	U+01E4	485	U+01E5
UTF-8	199 164	C7 A4	199 165	C7 A5
Numeric character reference	&#484;	&#x1E4;	&#485;	&#x1E5;
