= Turned e =

Latin letter turned E

- Ǝ ǝ

Usage
- Writing system: Latin script
- Sound values: [ɛ]; [e]; [ə]

History
- Development: E e: Ǝ ǝ

Ǝ ǝo

Turned e
- In Unicode: U+018E Ǝ LATIN CAPITAL LETTER REVERSED E U+01DD ǝ LATIN SMALL LETTER TURNED E

Different from
- Different from: U+2203 ∃ THERE EXISTS; U+0259 ə LATIN SMALL LETTER SCHWA

Related
- See also: U+018F Ə LATIN CAPITAL LETTER SCHWA

The letter compared with E/e, in fonts Arial, Times New Roman, Cambria and Gentium

Ǝ ǝ (turned E or reversed E) is an additional letter of the Latin alphabet used in African languages using the Pan-Nigerian alphabet. The minuscule is based on a rotated e and the capital form majuscule Ǝ, based on a reversed (mirrored) majuscule E.

It is not to be confused with U+0259 ə LATIN SMALL LETTER SCHWA (uppercase Ə), which is used as a phonetic symbol for the mid central vowel and as a letter in Latin-based orthographies (such as Azerbaijani and the General Alphabet of Cameroon Languages), or with U+2203 ∃ THERE EXISTS, the existential quantifier used in logic.

In MacOS with the U.S. Extended keyboard, the letters Ǝ ǝ are made with ⌥ Opt+⇧ Shift+: followed by E e respectively.

== Unicode encodings ==
Character information
Preview	Ǝ		ǝ	
Unicode name	LATIN CAPITAL LETTER REVERSED E		LATIN SMALL LETTER TURNED E	
Encodings	decimal	hex	dec	hex
Unicode	398	U+018E	477	U+01DD
UTF-8	198 142	C6 8E	199 157	C7 9D
Numeric character reference	&#398;	&#x18E;	&#477;	&#x1DD;
