= P with hook =

Latin letter P with hook

- Ƥ ƥ

Usage
- Writing system: Latin script
- Type: alphabetic
- Language of origin: Serer language
- Sound values: [ɓ̥]
- In Unicode: U+01A4, U+01A5

The letter Ƥ (minuscule: ƥ), called P with hook, is a letter of the Latin alphabet based on the letter p. It is used in some alphabets of African languages such as Serer.

The minuscule ƥ was formerly used in the International Phonetic Alphabet to represent a voiceless bilabial implosive (current IPA: [ɓ̥]). It was withdrawn in 1993.

The minuscule variant resembles a lowercase thorn (þ).

== Computer encoding ==
The majuscule and the minuscule are located at U+01A4 and U+01A5 in Unicode, respectively.

Character information
Preview	Ƥ		ƥ	
Unicode name	LATIN CAPITAL LETTER P WITH HOOK		LATIN SMALL LETTER P WITH HOOK	
Encodings	decimal	hex	dec	hex
Unicode	420	U+01A4	421	U+01A5
UTF-8	198 164	C6 A4	198 165	C6 A5
Numeric character reference	&#420;	&#x1A4;	&#421;	&#x1A5;
