= B with hook =

Latin letter B with hook

- Ɓ ɓ
- Ƃ ƃ

Usage
- Writing system: Latin
- Type: Alphabetic
- Language of origin: Fula language, Hausa language, Maore Comorian language, Ngas language, Zulu language (obsolete)
- Sound values: [ɓ]
- In Unicode: U+0181, U+0253

History
Development
O1
        - Β β
          - 𐌁
                - B b
                  - Ɓ ɓ
- Variations: Ƃ ƃ

Other
- Writing direction: Left-to-right

Ɓ (minuscule: ɓ), called B-hook or B with hook, is a letter of the Latin alphabet and the International African Alphabet. Its lower-case form, ⟨ɓ⟩, represents a voiced bilabial implosive in the International Phonetic Alphabet. It is used to spell that sound in various languages, notably Fula, Hausa, and Giziga. It was also formerly used in, or at least proposed for, Xhosa and Zulu.

In Unicode, the upper case Ɓ is in the Latin Extended B range (U+0181), and the lower case ɓ is in the IPA range (U+0253). In Shona, the upper case form is a just a larger form of the lower case letter.

== Alternative or obsolete capital form ==
The Practical Orthography for African Languages (1930 ed.) used a different capital form, similar to the Cyrillic letter be (Б). A New Testament in the Loma language of Liberia, which was typeset in 1971, used this capital form.

== Encoding ==
Character information
Preview	Ɓ		ɓ	
Unicode name	LATIN CAPITAL LETTER B WITH HOOK		LATIN SMALL LETTER B WITH HOOK	
Encodings	decimal	hex	dec	hex
Unicode	385	U+0181	595	U+0253
UTF-8	198 129	C6 81	201 147	C9 93
Numeric character reference	&#385;	&#x181;	&#595;	&#x253;

== See also ==
=== Similar letters ===
- Ƃ ƃ (Zhuang)
- Б б (Cyrillic)
- ᵷ (lowercase turned g)

=== Alphabets with this letter ===
- Africa Alphabet
- African reference alphabet
- Pan-Nigerian alphabet
- Alphabets for the following specific languages:
  - Fula (see also Fula orthographies)
  - Hausa
  - Giziga

== Bibliography ==
- Pullum, Geoffrey K.; Ladusaw, William A. (1996). Phonetic Symbol Guide. University of Chicago Press. p. 23.
- "Latin Extended B: Range 0180-024F" (Unicode code chart)
- "IPA Extensions: Range 0250-02AF" (Unicode code chart)
