= Barred o =

Letter in several Latin-script alphabets

O with bar
- Ɵ ɵ

Usage
- Writing system: Latin script
- Type: alphabetic
- Language of origin: Yañalif; Buryat language
- Sound values: [œ]; [ø]; [ɵ]
- In Unicode: U+019F, U+0275

History
Development
D4
      - Ο ο
        - 𐌏
          - Ɵ ɵ

Other
- Writing direction: Left to right

Barred o (capital: Ɵ, lowercase: ɵ) is a letter in several Latin-script alphabets.

Historic examples include the Azerbaijani alphabet used between 1922 and 1933 and its successor, the Uniform Turkic Alphabet (including its versions like Jaꞑalif and the Azerbaijani alphabet used between 1933 and 1939), in which it represented the open-mid front rounded vowel [œ].

In many alphabets it was replaced by the Cyrillic letter Ө ө in 1939. In Azerbaijani, it was again replaced by the Latin letter Ö ö in 1991.

The Tatar Latin alphabet devised in the late 1990s by the Tatarstan authorities included the letter Ɵ ɵ. The letter is also part of the African reference alphabet.

In the International Phonetic Alphabet, the lowercase [ɵ] (originally a closed e, later reinterpreted as a barred o) represents the close-mid central rounded vowel.

The letter is not to be confused with the slashed zero, slashed O (Ø ø), the similar Latin letter Ꝋ ꝋ, the Cyrillic letters fita (Ѳ ѳ) and Oe (Ө ө), the Greek theta (Θ θ), Tifinagh letter yab (ⴱ), or the Plimsoll symbol (⦵), despite their similar shapes.

== Unicode ==
Character information
Preview	Ɵ		ɵ		ᶱ	
Unicode name	LATIN CAPITAL LETTER O WITH MIDDLE TILDE		LATIN SMALL LETTER BARRED O		MODIFIER LETTER SMALL BARRED O	
Encodings	decimal	hex	dec	hex	dec	hex
Unicode	415	U+019F	629	U+0275	7601	U+1DB1
UTF-8	198 159	C6 9F	201 181	C9 B5	225 182 177	E1 B6 B1
Numeric character reference	&#415;	&#x19F;	&#629;	&#x275;	&#7601;	&#x1DB1;
