= IPA Extensions =

- Range: U+0250..U+02AF (96 code points)
- Plane: BMP
- Scripts: Latin
- Major alphabets: IPA
- Assigned: 96 code points
- Unused: 0 reserved code points

Unicode Version History
- 1.0.0 (1991): 89 (+89)
- 3.0 (1999): 94 (+5)
- 4.0 (2003): 96 (+2)

Unicode documentation
- Code chart ∣ Web page

IPA Extensions is a block (U+0250–U+02AF) of the Unicode standard that contains full size letters used in the International Phonetic Alphabet (IPA). Both modern and historical characters are included, as well as former and proposed IPA signs and non-IPA phonetic letters. Additional characters employed for phonetics, like the palatalization sign, are encoded in the blocks Phonetic Extensions (1D00–1D7F) and Phonetic Extensions Supplement (1D80–1DBF). Diacritics are found in the Spacing Modifier Letters (02B0–02FF) and Combining Diacritical Marks (0300–036F) blocks. Its block name in Unicode 1.0 was Standard Phonetic.

With the ability to use Unicode for the presentation of IPA symbols, ASCII-based systems such as X-SAMPA are being supplanted. Within the Unicode blocks there are also a few former IPA characters no longer in international use by linguists.

== Character table ==
Code	Glyph	HTML	Unicode name	IPA phonetic description / Status	IPA No.
IPA letters
U+0250	ɐ	&#592;	Latin Small Letter Turned A	Near-open central vowel	324
U+0251	ɑ	&#593;	Latin Small Letter Alpha	Open back unrounded vowel	305
U+0252	ɒ	&#594;	Latin Small Letter Turned Alpha	Open back rounded vowel	313
U+0253	ɓ	&#595;	Latin Small Letter B with Hook	Voiced bilabial implosive	160
U+0254	ɔ	&#596;	Latin Small Letter Open O	Open-mid back rounded vowel	306
U+0255	ɕ	&#597;	Latin Small Letter C with Curl	Voiceless alveolo-palatal fricative	182
U+0256	ɖ	&#598;	Latin Small Letter D with Tail	Voiced retroflex plosive	106
U+0257	ɗ	&#599;	Latin Small Letter D with Hook	Voiced alveolar implosive	162
U+0258	ɘ	&#600;	Latin Small Letter Reversed E	Close-mid central unrounded vowel	397
U+0259	ə	&#601;	Latin Small Letter Schwa	Mid central vowel	322
U+025A	ɚ	&#602;	Latin Small Letter Schwa with Hook	Rhotacized mid central vowel	327
U+025B	ɛ	&#603;	Latin Small Letter Open E	Open-mid front unrounded vowel	303
U+025C	ɜ	&#604;	Latin Small Letter Reversed Open E	Open-mid central unrounded vowel	326
U+025D	ɝ	&#605;	Latin Small Letter Reversed Open E with Hook	Rhotacized open-mid central unrounded vowel	
U+025E	ɞ	&#606;	Latin Small Letter Closed Reversed Open E	Open-mid central rounded vowel	395
U+025F	ɟ	&#607;	Latin Small Letter Dotless J with Stroke	Voiced palatal plosive	108
U+0260	ɠ	&#608;	Latin Small Letter G with Hook	Voiced velar implosive	166
U+0261	ɡ	&#609;	Latin Small Letter Script G	Voiced velar plosive	110
U+0262	ɢ	&#610;	Latin Letter Small Capital G	Voiced uvular plosive	112
U+0263	ɣ	&#611;	Latin Small Letter Gamma	Voiced velar fricative	141
U+0264	ɤ	&#612;	Latin Small Letter Rams Horn	Close-mid back unrounded vowel	315
U+0265	ɥ	&#613;	Latin Small Letter Turned H	Labial-palatal approximant	171
U+0266	ɦ	&#614;	Latin Small Letter H with Hook	Voiced glottal fricative	147
U+0267	ɧ	&#615;	Latin Small Letter Heng with Hook	Swedish sj-sound. Similar to: voiceless postalveolar fricative, voiceless velar fricative	175
U+0268	ɨ	&#616;	Latin Small Letter I with Stroke	Close central unrounded vowel	317
U+0269	ɩ	&#617;	Latin Small Letter Iota	Pre-1989 form of "ɪ" (obsolete)	399
U+026A	ɪ	&#618;	Latin Letter Small Capital I	Near-close near-front unrounded vowel	319
U+026B	ɫ	&#619;	Latin Small Letter L with Middle Tilde	Velar/pharyngeal alveolar lateral approximant	209
U+026C	ɬ	&#620;	Latin Small Letter L with Belt	Voiceless alveolar lateral fricative	148
U+026D	ɭ	&#621;	Latin Small Letter L with Retroflex Hook	Retroflex lateral approximant	156
U+026E	ɮ	&#622;	Latin Small Letter Lezh	Voiced alveolar lateral fricative	149
U+026F	ɯ	&#623;	Latin Small Letter Turned M	Close back unrounded vowel	316
U+0270	ɰ	&#624;	Latin Small Letter Turned M with Long Leg	Velar approximant	154
U+0271	ɱ	&#625;	Latin Small Letter M with Hook	Labiodental nasal	115
U+0272	ɲ	&#626;	Latin Small Letter N with Left Hook	Palatal nasal	118
U+0273	ɳ	&#627;	Latin Small Letter N with Retroflex Hook	Retroflex nasal	117
U+0274	ɴ	&#628;	Latin Letter Small Capital N	Uvular nasal	120
U+0275	ɵ	&#629;	Latin Small Letter Barred O	Close-mid central rounded vowel	323
U+0276	ɶ	&#630;	Latin Letter Small Capital OE	Open front rounded vowel	312
U+0277	ɷ	&#631;	Latin Small Letter Closed Omega	Pre-1989 form of "ʊ" (obsolete)	398
U+0278	ɸ	&#632;	Latin Small Letter Phi	Voiceless bilabial fricative	126
U+0279	ɹ	&#633;	Latin Small Letter Turned R	Alveolar approximant	151
U+027A	ɺ	&#634;	Latin Small Letter Turned R with Long Leg	Alveolar lateral flap	181
U+027B	ɻ	&#635;	Latin Small Letter Turned R with Hook	Retroflex approximant	152
U+027C	ɼ	&#636;	Latin Small Letter R with Long Leg	Alveolar trill	206
U+027D	ɽ	&#637;	Latin Small Letter R with Tail	Retroflex flap	125
U+027E	ɾ	&#638;	Latin Small Letter R with Fishhook	Alveolar tap	124
U+027F	ɿ	&#639;	Latin Small Letter Reversed R with Fishhook	Syllabic voiced alveolar fricative (Sinologist usage)	
U+0280	ʀ	&#640;	Latin Letter Small Capital R	Uvular trill	123
U+0281	ʁ	&#641;	Latin Letter Small Capital Inverted R	Voiced uvular fricative	143
U+0282	ʂ	&#642;	Latin Small Letter S with Hook	Voiceless retroflex fricative	136
U+0283	ʃ	&#643;	Latin Small Letter Esh	Voiceless postalveolar fricative	134
U+0284	ʄ	&#644;	Latin Small Letter Dotless J with Stroke and Hook	Voiced palatal implosive	164
U+0285	ʅ	&#645;	Latin Small Letter Squat Reversed Esh	Syllabic voiced retroflex fricative (Sinologist usage)	
U+0286	ʆ	&#646;	Latin Small Letter Esh with Curl	Voiceless alveolo-palatal fricative (obsolete)	204
U+0287	ʇ	&#647;	Latin Small Letter Turned T	Dental click (obsolete)	201
U+0288	ʈ	&#648;	Latin Small Letter T with Retroflex Hook	Voiceless retroflex plosive	105
U+0289	ʉ	&#649;	Latin Small Letter U Bar	Close central rounded vowel	318
U+028A	ʊ	&#650;	Latin Small Letter Upsilon	Near-close near-back rounded vowel	321
U+028B	ʋ	&#651;	Latin Small Letter V with Hook	Labiodental approximant	150
U+028C	ʌ	&#652;	Latin Small Letter Turned V	Open-mid back unrounded vowel	314
U+028D	ʍ	&#653;	Latin Small Letter Turned W	Voiceless labiovelar approximant	169
U+028E	ʎ	&#654;	Latin Small Letter Turned Y	Palatal lateral approximant	157
U+028F	ʏ	&#655;	Latin Letter Small Capital Y	Near-close near-front rounded vowel	320
U+0290	ʐ	&#656;	Latin Small Letter Z with Retroflex Hook	Voiced retroflex fricative	137
U+0291	ʑ	&#657;	Latin Small Letter Z with Curl	Voiced alveolo-palatal fricative	183
U+0292	ʒ	&#658;	Latin Small Letter Ezh	Voiced postalveolar fricative	135
U+0293	ʓ	&#659;	Latin Small Letter Ezh with Curl	Voiced alveolo-palatal fricative (obsolete)	205
U+0294	ʔ	&#660;	Latin Letter Glottal Stop	Glottal stop	113
U+0295	ʕ	&#661;	Latin Letter Pharyngeal Voiced Fricative	Voiced pharyngeal fricative	145
U+0296	ʖ	&#662;	Latin Letter Inverted Glottal Stop	Alveolar lateral click (obsolete)	203
U+0297	ʗ	&#663;	Latin Letter Stretched C	Postalveolar click (obsolete)	202
U+0298	ʘ	&#664;	Latin Letter Bilabial Click	Bilabial click	176
U+0299	ʙ	&#665;	Latin Letter Small Capital B	Bilabial trill	121
U+029A	ʚ	&#666;	Latin Small Letter Closed Open E	Open-mid central rounded vowel	396
U+029B	ʛ	&#667;	Latin Letter Small Capital G with Hook	Voiced uvular implosive	168
U+029C	ʜ	&#668;	Latin Letter Small Capital H	Voiceless epiglottal fricative	172
U+029D	ʝ	&#669;	Latin Small Letter J with Crossed Tail	Voiced palatal fricative	139
U+029E	ʞ	&#670;	Latin Small Letter Turned K	Velar click (obsolete)	291
U+029F	ʟ	&#671;	Latin Letter Small Capital L	Velar lateral approximant	158
U+02A0	ʠ	&#672;	Latin Small Letter Q with Hook	"Voiceless" uvular implosive (obsolete)	167
U+02A1	ʡ	&#673;	Latin Letter Glottal Stop with Stroke	Epiglottal plosive	173
U+02A2	ʢ	&#674;	Latin Letter Reversed Glottal Stop with Stroke	Voiced epiglottal fricative	174
U+02A3	ʣ	&#675;	Latin Small Letter DZ Digraph	Voiced alveolar affricate (obsolete)	212
U+02A4	ʤ	&#676;	Latin Small Letter Dezh Digraph	Voiced postalveolar affricate (obsolete)	214
U+02A5	ʥ	&#677;	Latin Small Letter DZ Digraph with Curl	Voiced alveolo-palatal affricate (obsolete)	216
U+02A6	ʦ	&#678;	Latin Small Letter TS Digraph	Voiceless alveolar affricate (obsolete)	211
U+02A7	ʧ	&#679;	Latin Small Letter Tesh Digraph	Voiceless postalveolar affricate (obsolete)	213
U+02A8	ʨ	&#680;	Latin Small Letter TC Digraph with Curl	Voiceless alveolo-palatal affricate (obsolete)	215
IPA characters for disordered speech
U+02A9	ʩ	&#681;	Latin Small Letter Feng Digraph	Velopharyngeal fricative	602
U+02AA	ʪ	&#682;	Latin Small Letter LS Digraph	Voiceless grooved lateral alveolar fricative	603
U+02AB	ʫ	&#683;	Latin Small Letter LZ Digraph	Voiced grooved lateral alveolar fricative	604
U+02AC	ʬ	&#684;	Latin Letter Bilabial Percussive	Bilabial percussive	
U+02AD	ʭ	&#685;	Latin Letter Bidental Percussive	Bidental percussive	601
Additions for Sinology
U+02AE	ʮ	&#686;	Latin Small Letter Turned H with Fishhook	Syllabic labialized voiced alveolar fricative (Sinologist usage)	
U+02AF	ʯ	&#687;	Latin Small Letter Turned H with Fishhook and Tail	Syllabic labialized voiced retroflex fricative (Sinologist usage)	

== Subheadings ==
The IPA Extensions block contains only three subheadings, each associated with a set of characters encoded in a different version of Unicode, IPA extensions, IPA characters for disordered speech, and Additions for Sinology.

=== IPA extensions ===
The IPA extensions are the first 89 characters of the IPA Extensions block, which includes Latin character variants and Greek borrowings that are regularly used only in IPA contexts. The characters of the IPA extensions subheading were part of the original Unicode 1.0.

=== IPA characters for disordered speech ===
The extIPA characters for disordered speech are additions to the IPA for phonemes that do not occur in natural languages, but are needed for recording pre-linguistic utterances by babies, gibberish from otherwise lingual individuals, and other non-linguistic but phonetic utterances. The IPA characters for disordered speech were added to the IPA Extensions block in Unicode version 3.0.

=== Additions for Sinology ===
The Additions for Sinology are two additional symbols for phonemic transcription of the languages of China. The Additions for Sinology were added to the IPA Extensions block in Unicode version 4.0.

== Compact table ==
IPA Extensions^{[1]} Official Unicode Consortium code chart (PDF)
	0	1	2	3	4	5	6	7	8	9	A	B	C	D	E	F
U+025x	ɐ	ɑ	ɒ	ɓ	ɔ	ɕ	ɖ	ɗ	ɘ	ə	ɚ	ɛ	ɜ	ɝ	ɞ	ɟ
U+026x	ɠ	ɡ	ɢ	ɣ	ɤ	ɥ	ɦ	ɧ	ɨ	ɩ	ɪ	ɫ	ɬ	ɭ	ɮ	ɯ
U+027x	ɰ	ɱ	ɲ	ɳ	ɴ	ɵ	ɶ	ɷ	ɸ	ɹ	ɺ	ɻ	ɼ	ɽ	ɾ	ɿ
U+028x	ʀ	ʁ	ʂ	ʃ	ʄ	ʅ	ʆ	ʇ	ʈ	ʉ	ʊ	ʋ	ʌ	ʍ	ʎ	ʏ
U+029x	ʐ	ʑ	ʒ	ʓ	ʔ	ʕ	ʖ	ʗ	ʘ	ʙ	ʚ	ʛ	ʜ	ʝ	ʞ	ʟ
U+02Ax	ʠ	ʡ	ʢ	ʣ	ʤ	ʥ	ʦ	ʧ	ʨ	ʩ	ʪ	ʫ	ʬ	ʭ	ʮ	ʯ
Notes 1.As of Unicode version 17.0

== History ==
The IPA Extensions block has been present in Unicode since version 1.0, and was unchanged through the unification with ISO 10646. The block was filled out with extensions for representing disordered speech in version 3.0, and Sinological phonetic symbols in version 4.0.

The following Unicode-related documents record the purpose and process of defining specific characters in the IPA Extensions block:

Version	Final code points (Note: Proposed code points and characters names may differ from final code points and names)	Count	UTC ID	L2 ID	WG2 ID	Document
1.0.0	U+0250..0296	71				(to be determined)
1.0.0	U+0250..0296	71		X3L2/95-090	N1253 (doc, txt)	Umamaheswaran, V. S.; Ksar, Mike (1995-09-09), "4.2", Unconfirmed Minutes of WG 2 Meeting # 28 in Helsinki, Finland; 1995-06-26--27
1.0.0	U+0250..0296	71		L2/05-212		Davis, Mark (2005-08-05), Background Information on IPA
1.0.0	U+0250..0296	71		L2/07-022	N3219	Priest, Lorna; Aumann, Greg (2007-01-12), Glyph corrections for U+027F and U+0285 in TUS
1.0.0	U+0250..0296	71		L2/07-015		Moore, Lisa (2007-02-08), "Glyph corrections for U+027F and U+0285 (C.7)", UTC #110 Minutes
1.0.0	U+0250..0296	71		L2/07-268	N3253 (pdf, doc)	Umamaheswaran, V. S. (2007-07-26), "M50.5 (Phonetic characters glyph correction) [U+027F, U+0285]", Unconfirmed minutes of WG 2 meeting 50, Frankfurt-am-Main, Germany; 2007-04-24/27
1.0.0	U+0250..0296	71		L2/10-268		Priest, Lorna (2010-07-29), Annotation additions resulting from encoding LATIN CAPITAL LETTER H WITH HOOK
1.0.0	U+0250..0296	71		L2/22-071		Jacquerye, Denis Moyogo (2022-02-08), Proposal to revise the glyphs of LATIN SMALL LETTER CLOSED OPEN E and LATIN SMALL LETTER CLOSED REVERSED OPEN E [U+025E, 029A]
1.0.0	U+0250..0296	71		L2/22-068		Anderson, Deborah; Whistler, Ken; Pournader, Roozbeh; Constable, Peter (2022-04-15), "1c Latin Small Letter Closed Open E etc.", Recommendations to UTC #171 April 2022 on Script Proposals
1.0.0	U+0250..0296	71		L2/22-061		Constable, Peter (2022-07-27), "Consensus 171-C16", Approved Minutes of UTC Meeting 171, "Accept the glyph changes for U+025E LATIN SMALL LETTER CLOSED REVERSED OPEN E and U+029A LATIN SMALL LETTER CLOSED OPEN E for correction in a future version of the standard."
1.0.0	U+0297..02A8	18	UTC/1991-047			Becker, Joe, Extended Latin, Standard Phonetic, Modifier Letters, General Diacritical Marks, Greek, Cyrillic
1.0.0	U+0297..02A8	18	UTC/1991-048B			Whistler, Ken (1991-03-27), "IPA additions", Draft Minutes from the UTC meeting #46 day 2, 3/27 at Apple
3.0	U+02A9..02AD	5		L2/98-209	N1742	Everson, Michael (1998-05-25), Additional IPA characters for the UCS
3.0	U+02A9..02AD	5		L2/98-293	N1885	"2.2", Comments on proposals to add various characters to ISO/IEC 10646, 1998-08-25
3.0	U+02A9..02AD	5		L2/98-299	N1845	Everson, Michael (1998-09-08), Additional IPA "disturbed speech" characters for the UCS
3.0	U+02A9..02AD	5		L2/98-301	N1847	Everson, Michael (1998-09-12), Responses to NCITS/L2 and Unicode Consortium comments on numerous proposals
3.0	U+02A9..02AD	5		L2/98-372	N1884R2 (pdf, doc)	Whistler, Ken; et al. (1998-09-22), Additional Characters for the UCS
3.0	U+02A9..02AD	5		L2/98-329	N1920	Combined PDAM registration and consideration ballot on WD for ISO/IEC 10646-1/Amd. 30, AMENDMENT 30: Additional Latin and other characters, 1998-10-28
3.0	U+02A9..02AD	5		L2/99-010	N1903 (pdf, html, doc)	Umamaheswaran, V. S. (1998-12-30), "8.2.10", Minutes of WG 2 meeting 35, London, U.K.; 1998-09-21--25
4.0	U+02AE..02AF	2		L2/01-272	N2366	Cook, Richard; Everson, Michael (2001-07-02), Proposal to add five phonetic characters to the UCS
4.0	U+02AE..02AF	2		L2/01-295R		Moore, Lisa (2001-11-06), Minutes from the UTC/L2 meeting #88
4.0	U+02AE..02AF	2		L2/01-347	N2366R	Cook, Richard; Everson, Michael (2001-09-20), Proposal to add six phonetic characters to the UCS
4.0	U+02AE..02AF	2		L2/02-154	N2403	Umamaheswaran, V. S. (2002-04-22), Draft minutes of WG 2 meeting 41, Hotel Phoenix, Singapore, 2001-10-15/19

== See also ==
- Phonetic symbols in Unicode, a list of all phonetic characters encoded in Unicode
- Latin script in Unicode, a list of all Latin characters encoded in Unicode
