= Hook (diacritic) =

Diacritical mark

◌̡ ◌̢ ◌˞o

Hook

In Unicode
- U+0321 ̡ COMBINING PALATALIZED HOOK BELOW; U+0322 ̢ COMBINING RETROFLEX HOOK BELOW; U+02DE ˞ MODIFIER LETTER RHOTIC HOOK

In typesetting, the hook or tail is a diacritic mark attached to letters in many alphabets. In shape it looks like a hook and it can be attached below as a descender, on top as an ascender and sometimes to the side. The orientation of the hook can change its meaning: when it is below and curls to the left it can be interpreted as a palatal hook, and when it curls to the right is called hook tail or tail and can be interpreted as a retroflex hook. It should not be mistaken with the hook above, a diacritical mark used in Vietnamese, or the rhotic hook, used in the International Phonetic Alphabet.

Different types of hook diacritics

== Letters with hook ==
It could be argued that the hook was used to derive the letter ⟨J⟩ from the letter ⟨I⟩, or the letter Eng ⟨ŋ⟩ from the letter ⟨N⟩. However, these letters are usually not identified as being formed with the hook.

Most letters with hook are used in the International Phonetic Alphabet, and many languages use them (along with capitals) representing the same sounds.

The hook often attaches to the top part of the letter, curling to the left or to the right, finishing the ascender if present. It may then be referred to as a crook, in some languages like French more commonly than in English that is less successful in mitigating the semantic overload of the hook term.

If the hook attaches to the bottom part of the letter, it is often called a palatal hook if it curls to the left, or a retroflex hook if it curls to the right.

In some fonts, a retroflex hook on a vowel letter may be attached to the bottom serif. However, in IPA publications, as here, the hook is continuous with the right stroke without a serif in letters such as ⟨ᶏ⟩, ⟨ᶐ⟩, ⟨ᶖ⟩, ⟨𝼚⟩ and ⟨ᶙ⟩.

The retroflex hook occurs on alveolar and post-alveolar IPA letters; it also occurs on vowel letters, which currently indicates the effect of a retroflex consonant on the vowel, but formally was an option for writing rhotic vowels.

Note that the 'fishhook r', ɾ, is shaped like a fishhook; the same is true for reversed ɿ. They do not have hook diacritics despite their misleading Unicode names "(Reversed) R with fishhook".

=== Table ===
Latin alphabet
Letters			Unicode name fragment	Hook position
	ᶏ		A with retroflex hook	bottom
	ᶐ		Alpha with retroflex hook	bottom
𝽨	𝽩		Phonotypic A with swash	bottom
Ɓ	ɓ	𐞅	B with hook	top
Ꞗ	ꞗ		B with flourish	left
	ᶀ		B with palatal hook	bottom
	𝼻		Beta with palatal hook	bottom
Ƈ	ƈ	𝿺	C with hook	top
Ꞔ	ꞔ		C with palatal hook	bottom
	𝼝		C with retroflex hook	bottom
	ɕ	ᶝ	C with curl	bottom
	𝼏		Stretched C with curl	bottom
Ɗ	ɗ	𐞌	D with hook	top
Ɖ	ɖ	𐞋	African D, D with tail	bottom
D with hook and tail	ᶑ	𐞍	D with hook and tail	top and bottom
	ᶁ	𝿵	D with palatal hook	bottom
	𝼭		D with hook and palatal hook	top and bottom
	𝼥		D with mid-height left hook	left
	ȡ	𝿯	D with curl	bottom
	𝼮		Dz digraph with palatal hook	bottom
	ʥ	𐞉	Dz digraph with curl	bottom
	𝼒		Dezh digraph with palatal hook	right
	𝼙	𝿡	Dezh digraph with retroflex hook	bottom
	𝼫	𝿠	Dezh digraph with curl	bottom
	𝼡		D-lezh digraph with retroflex hook	bottom
	𝼯		Eth with palatal hook	bottom
	ꬴ		E with flourish	left
	ᶒ		E with retroflex hook	bottom
	ⱸ		E with notch	bottom
	ɚ		Schwa with hook	right
	ᶕ		Schwa with retroflex hook	right
	ᶓ		Open E with retroflex hook	bottom
	ɝ		Reversed open E with hook	right
	ᶔ		Reversed open E with retroflex hook	bottom
Ƒ	ƒ		F with hook	bottom
	ᶂ		F with palatal hook	bottom
Ɠ	ɠ	𐞓	G with hook	top
	ʛ	𐞔	Small capital G with hook	top
	ᶃ		G with palatal hook	right
	𝼰		Small capital G with palatal hook	bottom
	𝽅		G with stroke and palatal hook	right
	ꬶ		Script G with crossed-tail	bottom
	𝼱		Gamma with palatal hook	right
Ɦ	ɦ	ʱ	H with hook	top
	𝽇		Barred H with hook	top
	ꞕ	𝿶	H with palatal hook	bottom right
	𝼲		H with stroke and palatal hook	bottom right
Ꜧ	ꜧ	ꭜ	Heng	bottom
	ɧ	𐞗	Heng with hook	top
	ʮ	𝿭	Turned H with fishhook	top
	ʯ	𝿮	Turned H with fishhook and tail	top and bottom
	ᶖ		I with retroflex hook	bottom
	𝼚		I with stroke and retroflex hook	bottom
	𝽰		I with pigtail at bottom	bottom
	𝽯		Phonotypic diphthong ai	bottom
Ʝ	ʝ	ᶨ	J with crossed-tail	bottom
	ʄ	𐞘	Dotless J with stroke and hook	top
Ƙ	ƙ	𝿻	K with hook	top
	ᶄ		K with palatal hook	bottom
	ᶅ	ᶪ	L with palatal hook	bottom
	𝼑		L with fishhook	right
	𝼦		L with mid-height left hook	left
	ɭ	ᶩ	L with retroflex hook	bottom
	ꞎ	𐞝	L with retroflex hook and belt	bottom
	𝼓		L with belt and palatal hook	bottom
	ȴ	𝿰	L with curl	bottom
	𝽧		Lezh with curl	bottom
	𝼅	𐞟	Lezh with retroflex hook	bottom
Ɱ	ɱ	ᶬ	M with hook	bottom
	𝽌		Barred M with hook	bottom
	ᶆ		M with palatal hook	bottom
	ꬺ		M with crossed-tail	bottom
Ɲ	ɲ	ᶮ	N with left hook	bottom left
	ᶇ	𝿷	N with palatal hook	bottom right
	𝼧		N with left hook	left
	ɳ	ᶯ	N with retroflex hook	bottom right
	ꬻ		N with crossed-tail	bottom
	ȵ	𝿱	N with curl	bottom
Ŋ	ŋ	ᵑ	Eng	bottom
	𝽏		Barred eng	bottom
	ꬼ		Eng with crossed-tail	bottom
	𝼔		Eng with palatal hook	right
	𝼛		O with retroflex hook	bottom
𝽲	𝽳		O with curl	top
	ᶗ		Open O with retroflex hook	bottom
Ƥ	ƥ	𝿼	P with hook	top
	ᶈ		P with palatal hook	right
Ꝓ	ꝓ		P with flourish	left middle
Ꝕ	ꝕ		P with squirrel tail	left top
	𝼳		Phi with palatal hook	right
	ʠ	𝿽	Q with hook	top
	𝼴		Q with palatal hook	right
Ɋ	ɋ		Small Q with hook tail	bottom
Ɽ	ɽ	𐞨	R with tail	bottom left
	ᶉ		R with palatal hook	bottom
	𝼷		R with tail and palatal hook	bottom
	𝼵		Small capital R with palatal hook	bottom
	𝼶		Small capital inverted R with palatal hook	bottom
	𝼖		R with fishhook and palatal hook	bottom
	𝼨		R with mid-height left hook	left
	ɻ	ʵ	Turned R with hook	bottom
	𝼈		Turned R with long leg and retroflex hook	bottom
	𝼕		Turned R with palatal hook	bottom
	ⱹ		Turned R with tail	top
	𝽗	𝿍	Turned r with mid-height left hook	left
	ꭉ		R with crossed-tail	bottom
	ꭊ		Double R with crossed-tail	bottom
	ᶊ	𝿸	S with palatal hook	bottom right
	𝼩		S with mid-height left hook	left
Ʂ	ʂ	ᶳ	S with hook	bottom left
	𝼞	𐞺	S with curl	bottom
Ȿ	ȿ		S with swash tail	bottom right
	ᶋ		Esh with palatal hook	right
	ᶘ	𝿣	Esh with retroflex hook	bottom
	ʆ	𝿢	Esh with curl	bottom
	𝼌		Esh with double bar and curl	bottom
Ƭ	ƭ	𝿾	T with hook	top
	ƫ	ᶵ	T with palatal hook	bottom
	𝼪		T with mid-height left hook	left
Ʈ	ʈ	𐞯	T with retroflex hook	bottom
	𝼉	𝿿	T with hook and retroflex hook	top and bottom
	ȶ	𝿲	T with curl	bottom
	𝼍		Turned T with curl	bottom
	ʨ	𐞫	Tc digraph with curl	bottom
	𝽣		Stretched t-h digraph	bottom
	𝼣		Tl digraph with retroflex hook and belt	bottom
	𝼗		Tesh digraph with palatal hook	right
	𝼜	𝿥	Tesh digraph with retroflex hook	bottom
	𝼬	𝿤	Tesh digraph with curl	right
	𝼼		Theta with palatal hook	bottom
	ꭒ	ꭟ	U with left hook	top left
	ᶙ		U with retroflex hook	bottom
𝽺	𝽻		U with hook tail	bottom
	ᶌ		V with palatal hook	bottom
	ⱱ	𐞰	V with right hook	top right
Ʋ	ʋ	ᶹ	V with hook	top right
	𝼹		V with hook and palatal hook	bottom
	ⱴ		V with curl	top left
Ⱳ	ⱳ		W with hook	top right
	ᶍ		X with palatal hook	bottom right
	𝼽		Chi with palatal hook	right
Ƴ	ƴ		Y with hook	top right
Ȥ	ȥ		Z with hook	bottom
Ᶎ	ᶎ	𝿹	Z with palatal hook	bottom
	ʐ	ᶼ	Z with retroflex hook	bottom
			n/a	top right or top left
	ʑ	ᶽ	Z with curl	bottom
Ɀ	ɀ		Z with swash tail	bottom
	𝼘		Ezh with palatal hook	right
	ᶚ	𝿧	Ezh with retroflex hook	bottom
	ʓ	𝿦	Ezh with curl	bottom
	ƺ		Ezh with tail	bottom
	𝼊	𐞹	Retroflex click with retroflex hook	bottom
	𝼺		Pharyngeal voiced fricative with palatal hook	bottom
	𝼎		Inverted glottal stop with curl	bottom
Ꜭ	ꜭ		Cuatrillo	bottom
Ꜯ	ꜯ		Cuatrillo with comma	bottom
Cyrillic alphabet
			n/a	bottom
Ӻ	ӻ		Ghe with stroke and hook	bottom
Ҕ	ҕ		Ghe with middle hook	right
Ҋ	ҋ		Short i with tail	bottom right
Ӄ	ӄ		Ka with hook	bottom right
Ԓ	ԓ		El with hook	bottom right
Ӆ	ӆ		El with tail	bottom right
Ӎ	ӎ		Em with tail	bottom right
Ӈ	ӈ		En with hook	bottom right
Ԩ	ԩ		En with left hook	bottom left
Ӊ	ӊ		En with tail	bottom right
Ꚋ	ꚋ		Te with middle hook	right
Ӽ	ӽ		Ha with hook	bottom right

=== Overview ===
- Hook ◌̡ ◌̢
  Latin: ᶏ
- ᶐ
- 𝽩
- 𝽨 𝽩
- Ɓ ɓ 𐞅
- Ꞗ ꞗ
- ᶀ
- 𝼻
- Ƈ ƈ 𝿺
- Ꞔ ꞔ
- 𝼝
- ɕ ᶝ
- 𝼏
- Ɗ ɗ 𐞌
- Ɖ ɖ 𐞋
- ᶑ 𐞍
- ᶁ 𝿵
- 𝼭
- 𝼥
- ȡ 𝿯
- 𝼮
- ʥ 𐞉
- 𝼒
- 𝼙 𝿡
- 𝼫 𝿠
- 𝼡
- ꬴ
- ᶒ
- ⱸ
- ɚ
- ᶕ
- ᶓ
- ɝ
- ᶔ
- Ƒ ƒ
- ᶂ
- Ɠ ɠ 𐞓
- ʛ 𐞔
- ᶃ
- 𝼰
- 𝽅
- ꬶ
- 𝼱
- Ɦ ɦ ʱ
- 𝽇
- ꞕ 𝿶
- 𝼲
- Ꜧ ꜧ ꭜ
- ɧ 𐞗
- ʮ 𝿭
- ʯ 𝿮
- ᶖ
- 𝼚
- 𝽰
- 𝽯
- Ʝ ʝ ᶨ
- ʄ 𐞘
- Ƙ ƙ 𝿻
- ᶄ
- ᶅ ᶪ
- 𝼑
- 𝼦
- ɭ ᶩ
- ꞎ 𐞝
- 𝼓
- ȴ 𝿰
- 𝽧
- 𝼅 𐞟
- Ɱ ɱ ᶬ
- 𝽌
- ᶆ
- ꬺ
- Ɲ ɲ ᶮ
- ᶇ 𝿷
- 𝼧
- ɳ ᶯ
- ꬻ
- ȵ 𝿱
- Ŋ ŋ ᵑ
- 𝽏
- ꬼ
- 𝼔
- 𝼛
- 𝽲 𝽳
- ᶗ
- Ƥ ƥ 𝿼
- ᶈ
- Ꝓ ꝓ
- Ꝕ ꝕ
- 𝼳
- ʠ 𝿽
- 𝼴
- Ɋ ɋ
- 𝼴
- Ɽ ɽ 𐞨
- ᶉ
- 𝼷
- 𝼵
- 𝼶
- 𝼖
- 𝼨
- ɻ ʵ
- 𝼈
- 𝼕
- ⱹ
- 𝽗 𝿍
- ꭉ
- ꭊ
- ᶊ 𝿸
- 𝼩
- Ʂ ʂ ᶳ
- 𝼞 𐞺
- Ȿ ȿ
- ᶋ
- ᶘ 𝿣
- ʆ 𝿢
- 𝼌
- Ƭ ƭ 𝿾
- ƫ ᶵ
- 𝼪
- Ʈ ʈ 𐞯
- 𝼉 𝿿
- ȶ 𝿲
- 𝼍
- ʨ 𐞫
- 𝽣
- 𝼣
- 𝼗
- 𝼜 𝿥
- 𝼬 𝿤
- 𝼼
- ꭒ ꭟ
- ᶙ
- 𝽺 𝽻
- ᶌ
- ⱱ 𐞰
- Ʋ ʋ ᶹ
- 𝼹
- ⱴ
- Ⱳ ⱳ
- ᶍ
- 𝼽
- Ƴ ƴ
- Ȥ ȥ
- Ᶎ ᶎ 𝿹
- ʐ ᶼ
- ʑ ᶽ
- Ɀ ɀ
- 𝼘
- ᶚ 𝿧
- ʓ 𝿦
- ƺ
- 𝼊 𐞹
- 𝼺
- 𝼎
- Ꜭ ꜭ
- Ꜯ ꜯ
  Cyrillic: Ӻ ӻ
- Ҕ ҕ
- Ҋ ҋ
- Ӄ ӄ
- Ԓ ԓ
- Ӆ ӆ
- Ӎ ӎ
- Ӈ ӈ
- Ԩ ԩ
- Ӊ ӊ
- Ꚋ ꚋ
- Ӽ ӽ
  In IPA: palatal hook

== Unicode ==
Unicode has the combining diacritics U+0321 ̡ COMBINING PALATALIZED HOOK BELOW and U+0322 ̢ COMBINING RETROFLEX HOOK BELOW but these are not recommended to be used with letters, and should be used to illustrate the hooks themselves. Instead Unicode recommends the use of precomposed characters that already include the hook.

The U+02DE ˞ MODIFIER LETTER RHOTIC HOOK is used to mark an r-colored vowel.

== See also ==
- Hook above
- Palatal hook
- Ogonek
