= F =

Sixth letter of the Latin alphabet

- F f

Usage
- Writing system: Latin script
- Type: Alphabetic
- Language of origin: Latin language
- Sound values: [f]; [ɸ~h]; [v]; [ʍ~xʷ]
- In Unicode: U+0046 U+0066
- Alphabetical position: 6

History
Development
T3
      - Ϝ ϝ ϛ
        - 𐌅
          - F f
- Time period: c. 700 BCE to present
- Descendants: Ḟ; ₣; ℉; ꟻ; ꬵ; 𝆑
- Sisters: U; V; W; Y; Ʊ; Ϝ; У; Ў; Ұ; Υ; ו, וּ, וֹ, ﻭ, ۋ, ܘ; ࠅ; 𐎆; 𐌖; Վ վ; Ո ո; Ւ ւ; և
- Transliterations: U; V; W; Y

Other
- Associated graphs: f(x)
- Associated numbers: 6, 15
- Writing direction: Left-to-right

F (minuscule: f) is the sixth letter of the Latin alphabet and many modern alphabets influenced by it, including the modern English alphabet and the alphabets of all other modern western European languages. Its name in English is ef (Note: Spelled eff when used as a verb.) (pronounced /ˈɛf/), and the plural is efs (Note: Example: The word coffee has two Fs in it), when the letter is used as a noun.

== History ==
Proto-Sinaitic	Phoenician waw	Western Greek Digamma	Etruscan V or W	Latin F
				Latin F

The origin of ⟨F⟩ is the Semitic letter waw, which represented the sound /w/. It probably originally depicted either a hook or a club. It may have been based on a comparable Egyptian hieroglyph such as that which represented the word for mace (transliterated as ḥ(dj)):

T3

The Phoenician form of the letter was adopted into Greek as a vowel, upsilon (which resembled its descendant ⟨Y⟩ but was also the ancestor of the Roman letters ⟨U⟩, ⟨V⟩, and ⟨W⟩); and, with another form, as a consonant, digamma, "Ϝ", which represented the pronunciation /w/, as in Phoenician. Latin ⟨F⟩, despite being pronounced differently, is ultimately descended from digamma and closely resembles it in form.

After sound changes eliminated /w/ from most dialects of Greek (Doric Greek retained it), digamma was used only as a numeral. However, the Greek alphabet also gave rise to other alphabets, and some of these retained letters descended from digamma. In the Etruscan alphabet, ⟨F⟩ probably represented /w/, as in Greek, and the Etruscans formed the digraph ⟨FH⟩ to represent /f/. (At the time these letters were borrowed, there was no Greek letter that represented /f/: the Greek letter phi ⟨Φ⟩ then represented an aspirated voiceless bilabial plosive /p^{h}/, although in Modern Greek it has come to represent /f/.) The Etruscan digraph may have been inspired by the rare use of ⟨ϜΗ⟩ in archaic Greek inscriptions for a dialectal sound like [ʍ], e.g. in the reflexive pronoun ϜΗΕ, which corresponds to Classical ἕ hé (see Ancient Greek phonology § Semivowels).

When the Romans adopted the alphabet, they used ⟨V⟩ (from Greek upsilon) not only for the vowel /u/, but also for the corresponding semivowel /w/, leaving ⟨F⟩ available for /f/. Initially, ⟨FH⟩ was also used for this sound in Latin, but the ⟨H⟩ was soon dropped. And so out of the various vav variants in the Mediterranean world, the letter F entered the Roman alphabet attached to a sound which the Greeks did not have. The Roman alphabet forms the basis of the alphabet used today for English and many other languages.

The lowercase ⟨f⟩ is not related to the visually similar long s, ⟨ſ⟩ (or medial s). The use of the long s largely died out by the beginning of the 19th century, mostly to prevent confusion with ⟨f⟩ when using a short mid-bar.

== Use in writing systems ==
Pronunciation of ⟨f⟩ by language
Orthography	Phonemes
Catalan	/f/
Standard Chinese (Pinyin)	/f/
English	/f/, /v/
French	/f/, silent
German	/f/
Portuguese	/f/
Spanish	/f/
Turkish	/f/

=== English ===
In the English writing system ⟨f⟩ is used to represent the sound /f/, the voiceless labiodental fricative. It is often doubled at the end of words. Exceptionally, it represents the voiced labiodental fricative /v/ in the common word "of" and its derivatives.

F is the eleventh least frequently used letter in the English language (after G, Y, P, B, V, K, J, X, Q, and Z), with a frequency of about 2.23% in words.

=== Other languages ===
In the writing systems of other languages, ⟨f⟩ commonly represents /f/, [ɸ] or /v/.

- In French orthography, ⟨f⟩ is used to represent /f/. It may also be silent at the end of words.
- In Spanish orthography, ⟨f⟩ is used to represent /f/.
- In Esperanto orthography, ⟨f⟩ is used to represent /f/.
- In the Hepburn romanization of Japanese, ⟨f⟩ is used to represent [ɸ]. This sound is usually considered to be an allophone of /h/, which is pronounced in different ways depending upon its context; Japanese /h/ is pronounced as [ɸ] before /u/.
- In Welsh orthography, ⟨f⟩ represents /v/ while ⟨ff⟩ represents /f/.
- In Slavic languages, ⟨f⟩ is used primarily in words of foreign (Hellenic, Romance, or Germanic) origin.
- In spoken Icelandic, ⟨f⟩ in the middle of a word is often voiced to [v] (e.g., Að sofa – to sleep).

=== Other systems ===
The International Phonetic Alphabet uses ⟨f⟩ to represent the voiceless labiodental fricative.

== Other uses ==
- In the hexadecimal (base 16) numbering system, F is a number that corresponds to the number 15 in decimal (base 10) counting.
- The italic letter f is conventionally used to denote an arbitrary function. Closely on f with hook (ƒ).
- A bold italic letter f is used in musical notation as a dynamic indicator for "loud or strong". It stands for the Italian word forte.
- In countries such as the United States, the letter "F" is defined as a failure in terms of academic evaluation. Other countries that use this system include Saudi Arabia, Venezuela, and the Netherlands.
- The letter F has become an Internet meme, where it is used to pay respects. This use is derived from the 2014 video game Call of Duty: Advanced Warfare, where in a quick-time event, protagonist Jack Mitchell must pay his respects to his friend Will Irons who fell in combat in a previous mission, represented by the player pressing F when playing the PC version. People on the Internet use the letter F sometimes in a genuine way to express respect, sadness, or condolences towards other Internet personalities, Internet memes, or other players on certain events.

== Related characters ==
=== Ancestors, descendants and siblings ===
- F with diacritics:
  - Ƒ ƒ
  - Ḟ ḟ
  - ᵮ
  - ᶂ
  - Ꞙ ꞙ : F with stroke is used in the Anthropos phonetic transcription system and older Ewe writing
- ꬵ : Lenis F is used in the Teuthonista phonetic transcription system
- ^{f}: Superscript "f", encoded as U+1DA0 ᶠ MODIFIER LETTER SMALL F in the Phonetic Extensions Supplement block of Unicode, is used in some forms of the International Phonetic Alphabet.
- ꜰ : Small capital F was used in the Icelandic First Grammatical Treatise to mark gemination
- ꟳ : Modifier letter capital F – Used to mark tone for the Chatino orthography in Oaxaca, Mexico; Used as a generic transcription for a falling tone; used in para-IPA notation.
- Ꝼ ꝼ : Insular F is used in Norse and Old English contexts
- ꟻ : Reversed F was used in ancient Roman texts to stand for filia (daughter) or femina (woman)
- Ⅎ ⅎ : Claudian letters
- 𐤅: Semitic letter Waw, from which the following symbols originally derive:
  - Ϝ ϝ : Greek letter Digamma, from which F derives:
    - 𐌅 : Old Italic V/F (originally used for V, in languages such as Etruscan and Oscan), which derives from Greek Digamma, and is the ancestor of modern Latin F
    - Y y : Latin letter Y, sharing its roots with F
    - V v : Latin letter V, also sharing its roots with F
      - U u : Latin letter U, which is descended from V
      - W w : Latin letter W, also descended from V

=== Ligatures and abbreviations ===
- ₣ : Proposed currency symbol for the French franc (never used), Latin capital letter F with stroke
- ℉ : degree Fahrenheit
- F : Fluorine, a chemical element uses the symbol F

== Other representations ==
=== Computing ===
These are the code points for the forms of the letter in various systems:

Character information
Preview	F		f		Ｆ		ｆ	
Unicode name	LATIN CAPITAL LETTER F		LATIN SMALL LETTER F		FULLWIDTH LATIN CAPITAL LETTER F		FULLWIDTH LATIN SMALL LETTER F	
Encodings	decimal	hex	dec	hex	dec	hex	dec	hex
Unicode	70	U+0046	102	U+0066	65318	U+FF26	65350	U+FF46
UTF-8	70	46	102	66	239 188 166	EF BC A6	239 189 134	EF BD 86
Numeric character reference	&#70;	&#x46;	&#102;	&#x66;	&#65318;	&#xFF26;	&#65350;	&#xFF46;
EBCDIC family	198	C6	134	86				
ASCII (Note: Also for encodings based on ASCII, including the DOS, Windows, ISO-8859 and Macintosh families of encodings.)	70	46	102	66				

=== Other ===
NATO phonetic	Morse code
Foxtrot	▄ ▄ ▄▄▄ ▄

Signal flag

Flag semaphore
American manual alphabet (ASL fingerspelling)
British manual alphabet (BSL fingerspelling)
Braille dots-124
Unified English Braille
