= Phonetic Extensions Supplement =

- Range: U+1D80..U+1DBF (64 code points)
- Plane: BMP
- Scripts: Greek (1 char.); Latin (63 char.)
- Major alphabets: IPA
- Assigned: 64 code points
- Unused: 0 reserved code points

Unicode Version History
- 4.1 (2005): 64 (+64)

Unicode documentation
- Code chart ∣ Web page

Phonetic Extensions Supplement is a Unicode block containing characters for specialized and old-style forms of the International Phonetic Alphabet.

== Block ==
Phonetic Extensions Supplement^{[1]} Official Unicode Consortium code chart (PDF)
	0	1	2	3	4	5	6	7	8	9	A	B	C	D	E	F
U+1D8x	ᶀ	ᶁ	ᶂ	ᶃ	ᶄ	ᶅ	ᶆ	ᶇ	ᶈ	ᶉ	ᶊ	ᶋ	ᶌ	ᶍ	ᶎ	ᶏ
U+1D9x	ᶐ	ᶑ	ᶒ	ᶓ	ᶔ	ᶕ	ᶖ	ᶗ	ᶘ	ᶙ	ᶚ	ᶛ	ᶜ	ᶝ	ᶞ	ᶟ
U+1DAx	ᶠ	ᶡ	ᶢ	ᶣ	ᶤ	ᶥ	ᶦ	ᶧ	ᶨ	ᶩ	ᶪ	ᶫ	ᶬ	ᶭ	ᶮ	ᶯ
U+1DBx	ᶰ	ᶱ	ᶲ	ᶳ	ᶴ	ᶵ	ᶶ	ᶷ	ᶸ	ᶹ	ᶺ	ᶻ	ᶼ	ᶽ	ᶾ	ᶿ
Notes 1.As of Unicode version 17.0

== History ==
The following Unicode-related documents record the purpose and process of defining specific characters in the Phonetic Extensions Supplement block:

Version	Final code points (Note: Proposed code points and characters names may differ from final code points and names)	Count	L2 ID	WG2 ID	Document
4.1	U+1D80..1DBF	64	L2/03-170		Constable, Peter (2003-05-30), Proposal to Encode Phonetic Symbols with Retroflex Hook in the UCS
4.1	U+1D80..1DBF	64	L2/03-169R		Constable, Peter (2003-06-06), Proposal to Encode Phonetic Symbols with Palatal Hook in the UCS
4.1	U+1D80..1DBF	64	L2/03-180		Constable, Peter (2003-06-07), Proposal to Encode Additional Phonetic Modifier Letters in the UCS
4.1	U+1D80..1DBF	64	L2/03-190R		Constable, Peter (2003-06-08), Proposal to Encode Additional Phonetic Symbols in the UCS
4.1	U+1D80..1DBF	64	L2/03-136		Moore, Lisa (2003-08-18), "Phonetic Symbols and Modifier Letters", UTC #95 Minutes
4.1	U+1D80..1DBF	64	L2/04-044		Constable, Peter (2004-02-01), Revised Proposal to Encode Additional Phonetic Modifier Letters in the UCS
4.1	U+1D80..1DBF	64	L2/04-045		Constable, Peter (2004-02-01), Revised Proposal to Encode Phonetic Symbols with Palatal Hook in the UCS
4.1	U+1D80..1DBF	64	L2/04-046		Constable, Peter (2004-02-01), Revised Proposal to Encode Phonetic Symbols with Retroflex Hook in the UCS
4.1	U+1D80..1DBF	64	L2/04-047		Constable, Peter (2004-02-01), Revised Proposal to Encode Additional Phonetic Symbols in the UCS
4.1	U+1D80..1DBF	64	L2/04-132	N2740	Constable, Peter (2004-04-19), Proposal to add additional phonetic characters to the UCS
4.1	U+1D80..1DBF	64	L2/04-144		Hallissy, Bob (2004-04-27), Soft-dotted characters in the pipeline
4.1	U+1D80..1DBF	64	L2/04-003R		Moore, Lisa (2004-05-17), "Phonetic Modifier Letters (B.14.10), Phonetic Symbols with Palatal Hook (B.14.11), Phonetic Symbols with Retroflex Hook (B.14.12), and Additional Phonetic Symbols (B.14.13)", UTC #98 Minutes
4.1	U+1D80..1DBF	64	L2/05-276		Davis, Mark; Whistler, Ken (2005-09-27), U+1DBF MODIFIER LETTER SMALL THETA
4.1	U+1D80..1DBF	64	L2/05-279		Moore, Lisa (2005-11-10), "Motion 105-M1", UTC #105 Minutes, "Change the script type of U+1DBF MODIFIER LETTER SMALL THETA to Greek."

== See also ==
- Greek alphabet in Unicode
- Latin script in Unicode
