= D =

Fourth letter of the Latin alphabet

- D d

Usage
- Writing system: Latin script
- Type: Alphabetic
- Language of origin: Latin language
- Sound values: [d]; [t]; [d͡ʒ]; [ɗ]; [z~j]; [ⁿd]; [ɖ]; [ɾ]; [ð~ð̞~ð̠˕ˠ]
- In Unicode: U+0044, U+0064
- Alphabetical position: 4

History
Development
K1K2O31
      - Δ δ
        - 𐌃
          - D d
- Time period: c. 700 BCE to present
- Descendants: Ď; ǅ; ǲ; Đ; Ð; Ƌ; Ꭰ; ₫; ∂; Ⓓ ⓓ ⒟; 🄓 🄳 🅓 🅳 🇩
- Sisters: Д; (ד د ܕ); Դ; դ; Ꭰ; Ꮫ; ደ

Other
- Associated graphs: d(x)
- Associated numbers: 4; 500
- Writing direction: Left-to-right

D (minuscule: d) is the fourth letter of the Latin alphabet, used in the modern English alphabet, the alphabets of other Western European languages and others worldwide. Its name in English is dee (pronounced /ˈdiː/), plural dees.

== History ==
Egyptian hieroglyph door, fish	Phoenician daleth	Western Greek Delta	Etruscan D	Latin D
O31K1K2				Latin D

The Semitic letter Dāleth may have developed from the logogram for a fish or a door. There are many different Egyptian hieroglyphs that might have inspired this. In Semitic, Ancient Greek and Latin, the letter represented /d/; in the Etruscan alphabet the letter was archaic but still retained. The equivalent Greek letter is delta, Δ.

The minuscule (lower-case) form of 'd' consists of a lower-story left bowl and a stem ascender. It most likely developed by gradual variations on the majuscule (capital) form 'D', and is now composed as a stem with a full lobe to the right. In handwriting, it was common to start the arc to the left of the vertical stroke, resulting in a serif at the top of the arc. This serif was extended while the rest of the letter was reduced, resulting in an angled stroke and loop. The angled stroke slowly developed into a vertical stroke.

== Use in writing systems ==
Pronunciation of ⟨d⟩ by language
Orthography	Phonemes
Catalan	/d/, /t/
Standard Chinese (Pinyin)	/t/
Dungan	/d̥/
English	/d/
French	/d/, silent
German	/d/, /t/
Icelandic	/t/
Portuguese	/d/
Spanish	/d/
Turkish	/d/
Vietnamese	/z/, /j/

=== English ===
In English, ⟨d⟩ generally represents the voiced alveolar plosive /d/.

The letter ⟨d⟩ is the tenth most frequently used in the English language.

=== Other languages ===
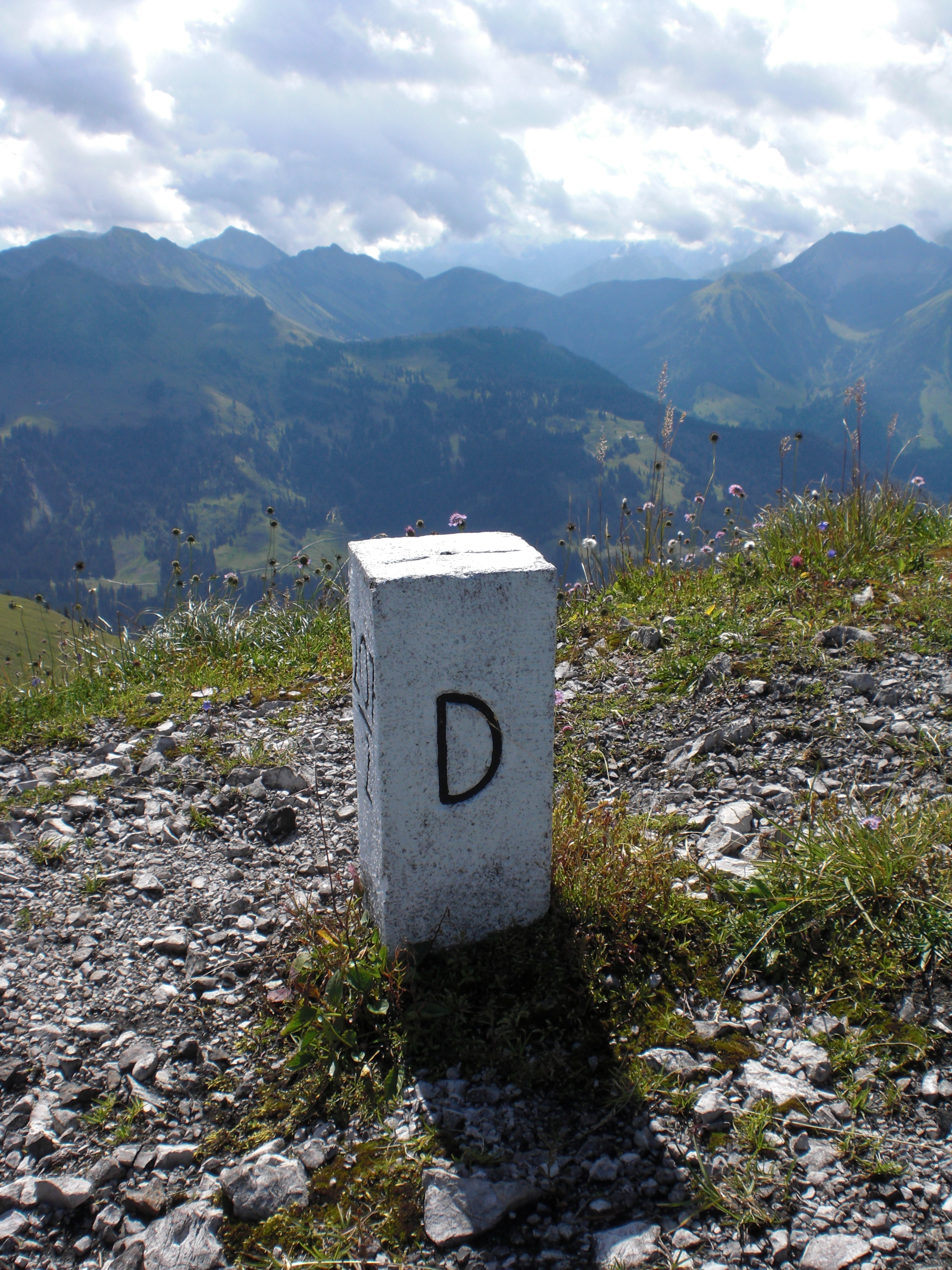
The letter D, standing for "Deutschland" (German for "Germany"), on a boundary stone at the border between Austria and Germany.

In most languages that use the Latin alphabet, ⟨d⟩ generally represents the voiced alveolar or voiced dental plosive /d/.

In the Vietnamese alphabet, it represents the sound /z/ in northern dialects or /j/ in southern dialects. In Fijian, it represents a prenasalized stop /ⁿd/.

In some languages where voiceless unaspirated stops contrast with voiceless aspirated stops, ⟨d⟩ represents an unaspirated /t/, while ⟨t⟩ represents an aspirated /tʰ/. Examples of such languages include Icelandic, Scottish Gaelic, Navajo and the pinyin transliteration of Mandarin.

=== Other systems ===
In the International Phonetic Alphabet, ⟨d⟩ represents the voiced alveolar plosive /d/.

== Other uses ==
- In the hexadecimal (base 16) numbering system, D is a number that corresponds to the number 13 in decimal (base 10) counting.
- The Roman numeral D represents the number 500.
- Unit prefix d, meaning one tenth.
- D is the grade below C but above E/F in the school grading system.
- D is the international vehicle registration code for Germany (also .de as its top-level domain).
- In Cantonese: Because the lack of Unicode CJK support in early computer systems, many Hong Kongers and Singaporeans used the capitalized D to represent 啲 (di1; 'a little').
- In the Gregory-Aland system for cataloging Biblical manuscripts, D can refer to documents in the Western text-type tradition, either Codex Bezae or Codex Claromontanus.
- d. is the standard abbreviation for the Penny (British pre-decimal coin) (from Latin: denarius)

== Related characters ==
=== Descendants and related characters in the Latin alphabet ===
- Ɖ ɖ : African D
- Ð ð : Latin letter Eth
- D with diacritics: Đ đ Ꟈ ꟈ Ɗ ɗ Ḋ ḋ Ḍ ḍ Ḑ ḑ Ḓ ḓ Ď ď Ḏ ḏ
- Phonetic symbols related to D:
  - Symbols related to D used in the IPA: ɖ ɗ
  - Symbols related to D used in the Uralic Phonetic Alphabet: ᴅ ᴰ ᵈ
  - Superscript IPA letters: 𐞋 𐞌 𐞍
  - Other phonetic symbols related to D: ȡ ᵭ ᶁ ᶑ
- Ƌ ƌ : D with topbar
- 𝼥: D with mid-height left hook – Used by the British and Foreign Bible Society in the early 20th century for romanization of the Malayalam language.
- Ꝺ ꝺ: Insular D is used in various phonetic contexts

=== Ancestors and siblings in other alphabets ===
- 𐤃: Semitic letter Dalet, from which the following symbols originally derive:
  - Δ δ: Greek letter Delta, from which the following symbols originally derive:
    - Ⲇ ⲇ: Coptic letter Delta
    - Д д: Cyrillic letter De
    - 𐌃: Old Italic D, the ancestor of modern Latin D
      - ᛞ: Runic letter dagaz, which is possibly a descendant of Old Italic D
      - ᚦ: Runic letter thurisaz, another possible descendant of Old Italic D
    - 𐌳: Gothic letter daaz, which derives from Greek Delta

=== Derived signs, symbols and abbreviations ===
- $\mathbb D$: May be used for the opening of a two-dimensional surface, in geometry; decimal fractions; split-complex numbers. (Unicode U+1D53B 𝔻 MATHEMATICAL DOUBLE-STRUCK CAPITAL D)
- ₫: Vietnamese đồng (Unicode U+20AB ₫ DONG SIGN)
- ⅆ: may be used as a derivative symbol (Unicode U+2146 ⅆ DOUBLE-STRUCK ITALIC SMALL D),
- ∂: the partial derivative symbol, $\partial$ (Unicode U+2202 ∂ PARTIAL DIFFERENTIAL)
- 𝾓: Historical mathematical symbol (Unicode U+1DF93 𝾓 LATIN SMALL LETTER D ROTUNDA WITH DESCENDING CROSSING LOOP)

== Other representations ==
=== Computing ===
The Latin letters ⟨D⟩ and ⟨d⟩ have Unicode encodings U+0044 D LATIN CAPITAL LETTER D and U+0064 d LATIN SMALL LETTER D. These are the same code points as those used in ASCII and ISO 8859. There are also precomposed character encodings for ⟨D⟩ and ⟨d⟩ with diacritics, for most of those listed above; the remainder are produced using combining diacritics.

Variant forms of the letter have unique code points for specialist use: the alphanumeric symbols set in mathematics and science, plosive sounds in linguistics and halfwidth and fullwidth forms for legacy CJK font compatibility.

=== Other ===
NATO phonetic	Morse code
Delta	▄▄▄ ▄ ▄

Signal flag

Flag semaphore
American manual alphabet (ASL fingerspelling)
British manual alphabet (BSL fingerspelling)
Braille dots-145
Unified English Braille

In British Sign Language (BSL), the letter 'd' is indicated by signing with the right hand held with the index and thumb extended and slightly curved, and the tip of the thumb and finger held against the extended index of the left hand.
