= M =

Thirteenth letter of the Latin alphabet

- M m

Usage
- Writing system: Latin script
- Type: Alphabetic and Logographic
- Language of origin: Latin language
- Sound values: [m]; [ɱ]; [n]; [n̼]; [◌̃]; [∅]
- In Unicode: U+004D, U+006D
- Alphabetical position: 13

History
Development
N35
        - Μ μ
            - 𐌌
              - M m
- Time period: c. 700 BCE to present
- Descendants: ₥; ™℠; ᴟ; ꬺ; ꟽ; ɯ; ɰ; ꟿ; ᛗ
- Sisters: М; Ӎ; מ; ם; م; ܡ; מּ; ﬦ; Ⰿ; ࠌ; 𐌼

Other
- Associated graphs: m(x)
- Associated numbers: 1000
- Writing direction: Left-to-right

M (minuscule: m) is the thirteenth letter of the Latin alphabet, used in the modern English alphabet, the alphabets of several Western European languages and others worldwide. Its name in English is em (pronounced /ˈɛm/), plural ems.

== History ==
Egyptian hieroglyph "n"	Phoenician Mem	Western Greek Mu	Etruscan M	Latin M
n				Latin M

The letter M is derived from the Phoenician Mem via the Greek Mu (Μ, μ). Semitic Mem is most likely derived from a "Proto-Sinaitic" (Bronze Age) adoption of the "water" ideogram in Egyptian writing. The Egyptian sign had the acrophonic value /n/, from the Egyptian word for "water", nt; the adoption as the Semitic letter for /m/ was presumably also on acrophonic grounds, from the Semitic word for "water", *mā(y)-.

== Use in writing systems ==
Pronunciation of ⟨m⟩ by language
Orthography	Phonemes
Catalan	/m/
Standard Chinese (Pinyin)	/m/
English	/m/, silent
French	/m/, /◌̃/
German	/m/
Portuguese	/m/, /◌̃/
Spanish	/m/, /n/
Turkish	/m/

=== English ===
In English, ⟨m⟩ represents the voiced bilabial nasal /m/.

The Oxford English Dictionary (first edition) says that ⟨m⟩ is sometimes a vowel, such as in words like spasm and in the suffix -ism. In modern terminology, this is described as a syllabic consonant (IPA: /m̩/).

The digraph, "mn," when used in the beginning of words, such as mnemonic, is pronounced as /n/. This digraph is the only instance where the letter ⟨m⟩ is silent.

M is the fourteenth most frequently used letter in the English language.

=== Other languages ===
The letter ⟨m⟩ represents the voiced bilabial nasal /m/ in the orthography of Latin as well as in those of many modern languages. In Spanish, final ⟨m⟩ is rare and mostly corresponds to /n/, with /m/ being a foreign pronunciation applied only by some speakers in loanwords.

In Washo, lower-case ⟨m⟩ represents a voiced bilabial nasal /m/, while upper-case ⟨M⟩ represents a voiceless bilabial nasal /m̥/.

=== Other systems ===
In the International Phonetic Alphabet, ⟨m⟩ represents the voiced bilabial nasal /m/.

== Other uses ==
Styled letter M in the coat of arms of Miehikkälä

- The Roman numeral M represents the number 1000, though it was not used in Roman times. There is, however, scant evidence that the letter was later introduced in the early centuries A.D. by the Romans.
- Unit prefix M (mega), meaning one million times, and m (milli) meaning one-thousandth.
- m is the standard abbreviation for metre (or meter) in the International System of Units (SI). However, m is sometimes also used as an abbreviation for mile.
- M is used as the unit abbreviation for molarity.
- With money amounts, m or M is ambiguous. In the finance industry, m or M means 1,000. In this context, five million dollars is written $5mm or $5MM. Outside of finance, some people use M like the metric system "mega-" to mean one million and write $5M.
- M often represents male or masculine, especially in conjunction with F for female or feminine.
- In typography, an em dash is a punctuation symbol whose width is similar to that of a capital letter M.
- M is used as a logo by many rapid transit systems, standing for "Metro" (or equivalents in other languages.)

== Related characters ==
=== Descendants and related characters in the Latin alphabet ===
- M with diacritics: Ḿ ḿ Ṁ ṁ Ṃ ṃ M̃ m̃ ᵯ
- IPA-specific symbols related to M: ɱ ɰ
- Ɱ : Capital M with hook
- Uralic Phonetic Alphabet-specific symbols related to M:
  - U+1D0D ᴍ LATIN LETTER SMALL CAPITAL M
  - U+1D1F ᴟ LATIN SMALL LETTER SIDEWAYS TURNED M
  - U+1D39 ᴹ MODIFIER LETTER CAPITAL M
  - U+1D50 ᵐ MODIFIER LETTER SMALL M
  - U+1D5A ᵚ MODIFIER LETTER SMALL TURNED M
- Some symbols related to M were used by the Uralic Phonetic Alphabet prior to its formal standardization in 1902:
  - U+2098 ₘ LATIN SUBSCRIPT SMALL LETTER M
  - U+A7FA ꟺ LATIN LETTER SMALL CAPITAL TURNED M
- The Teuthonista phonetic transcription system uses U+AB3A ꬺ LATIN SMALL LETTER M WITH CROSSED-TAIL
- Other variations used for phonetic transcription: ᶆ ᶬ ᶭ
- Ɯ ɯ : Turned M
- ꟽ : Inverted M was used in ancient Roman texts to stand for mulier (woman)
- ꟿ : Archaic M was used in ancient Roman texts to abbreviate the personal name 'Manius' (A regular capital M was used for the more common personal name 'Marcus')
- ℳ : currency symbol for Mark

=== Ancestors and siblings in other alphabets ===
- 𐤌 : Semitic letter Mem, from which the following symbols originally derive:
  - Μ μ : Greek letter Mu, from which M derives
    - Ⲙ ⲙ : Coptic letter Me, which derives from Greek Mu
    - М м : Cyrillic letter Em, also derived from Mu
    - 𐌌 : Old Italic M, which derives from Greek Mu, and is the ancestor of modern Latin M
      - ᛗ : Runic letter Mannaz, which derives from old Italic M
    - 𐌼 : Gothic letter manna, which derives from Greek Mu

=== Ligatures and abbreviations ===
- ₥ : Mill (currency)
- ™ : Trademark symbol
- ℠ : Service mark symbol

== Other representations ==
=== Computing ===
- U+004D M LATIN CAPITAL LETTER M
- U+006D m LATIN SMALL LETTER M
- U+FF2D Ｍ FULLWIDTH LATIN CAPITAL LETTER M
- U+FF4D ｍ FULLWIDTH LATIN SMALL LETTER M

=== Other ===
NATO phonetic	Morse code
Mike	▄▄▄ ▄▄▄

Signal flag

Flag semaphore
American manual alphabet (ASL fingerspelling)
British manual alphabet (BSL fingerspelling)
Braille dots-134
Unified English Braille
