= Esh (letter) =

Character and IPA symbol (Ʃ, ʃ)

- Ʃ ʃ
- (See below)

Usage
- Writing system: Latin script
- Type: Alphabetic and logographic
- Language of origin: Latin language, Serer language
- Sound values: [ʃ], [ʄ] /ˈɛʃ/
- In Unicode: U+01A9, U+0283

History
Development
Aa32M40
        - Σ σ ς
          - ς
            - 𐌔
              - S s
                - S ſ
                  - Ʃ ʃ
- Time period: 1847 to present
- Descendants: ꭍ; ʆ; ᶋ; ᶘ; ƪ; ᶴ
- Sisters: Š; ſ; Ꚃ; Ѕ; С; Ш; Щ; Ҫ; Ԍ; ש; ش; ܫ; س; ࠔ; 𐎘; 𐡔; ሠ; Ս ս; श; स; શ; સ; Disputed: ㅅ; ㅆ
- Variations: (See below)

Other
- Associated graphs: s(x), sh, š
- Writing direction: Left-to-Right

Esh (majuscule: Ʃ, minuscule: ʃ) is a character used in phonology to represent the voiceless postalveolar fricative (English ⟨sh⟩, as in "ship").

In Unicode, these letters are encoded as U+01A9 Ʃ LATIN CAPITAL LETTER ESH and U+0283 ʃ LATIN SMALL LETTER ESH

== Form, usage, and history ==
Its lowercase form ⟨ʃ⟩ is similar to an integral sign ⟨ ∫⟩ or a cursive long s ⟨ ſ ⟩, with a leftward hook at the bottom. In 1928, the Africa Alphabet borrowed the Greek letter sigma ⟨Ʃ⟩ for use as the uppercase form. The lowercase form was introduced by Isaac Pitman in his 1847 Phonotypic Alphabet to represent the voiceless postalveolar fricative (English sh). It is not common around African languages, but it is, in fact, used in some. For example, the Serer Latin alphabet uses its lowercase form for the [ʄ] consonant.

The International Phonetic Alphabet (IPA) uses U+0283 ʃ LATIN SMALL LETTER ESH to represent a voiceless palato-alveolar sibilant. Related obsolete IPA characters include U+01AA ƪ LATIN LETTER REVERSED ESH LOOP, U+0285 ʅ LATIN SMALL LETTER SQUAT REVERSED ESH, and U+0286 ʆ LATIN SMALL LETTER ESH WITH CURL.

U+AB4D ꭍ LATIN SMALL LETTER BASELINE ESH is used in the Teuthonista phonetic transcription system.

Variations of esh are used for phonetic transcriptions of other phonemes: ⟨ᶋ⟩, ⟨ᶘ⟩, ⟨^{ʃ}⟩.

U+1DF0B 𝼋 LATIN SMALL LETTER ESH WITH DOUBLE BAR and U+1DF0C 𝼌 LATIN SMALL LETTER ESH WITH DOUBLE BAR AND CURL are used as click letters.

== See also ==
- U+222B ∫ INTEGRAL
- U+017F ſ LATIN SMALL LETTER LONG S
- U+03A3 Σ GREEK CAPITAL LETTER SIGMA
- U+03C3 σ GREEK SMALL LETTER SIGMA
- U+0428 Ш CYRILLIC CAPITAL LETTER SHA
- U+0160 Š LATIN CAPITAL LETTER S WITH CARON
- U+015E Ş LATIN CAPITAL LETTER S WITH CEDILLA
- U+0D3D ഽ MALAYALAM SIGN AVAGRAHA (Praslesham)
- ⟨Sz⟩ (a Polish digraph)
- ⟨Sh⟩ (an English and Albanian digraph)
- Latin-script S-based digraphs (including the Italian ⟨sc⟩, English ⟨sh⟩, and Norwegian and Faroese ⟨sk⟩)
- Latin-script S-based trigraphs (including German ⟨sch⟩ and Italian ⟨sci⟩)
