= Latin Extended-E =

- Range: U+AB30..U+AB6F (64 code points)
- Plane: BMP
- Scripts: Latin (58 char.); Greek (1 char.); Common (3 char.)
- Major alphabets: German dialectology, Americanist, Sakha
- Assigned: 62 code points
- Unused: 2 reserved code points

Unicode Version History
- 7.0 (2014): 50 (+50)
- 8.0 (2015): 54 (+4)
- 12.0 (2019): 56 (+2)
- 13.0 (2020): 60 (+4)
- 18.0 (2026): 62 (+2)

Unicode documentation
- Code chart ∣ Web page

Latin Extended-E is a Unicode block containing Latin script characters used in German dialectology (Teuthonista), Anthropos alphabet, Sakha and Americanist usage.

== Block ==
Latin Extended-E^{[1]}^{[2]} Official Unicode Consortium code chart (PDF)
	0	1	2	3	4	5	6	7	8	9	A	B	C	D	E	F
U+AB3x	ꬰ	ꬱ	ꬲ	ꬳ	ꬴ	ꬵ	ꬶ	ꬷ	ꬸ	ꬹ	ꬺ	ꬻ	ꬼ	ꬽ	ꬾ	ꬿ
U+AB4x	ꭀ	ꭁ	ꭂ	ꭃ	ꭄ	ꭅ	ꭆ	ꭇ	ꭈ	ꭉ	ꭊ	ꭋ	ꭌ	ꭍ	ꭎ	ꭏ
U+AB5x	ꭐ	ꭑ	ꭒ	ꭓ	ꭔ	ꭕ	ꭖ	ꭗ	ꭘ	ꭙ	ꭚ	꭛	ꭜ	ꭝ	ꭞ	ꭟ
U+AB6x	ꭠ	ꭡ	ꭢ	ꭣ	ꭤ	ꭥ	ꭦ	ꭧ	ꭨ	ꭩ	꭪	꭫	꭬	꭭		
Notes 1.As of Unicode version 18.0 2.Grey areas indicate non-assigned code points

== History ==
The following Unicode-related documents record the purpose and process of defining specific characters in the Latin Extended-E block:

Version	Final code points (Note: Proposed code points and characters names may differ from final code points and names)	Count	L2 ID	WG2 ID	Document
7.0	U+AB30..AB5F	48	L2/08-428	N3555	Everson, Michael (2008-11-27), Exploratory proposal to encode Germanicist, Nordicist, and other phonetic characters in the UCS
7.0	U+AB30..AB5F	48	L2/09-256		Ellert, Mattias (2009-07-31), Comments on ISO/IEC JTC1/SC2/WG2 N3555 / L2/08-428
7.0	U+AB30..AB5F	48	L2/10-346	N3907	Everson, Michael; Wandl-Vogt, Eveline; Dicklberger, Alois (2010-09-23), Preliminary proposal to encode "Teuthonista" phonetic characters in the UCS
7.0	U+AB30..AB5F	48	L2/11-137	N4031	Everson, Michael; Wandl-Vogt, Eveline; Dicklberger, Alois (2011-05-09), Proposal to encode "Teuthonista" phonetic characters in the UCS
7.0	U+AB30..AB5F	48	L2/11-203	N4082	Everson, Michael; et al. (2011-05-27), Support for "Teuthonista" encoding proposal
7.0	U+AB30..AB5F	48	L2/11-202	N4081	Everson, Michael; Dicklberger, Alois; Pentzlin, Karl; Wandl-Vogt, Eveline (2011-06-02), Revised proposal to encode "Teuthonista" phonetic characters in the UCS
7.0	U+AB30..AB5F	48	L2/11-240	N4106	Everson, Michael; Pentzlin, Karl (2011-06-09), Report on the ad hoc re "Teuthonista" (SC2/WG2 N4081) held during the SC2/WG2 meeting at Helsinki
7.0	U+AB30..AB5F	48	L2/11-261R2		Moore, Lisa (2011-08-16), "Consensus 128-C38", UTC #128 / L2 #225 Minutes, "Approve 85 characters for German dialectology..."
7.0	U+AB30..AB5F	48		N4103	"11.16 Teuthonista phonetic characters", Unconfirmed minutes of WG 2 meeting 58, 2012-01-03
7.0	U+AB30..AB5F	48	L2/12-269	N4296	Request to change the names of three Teuthonista characters under ballot, 2012-07-26
7.0	U+AB30..AB5F	48	L2/12-343R2		Moore, Lisa (2012-12-04), "Consensus 133-C3, 133-C5", UTC #133 Minutes
7.0	U+AB30..AB5F	48		N4353 (pdf, doc)	"M60.01", Unconfirmed minutes of WG 2 meeting 60, 2013-05-23
7.0	U+AB30..AB5F	48		N4553 (pdf, doc)	Umamaheswaran, V. S. (2014-09-16), "M62.01b, M62.01g", Minutes of WG 2 meeting 62 Adobe, San Jose, CA, USA
7.0	U+AB30..AB5F	48	L2/22-101R		Jacquerye, Denis Moyogo (2022-06-14), Proposal to revise the glyph of LATIN SMALL LETTER BARRED ALPHA [affects U+AB30 annotation]
7.0	U+AB30..AB5F	48	L2/22-199		Jacquerye, Denis Moyogo (2022-06-27), On LATIN SMALL LETTER Y WITH SHORT RIGHT LEG [Affects U+AB5A]
7.0	U+AB30..AB5F	48	L2/22-128		Anderson, Deborah; Whistler, Ken; Pournader, Roozbeh; Constable, Peter (2022-07-20), "2c Latin Small Letter Barred Alpha", Recommendations to UTC #172 July 2022 on Script Proposals
7.0	U+AB30..AB5F	48	L2/22-121		Constable, Peter (2022-08-01), "Action Item 172-A106", Draft Minutes of UTC Meeting 172, "Add an annotation to U+AB30 LATIN SMALL LETTER BARRED ALPHA"
7.0	U+AB30..AB5F	48	L2/22-198		Jacquerye, Denis Moyogo (2022-08-19), On LATIN SMALL LETTER BLACKLETTER O WITH STROKE [Affects U+AB3E]
7.0	U+AB30..AB5F	48	L2/22-248		Anderson, Deborah; et al. (2022-10-31), "1b SMALL LETTER Y WITH SHORT RIGHT LEG [Affects U+AB5A] and 1c SMALL LETTER BLACKLETTER O WITH STROKE [Affects U+AB3E annotation]", Recommendations to UTC #173 October 2022 on Script Proposals
7.0	U+AB30..AB5F	48	L2/22-241		Constable, Peter (2022-11-09), "Consensus 173-C25 [Affects U+AB5A] and Action Item 173-A112 [Affects U+AB3E annotation]", Approved Minutes of UTC Meeting 173
7.0	U+AB64..AB65	2	L2/12-266	N4307	Schneidemesser, Luanne von; et al. (2012-07-31), Proposal for Two Phonetic Characters
7.0	U+AB64..AB65	2	L2/12-239		Moore, Lisa (2012-08-14), "C.13, D.13", UTC #132 Minutes
7.0	U+AB64..AB65	2	L2/13-132		Moore, Lisa (2013-07-29), "Consensus 136-C7", UTC #136 Minutes
7.0	U+AB64..AB65	2		N4403 (pdf, doc)	Umamaheswaran, V. S. (2014-01-28), "Resolution M61.01", Unconfirmed minutes of WG 2 meeting 61, Holiday Inn, Vilnius, Lithuania; 2013-06-10/14
8.0	U+AB60..AB63	4	L2/11-340		Yevlampiev, Ilya; Jumagueldinov, Nurlan; Pentzlin, Karl (2011-09-12), Proposal to encode four historic Latin letters for Sakha (Yakut)
8.0	U+AB60..AB63	4	L2/11-422		Salminen, Tapani; Anderson, Deborah (2011-10-31), Comments on L2/11-360 Latin letters used in the Former Soviet Union and L2/11- 340 Proposal to encode four historic Latin letters for Sakha (Yakut)
8.0	U+AB60..AB63	4	L2/12-044	N4213	Yevlampiev, Ilya; Jumagueldinov, Nurlan; Pentzlin, Karl (2012-04-26), Second revised proposal to encode four historic Latin letters for Sakha (Yakut)
8.0	U+AB60..AB63	4	L2/13-028		Anderson, Deborah; McGowan, Rick; Whistler, Ken; Pournader, Roozbeh (2013-01-28), "1", Recommendations to UTC on Script Proposals
8.0	U+AB60..AB63	4	L2/13-011		Moore, Lisa (2013-02-04), "C.6.1", UTC #134 Minutes
8.0	U+AB60..AB63	4	L2/13-132		Moore, Lisa (2013-07-29), "Consensus 136-C12", UTC #136 Minutes, "Approve the name change for U+AB60 LATIN SMALL LETTER SAKHA IOTIFIED A to U+AB60 LATIN SMALL LETTER SAKHA YAT."
8.0	U+AB60..AB63	4		N4403 (pdf, doc)	Umamaheswaran, V. S. (2014-01-28), "10.3.1 Four Historic Latin letters for Sakha (Yakut)", Unconfirmed minutes of WG 2 meeting 61, Holiday Inn, Vilnius, Lithuania; 2013-06-10/14
12.0	U+AB66..AB67	2	L2/17-299	N4842	Everson, Michael (2017-08-17), Proposal to add two Sinological Latin letters
12.0	U+AB66..AB67	2	L2/17-367	N4885	Anderson, Deborah; Whistler, Ken; Pournader, Roozbeh; Moore, Lisa (2017-09-18), "1. Latin", Comments on WG2 #66 (Sept. 2017) documents
12.0	U+AB66..AB67	2		N4953 (pdf, doc)	"M66.15d", Unconfirmed minutes of WG 2 meeting 66, 2018-03-23
12.0	U+AB66..AB67	2	L2/17-362		Moore, Lisa (2018-02-02), "Consensus 153-C7", UTC #153 Minutes
13.0	U+AB68..AB6B	4	L2/19-075R	N5036R	Everson, Michael (2019-05-05), Proposal to add six phonetic characters for Scots to the UCS
13.0	U+AB68..AB6B	4	L2/19-173		Anderson, Deborah; et al. (2019-04-29), "Phonetic characters for Scots", Recommendations to UTC #159 April-May 2019 on Script Proposals
13.0	U+AB68..AB6B	4	L2/19-122		Moore, Lisa (2019-05-08), "C.6", UTC #159 Minutes
13.0	U+AB68..AB6B	4		N5122	"M68.05", Unconfirmed minutes of WG 2 meeting 68, 2019-12-31
13.0	U+AB68..AB6B	4	L2/20-052		Pournader, Roozbeh (2020-01-15), Changes to Identifier_Type of some Unicode 13.0 characters
13.0	U+AB68..AB6B	4	L2/20-015R		Moore, Lisa (2020-05-14), "B.13.4 Changes to Identifier_Type of some Unicode 13.0 characters", Draft Minutes of UTC Meeting 162
18.0	U+AB6C..AB6D	2	L2/24-243		Jacquerye, Denis Moyogo (2024-08-10), Changing Latin script r glyphs and adding their capital characters
18.0	U+AB6C..AB6D	2	L2/24-228		Kučera, Jan; et al. (2024-11-01), "2.3 Latin Script R Glyphs and Capitals", Recommendations to UTC #181 (November 2024) on Script Proposals
18.0	U+AB6C..AB6D	2	L2/24-221		Constable, Peter (2024-11-12), "Consensus 181-C10", UTC #181 Minutes, "Provisionally assign 2 code points ..."
18.0	U+AB6C..AB6D	2	L2/25-226		"Consensus 185-C40", UTC #185 Minutes, 2025-10-29, "UTC accepts for encoding in Unicode 18.0 ..."

== See also ==
- Greek alphabet in Unicode
