= Tresillo =

Tresillo may refer to:

- Tresillo (rhythm), a rhythmical pattern
- Tresillo (letter), a letter used in Mayan languages.
- Tresillo (card game), a Spanish card game related to Ombre.
