= Te with descender =

Cyrillic letter used for /tʰ/ in Abkhaz

- Ҭ ҭ

Usage
- Writing system: Cyrillic
- Type: Alphabetic
- Language of origin: Abkhaz
- Sound values: /tʰ/

Te with descender (Ҭ ҭ; italics: Ҭ ҭ) is a letter of the Cyrillic script. Its form is derived from the Cyrillic letter Te (Т т Т т) by the addition of a descender to the leg of the letter.

Te with descender is used only in the alphabet of the Abkhaz language, where it represents the aspirated voiceless alveolar plosive /tʰ/, like the pronunciation of ⟨t⟩ in "tick".

== Computing codes ==
Character information
Preview	Ҭ		ҭ	
Unicode name	CYRILLIC CAPITAL LETTER; TE WITH DESCENDER		CYRILLIC SMALL LETTER; TE WITH DESCENDER	
Encodings	decimal	hex	dec	hex
Unicode	1196	U+04AC	1197	U+04AD
UTF-8	210 172	D2 AC	210 173	D2 AD
Numeric character reference	&#1196;	&#x4AC;	&#1197;	&#x4AD;

== See also ==
- Ŧ ŧ : Latin letter T with stroke
- Ţ ţ : Latin letter T with cedilla
- Ț ț : Latin letter T with comma
- Ꚋ ꚋ : Cyrillic letter Te with middle hook
- Cyrillic characters in Unicode
