= Cross-tailed G =

Letter of the Latin alphabet, a phonetic symbol

Cross-tailed g
- ꬶ

Usage
- Writing system: Latin script
- Type: Alphabet
- Language of origin: Teuthonista
- Sound values: [gʲ], [ɣ]

History
Development
(speculated origin)
  T14
          - Γ γ
            - 𐌂
              - C c
                - G g
                  - ꬶ
- Transliterations: Ꞔ ꞔ

Other
- Writing direction: Left-to-Right

ꬶ (lowercase only) is a letter of the Latin alphabet.

ꬶ was used in Teuthonista for the purposes of German dialectology, prior to the development of the International Phonetic Alphabet.

== Usage ==
In 1893, Otto Bremer used a cross-tailed g to represent a palatalizated voiced velar plosive [gʲ] in his phonetic transcription, but he replaced it with g with inverted breve ⟨g̑⟩. It has also been used in other transcriptions, like Arwid Johannson's Phonetics of the New High German language or Edmund Crosby Quiggin's Donegal Irish dialect transcription, in which it represents the voiced velar fricative [ɣ].

== Gallery ==
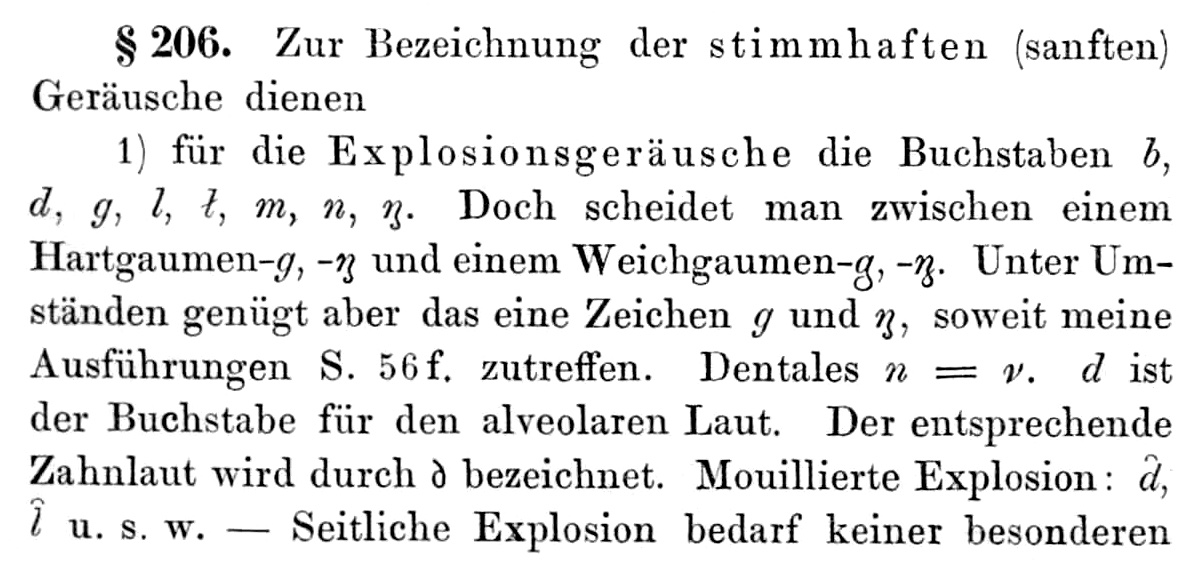

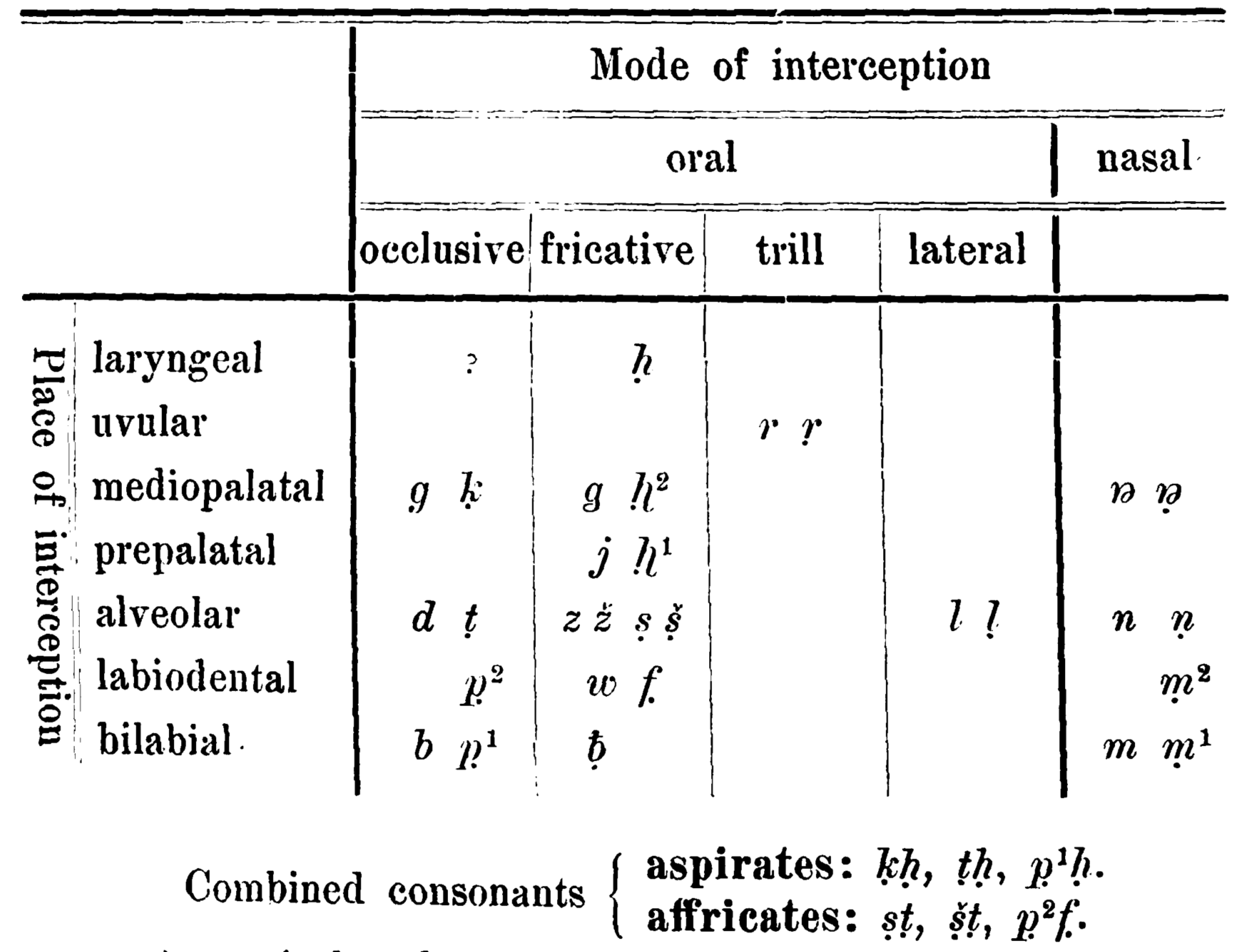

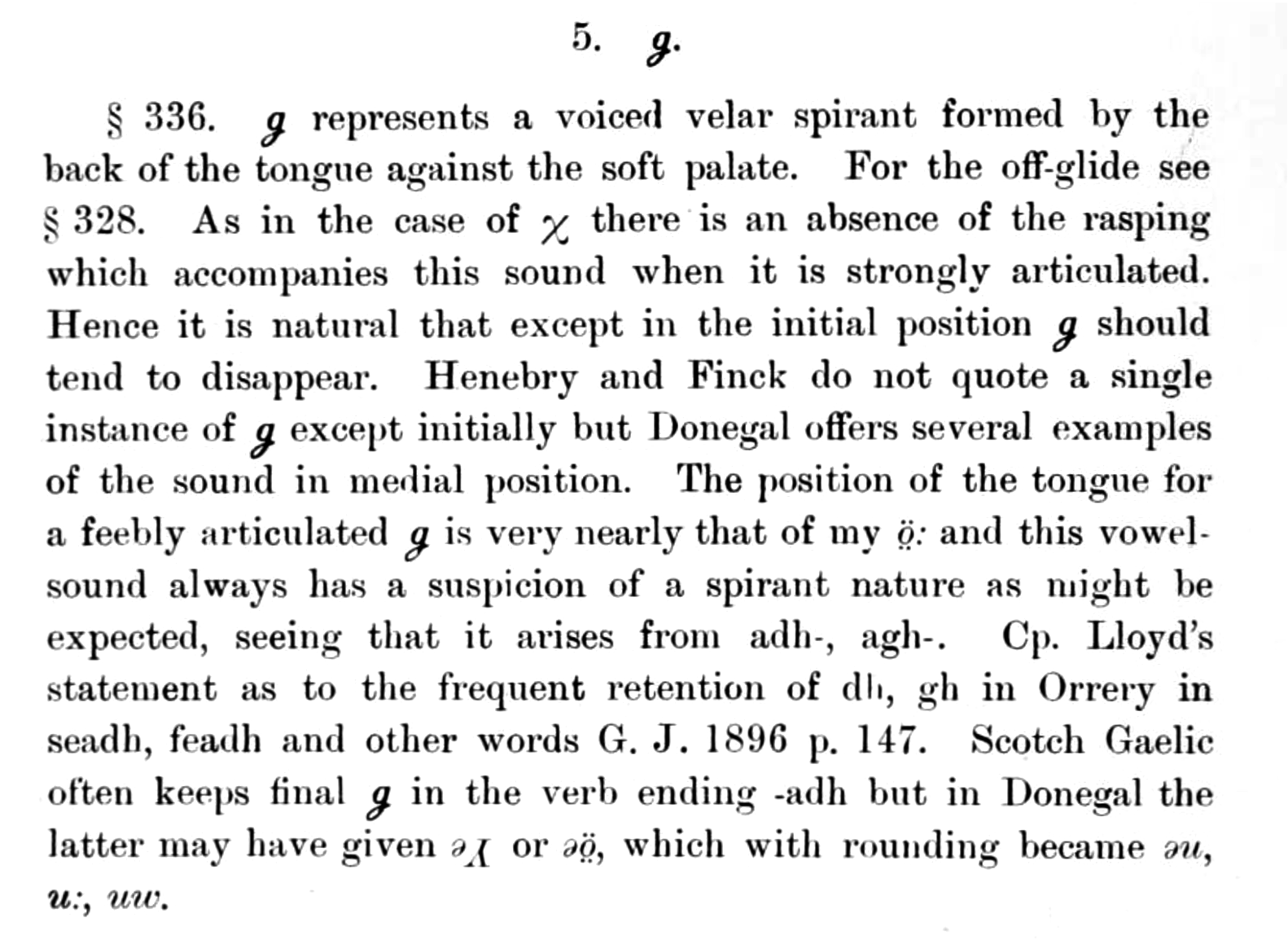

== Encoding ==
Character information
Preview	ꬶ	
Unicode name	LATIN SMALL LETTER SCRIPT G WITH CROSSED-TAIL	
Encodings	decimal	hex
Unicode	43830	U+AB36
UTF-8	234 172 182	EA AC B6
Numeric character reference	&#43830;	&#xAB36;
