= D with hook =

Majuscule and minuscule ɗ

Ɗ (minuscule: ɗ), known as D with hook, is a letter of the Latin alphabet. The lower case ⟨ɗ⟩ represents a voiced alveolar implosive in the International Phonetic Alphabet. It is used with the same value in the orthographies of various languages, notably some African languages, such as Fula and Hausa, also in Sindhi and used in Shona from 1931 to 1955.

The upper case ⟨Ɗ⟩ is formed from D with the addition of a hook. In Shona, from 1931 to 1955, the upper case form was a larger form of the lower case letter.

In Unicode, the upper case is in the Latin Extended B range (U+018A), and the lower case is in the IPA range (U+0257).

== Usage ==
The letter is used in the following alphabets:

- Africa Alphabet
- African reference alphabet
- Pan-Nigerian alphabet
- Alphabets for the following specific languages:
  - Fula (see also Fula alphabets)
  - Hausa

== See also ==
- African D
- D with hook and tail
