= D with hook and tail =

- ᶑ

Usage
- Writing system: Latin script
- Type: alphabetic
- Language of origin: International Phonetic Alphabet
- Sound values: [ᶑ]
- In Unicode: U+1d91

History
Development
K1K2O31
      - Δ δ
        - 𐌃
          - D d
            - Ɖ ɖ
              - ᶑ

ᶑ (d with hook and tail) is a letter of the Latin alphabet, used in phonetic transcription to represent a voiced retroflex implosive [ᶑ], though it is not explicitly part of the International Phonetic Alphabet. It is formed from d with the addition of a hook to mark it as implosive, and a tail to mark it as retroflex. It is thus a fusion of ⟨ɗ ⟩ and ⟨ɖ ⟩.

== Computer encoding ==
⟨ᶑ ⟩ was added to Unicode with version 4.1 in 2005.

Character information
Preview	ᶑ	
Unicode name	LATIN SMALL LETTER D WITH HOOK AND TAIL	
Encodings	decimal	hex
Unicode	7569	U+1D91
UTF-8	225 182 145	E1 B6 91
Numeric character reference	&#7569;	&#x1D91;

There is no Unicode encoding for a capital form (approx. ƊƉ). However, SIL fonts such as Gentium and Charis SIL have  U+F20D in their private-use areas as the capital form of ⟨ᶑ ⟩. Alternatively, combining characters can also represent the uppercase ᶑ (like Ɗ̢). There is no evidence of usage.
