= Te with middle hook =

Cyrillic letter

- Ꚋ ꚋ

Usage
- Writing system: Cyrillic
- Type: Alphabetic
- Language of origin: Abkhaz, Ossetian
- Sound values: /tʰ/

Te with middle hook (Ꚋ ꚋ; italics: Ꚋ ꚋ) is a letter of the Cyrillic script.

Te with middle hook is used in some old orthographies of the Abkhaz and Ossetian languages, as well as Ivan Yakovlev's Chuvash orthography.

In the modern Abkhaz language, Ҭ has replaced this letter. It represents the aspirated voiceless alveolar plosive /tʰ/.

== Computing codes ==
Character information
Preview	Ꚋ		ꚋ	
Unicode name	CYRILLIC CAPITAL LETTER TE WITH MIDDLE HOOK		CYRILLIC SMALL LETTER TE WITH MIDDLE HOOK	
Encodings	decimal	hex	dec	hex
Unicode	42634	U+A68A	42635	U+A68B
UTF-8	234 154 138	EA 9A 8A	234 154 139	EA 9A 8B
Numeric character reference	&#42634;	&#xA68A;	&#42635;	&#xA68B;

== See also ==
- Ҭ ҭ : Cyrillic letter Te with descender
- Cyrillic characters in Unicode
