= Cuatrillo =

Letter of many colonial Mayan alphabets in the Latin script

The cuatrillo
The cuatrillo with comma

Cuatrillo (capital: Ꜭ, small: ꜭ) (Spanish for "little four") is a letter of several colonial Mayan alphabets in the Latin script that is based on the digit 4. It was invented by a Franciscan friar, Alonso de la Parra, in the 16th century to represent the velar ejective consonant /kʼ/ found in Mayan languages, and is known as one of the Parra letters.

A derivative of the cuatrillo by adding a diacritic, ⟨Ꜯ ꜯ⟩, was used for the alveolar ejective affricate /tsʼ/ found in the same languages.

As an example of use, the letter appears when spelling the name of the Kʼicheʼ language in the Parra orthography: ꜭiche.

== Unicode ==
The Cuatrillo was added to Unicode in March, 2008 with the release of 5.1.

Character information
Preview	Ꜭ		ꜭ		Ꜯ		ꜯ	
Unicode name	LATIN CAPITAL LETTER CUATRILLO		LATIN SMALL LETTER CUATRILLO		LATIN CAPITAL LETTER CUATRILLO WITH COMMA		LATIN SMALL LETTER CUATRILLO WITH COMMA	
Encodings	decimal	hex	dec	hex	dec	hex	dec	hex
Unicode	42796	U+A72C	42797	U+A72D	42798	U+A72E	42799	U+A72F
UTF-8	234 156 172	EA 9C AC	234 156 173	EA 9C AD	234 156 174	EA 9C AE	234 156 175	EA 9C AF
Numeric character reference	&#42796;	&#xA72C;	&#42797;	&#xA72D;	&#42798;	&#xA72E;	&#42799;	&#xA72F;

== See also ==
- Tresillo
