= V with curl =

Letter of the Latin Alphabet

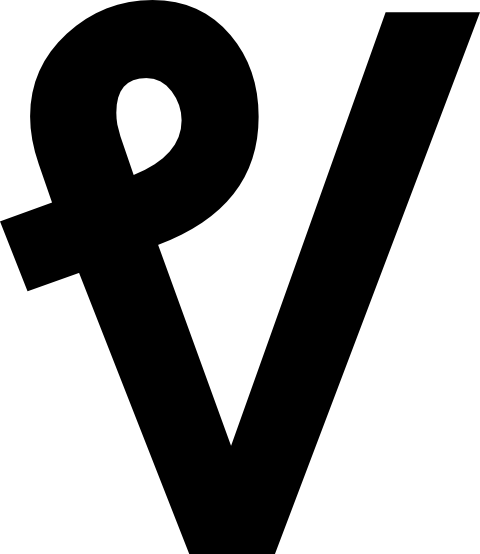
Ad hoc symbol for the labiodental flap

ⱴ (lowercase only) is a letter of the Latin alphabet, used in the phonetic transcription of African languages to represent a labiodental flap. Although not an approved symbol of the International Phonetic Alphabet, it had been widely used to represent this sound. In 2005, the symbol right-hook v ⟨ⱱ⟩ was added to the IPA to represent the sound.

== Computer encoding ==
Character information
| Preview | ⱴ | |
|---|---|---|
| Unicode name | LATIN SMALL LETTER V WITH CURL | |
| Encodings | decimal | hex |
| Unicode | 11380 | U+2C74 |
| UTF-8 | 226 177 180 | E2 B1 B4 |
| Numeric character reference | &#11380; | &#x2C74; |
