= ᶈ =

Unicode character

- ᶈ

Usage
- Writing system: Latin script
- Type: alphabetic
- Language of origin: International Phonetic Alphabet (before 1989); Tabasaran, Kurdish, Lak and Lezgian (1920s)
- Sound values: [pʼ], [pʲ]
- In Unicode: U+1D88

History
Development
D21
              - 𐌐
                - P p
                  - ᶈ

P with palatal hook (ᶈ) is a Latin letter formerly used in the International Phonetic Alphabet which became obsolete in 1989, following the Kiel Convention. It was also used in the Latinized scripts of the Tabasaran, Kurdish, Lak and Lezgian languages in the 1920s.

== IPA usage ==
ᶈ was used to represent a palatalized voiceless bilabial plosive prior to 1989, represented today as [pʲ].

== Latinized Soviet scripts ==
=== Background ===
Since at least 1700, some intellectuals in the Russian Empire had sought to Latinise the Russian language, written in Cyrillic script, in their desire for closer relations with the West.

In the early 20th century, the Bolsheviks had four goals: to break with Tsarism, to spread socialism to the whole world, to isolate the Muslim inhabitants of the Soviet Union from the Arabic–Islamic world and religion, and to eradicate illiteracy through simplification. They concluded the Latin alphabet was the right tool to do so and, after seizing power during the Russian Revolution of 1917, they made plans to realise these ideals.

Although progress was slow at first, in 1926, the Turkic-majority republics of the Soviet Union adopted the Latin script, giving a major boost to reformers in neighbouring Turkey. In 1928, when Turkish president Mustafa Kemal Atatürk adopted the new Turkish Latin alphabet to break with Arabic script, this in turn encouraged the Soviet leaders to proceed. By 1933, it was estimated that among some language groups that had shifted from an Arabic-based script to Latin, literacy rates rose from 2% to 60%.

=== Procedure ===
After the Russian Revolution, as the Soviets looked to build a state that better accommodated the diverse national groups that had made up the Russian Empire, support for literacy and national languages became a major political project. Soviet nationalities policy called for conducting education and government work in national languages, which spurred the need for linguistic reform. Among the Islamic and Turkic peoples of Central Asia, the most common literary script for their languages was based on Arabic or Persian script; however, these were considered a hindrance to literacy, particularly for Turkic languages because of its lack of scripted vowels.

In the 1920s, efforts were made to modify the Arabic (such as the Yaña imlâ alphabet developed for Tatar), but some groups adopted Latin-based alphabets instead. Because of past conflict with tsarist missionaries, a Latin-based script was viewed as "less odious" than a Cyrillic one. By the end of the decade, the move towards latinisation was in full swing. On 8 August 1929, the Central Executive Committee and the Council of People's Commissars of the USSR issued the decree "On the New Latinised Alphabet of the Peoples of the Arabic Written Language of the USSR", and thus the transition to the Latin alphabet was given an official status for all Turko-Tatar languages in the Soviet Union.

Efforts then began in earnest to expand beyond replacing Arabic script and Turkic languages and to develop Latin-based scripts for all national languages in the Soviet Union. In 1929, the People's Commissariat of the RSFSR formed a committee to develop the question of the latinisation of the Russian alphabet, the All-Union Committee for the New Alphabet (Russian: ВЦК НА, VTsK NA), led by Professor N. F. Yakovlev and with the participation of linguists, bibliographers, printers, and engineers. By 1932, Latin-based scripts were developed for almost all Turkic, Iranian, Mongolic, Tungusic, and Uralic languages, totalling 66 of the 72 written languages in the USSR. There also existed plans to latinise Chinese, Korean, and Russian, along with other Slavic languages.

=== Decline ===
By mid-January 1930, the VTsK NA had officially completed its work. However, on 25 January 1930, General Secretary Joseph Stalin ordered to halt the development of the question of the latinisation of the Cyrillic alphabet for Russian. Belarusian and Ukrainian were similarly placed off limits for latinisation. Stalin's order led to a gradual slowdown of the campaign. By 1933, attitudes towards latinisation had shifted dramatically and all the newly romanised languages were converted to Cyrillic. The only language without an attempt to latinise its script was Georgian.

In total, between 1923 and 1939, Latin alphabets were implemented for 50 out of 72 languages of the USSR that were written, and Latin alphabets were developed for a number of previously exclusively oral languages. In the Mari, Mordvinic and Udmurt languages, the use of the Cyrillic alphabet continued even during the period of maximum latinisation due in part to a growing body of literature written with the Cyrillic alphabet in those languages.

In 1936, a new Cyrillisation campaign began to move all the languages of the peoples of the USSR to Cyrillic, which was largely completed by 1940. German, Georgian, Armenian and Yiddish remained non-cyrillised from the languages common in the USSR, with the last three never being latinised either. Later, Polish, Finnish, Latvian, Estonian and Lithuanian languages also remained un-cyrillised.

=== Usage ===
ᶈ was introduced for the Tabasaran, Lak, Lezgin and Kurdish Latin alphabets to represent various bilabial phonemes in the different languages. In Kurdish, it represented an aspirated voiceless bilabial plosive ([pʰ] in IPA). In the other languages, it represented the bilabial ejective stop ([pʼ] in IPA). In certain fonts, it can appear as a tick (cf. er with tick ⟨Ҏ ҏ⟩) or comma attached to the bowl of the letter.

=== Gallery ===
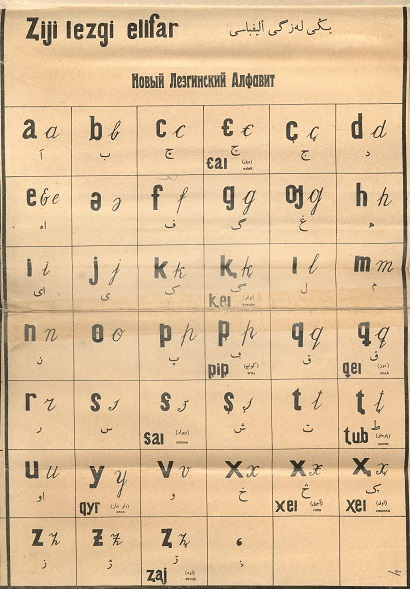
Lezgin Latin alphabet chart (1928)

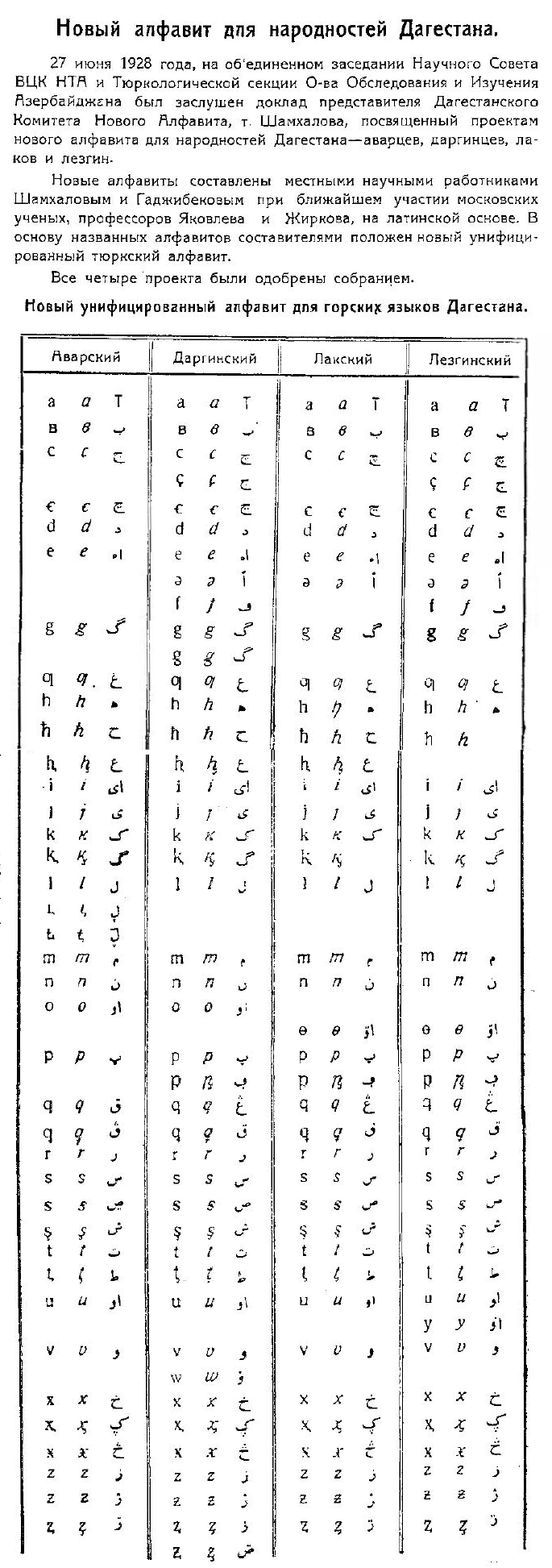
Chart displaying Latin alphabets of various North Caucasian languages; note ᶈ in the Lak and Lezgin alphabets.

== Computing codes ==
P with palatal hook can be represented with the following Unicode characters:

Character information
Preview	ᶈ	
Unicode name	LATIN SMALL LETTER P WITH PALATAL HOOK	
Encodings	decimal	hex
Unicode	7560	U+1D88
UTF-8	225 182 136	E1 B6 88
Numeric character reference	&#7560;	&#x1D88;

== See also ==
- P
- Hook (diacritic)
- Palatal hook

== Bibliography ==
- International Phonetic Association (1989a). "Report on the 1989 Kiel Convention". Journal of the International Phonetic Association. 19 (2): 67–80. doi:10.1017/S0025100300003868. JSTOR 44526032. Full access available to users of The Wikipedia Library.
