= Tresillo (letter) =

Letter of several colonial Mayan alphabets in the Latin script, based on the digit 3

The tresillo

Tresillo (capital: Ꜫ, small: ꜫ; Spanish for "little three") is a letter of several colonial Mayan alphabets in the Latin script that is based on the digit 3. It was invented by a Franciscan friar, Francisco de la Parra, in the 16th century to represent the uvular ejective consonant /qʼ/ found in Mayan languages, and is known as one of the Parra letters. In cursive form, the tresillo is often written similar to ⟨c ̑ ⟩.

As an example of use, the word for fire in the Kaqchikel language, qʼaqʼ, is written ꜫaꜫ in the Parra orthography.

Character information
Preview	Ꜫ		ꜫ	
Unicode name	LATIN CAPITAL LETTER TRESILLO		LATIN SMALL LETTER TRESILLO	
Encodings	decimal	hex	dec	hex
Unicode	42794	U+A72A	42795	U+A72B
UTF-8	234 156 170	EA 9C AA	234 156 171	EA 9C AB
Numeric character reference	&#42794;	&#xA72A;	&#42795;	&#xA72B;

Tresillo and similar characters shown in different fonts: Blue: Letter Ɛ. – Black: Tresillo. – Green: Turned digit 3. – Red: Outdated Euler constant symbol. (Green and red characters shown only for fonts in which they are present). Fonts: Unicode code tables font, Times New Roman, Arial, Tahoma, Noto Serif, Gentium, Charis SIL, Andika.

== See also ==
- Cuatrillo
