= African D =

Variant of the Latin letter D used in African alphabets

Ɖ
- Ɖ ɖ

Usage
- Writing system: Latin script
- Type: Alphabetic
- Language of origin: Latin language
- Sound values: [ɖ]
- In Unicode: U+0189, U+0256
- Alphabetical position: 9

History
Development
K1K2O31
      - Δ δ
        - 𐌃
          - D d
            - Ɖ ɖ
- Time period: 1978 to present

Other
- Writing direction: Left-to-right

African D (Ɖ, ɖ) is a Latin letter representing the voiced retroflex plosive [ɖ]. It is a part of the African reference alphabet. It is mainly used by African languages such as Ewe, Fon, Aja, and Bassa. The African D should not be confused with either the eth (Ð, ð) of Icelandic, Faroese and Old English or with the D with stroke (Đ, đ) of Vietnamese, Serbo-Croatian and Sami languages. However, the upper-case forms of these letters tend to look the same.

The lower-case variant (ɖ, known as retroflex D, D with tail, or D with retroflex hook) is used to represent the voiced retroflex plosive in the International Phonetic Alphabet (but in the transcription of the languages of India, the same sound may be represented by a d with dot below: ḍ).

== Computer encoding ==
Character information
Preview	Ɖ		ɖ	
Unicode name	LATIN CAPITAL LETTER AFRICAN D		LATIN SMALL LETTER D WITH TAIL	
Encodings	decimal	hex	dec	hex
Unicode	393	U+0189	598	U+0256
UTF-8	198 137	C6 89	201 150	C9 96
Numeric character reference	&#393;	&#x189;	&#598;	&#x256;

== See also ==
- D with hook
- D with hook and tail
- Eth
- D with stroke
