= Voiced retroflex plosive =

Consonantal sound represented by ⟨ɖ⟩ in IPA

ɖ
- IPA number: 106

Audio sample
- source · help

Encoding
- Entity (decimal): &#598;
- Unicode (hex): U+0256
- X-SAMPA: d`
- Braille: ⠲ (braille pattern dots-256) ⠙ (braille pattern dots-145)
Image

A voiced retroflex plosive or stop is a type of consonantal sound, used in some spoken languages. The symbol in the International Phonetic Alphabet that represents this sound is ⟨ ɖ ⟩. Like all the retroflex consonants, the IPA symbol is formed by adding a rightward-pointing hook extending from the bottom of a d, the letter that is used for the corresponding alveolar consonant. Many South Asian languages, such as Hindi and Urdu, have a two-way contrast between plain and murmured (breathy voice) [ ɖ ].

== Features ==
Sagittal section of a voiced retroflex plosive

Features of a voiced retroflex stop:

- Its manner of articulation is occlusive, which means it is produced by obstructing airflow in the vocal tract. Since the consonant is also oral, with no nasal outlet, it is a plosive.
- Its place of articulation is retroflex, which prototypically means it is articulated subapical (with the tip of the tongue curled up), but more generally, it means that it is postalveolar without being palatalized. That is, besides the prototypical subapical articulation, the tongue can be apical (pointed) or, in some fricatives, laminal (flat).
- Its phonation is voiced, which means the vocal cords vibrate during the articulation.
- It is an oral consonant, which means that air is not allowed to escape through the nose.
- It is a median consonant, which means it is produced by directing the airstream down the midline of the tongue, rather than to the sides.
- Its airstream mechanism is pulmonic, which means it is articulated by pushing air only with the intercostal muscles and abdominal muscles, as in most speech sounds.

== Occurrence ==
Language		Word	IPA	Meaning	Notes
Asturian	Astierna dialect	ḷḷingua	[ɖiŋɡwä]	'tongue'	Corresponds to /ʎ/ in other dialects. See Che Vaqueira
Balochi		ڈل/dèl	[ɖɪl]	'female donkey'	
Bengali		ডাকাত	[ɖakat̪]	'robber'	Apical postalveolar. See Bengali phonology
English	Indian dialects	dine	[ɖaɪn]	'to eat'	Corresponds to /d/ in other dialects. See English phonology
English	General American	herd	[hɚɖ]	'herd'	Allophone of /d/ before /ɹ/ or /ɚ/
Fon		ɖù	[ɖù]	'to celebrate'	
Gujarati		હાડ	[ɦaɖ]	'bone'	Subapical. See Gujarati phonology
Hindustani		डालना/ڈالنا	[ɖaːlnaː]	'to put'	Apical postalveolar. See Hindustani phonology
Javanese		ꦣꦲꦂ/dhahar/ڎاهار	[ɖahaɽ]	'to eat'	
Kannada		ಅಡಸು	[ɐɖɐsu]	'to join'	
Kashmiri		ڈَر	[ɖar]	'fear'	
Maba		kodrok/كٛڔٛك	[kɔɖɔk]	'false'	
Malayalam		പടം/padam	[pɐɖɐm]	'picture' or 'movie'	See Malayalam phonology
Marathi		हाड	[haːɖ]	'bone'	Subapical. See Marathi phonology
Nepali		डर	[ɖʌr]	'fear'	Apical postalveolar. See Nepali phonology
Nihali		[biɖum]		'one'	
Norwegian		varde	[ˈʋɑɖːə]	'beacon'	See Norwegian phonology
Odia		ଡଙ୍ଗା/ḍaṅgā	[ɖɔŋga]	'boat'	Apical postalveolar.
Pashto		ډﻙ	[ɖak]	'full'	
Punjabi		ਡੱਡੂ	[ɖəɖːu]	'frog'	
Sardinian		cherveddu	[keɾˈveɖːu]	'brain'	
Sicilian		coḍḍu	[kɔɖːu]	'neck'	
Sindhi		واڍو/vāḍho/वाढो	[ʋɑɖʱo]	'carpenter'	
Sinhala		බඩ	[baɖə]	'stomach'	
Somali		dhul	[ɖul]	'earth, land, ground'	See Somali phonology
Swedish		nord	[nuːɖ]	'north'	See Swedish phonology
Tamil		வண்டி	[ʋəɳɖi]	'cart'	Subapical; allophone of /ʈ/. See Tamil phonology
Telugu		కడ్డి	[kɐɖːi]	'rod'	Contrasts unaspirated and aspirated forms. Aspirated form articulated as breathy consonant.
Torwali		ڈىغو	[ɖiɣu]	'late afternoon'	Realised as [ɽ] between vowels.

== See also ==
- African D
- Index of phonetics articles

== Notes ==
Place →	Labial					Coronal										Dorsal					Laryngeal			
Manner ↓	Bilabial		Labiodental		Linguolabial		Dental		Alveolar		Postalveolar		Retroflex		(Alveolo-)palatal		Velar		Uvular		Pharyngeal/epiglottal		Glottal	
Nasal	m̥	m	ɱ̊	ɱ		n̼	n̪̊	n̪	n̥	n	n̠̊	n̠	ɳ̊	ɳ	ɲ̊	ɲ	ŋ̊	ŋ	ɴ̥	ɴ				
Plosive	p	b	p̪	b̪	t̼	d̼	t̪	d̪	t	d			ʈ	ɖ	c	ɟ	k	ɡ	q	ɢ	ʡ		ʔ	
Sibilant affricate							t̪s̪	d̪z̪	ts	dz	t̠ʃ	d̠ʒ	tʂ	dʐ	tɕ	dʑ								
Non-sibilant affricate	pɸ	bβ	p̪f	b̪v			t̪θ	d̪ð	tɹ̝̊	dɹ̝	t̠ɹ̠̊˔	d̠ɹ̠˔			cç	ɟʝ	kx	ɡɣ	qχ	ɢʁ	ʡʜ	ʡʢ	ʔh	
Sibilant fricative							s̪	z̪	s	z	ʃ	ʒ	ʂ	ʐ	ɕ	ʑ								
Non-sibilant fricative	ɸ	β	f	v	θ̼	ð̼	θ	ð	θ̠	ð̠	ɹ̠̊˔	ɹ̠˔	ɻ̊˔	ɻ˔	ç	ʝ	x	ɣ	χ	ʁ	ħ	ʕ	h	ɦ
Approximant		β̞		ʋ				ð̞		ɹ		ɹ̠		ɻ		j		ɰ						˷
Tap/flap		ⱱ̟		ⱱ					ɾ̥	ɾ			ɽ̊	ɽ						ɢ̆		ʡ̆		
Trill	ʙ̥	ʙ							r̥	r		r̠	ɽ̊r̥	ɽr					ʀ̥	ʀ	ʜ	ʢ		
Lateral affricate									tɬ	dɮ			tꞎ	d𝼅	c𝼆	ɟʎ̝	k𝼄	ɡʟ̝						
Lateral fricative							ɬ̪		ɬ	ɮ			ꞎ	𝼅	𝼆	ʎ̝	𝼄	ʟ̝						
Lateral approximant								l̪	l̥	l		l̠	ɭ̊	ɭ	ʎ̥	ʎ	ʟ̥	ʟ		ʟ̠				
Lateral tap/flap									ɺ̥	ɺ			𝼈̊	𝼈		ʎ̆		ʟ̆						

		BL	LD	D	A	PA	RF	P	V	U
Implosive	Voiced	ɓ			ɗ		ᶑ	ʄ	ɠ	ʛ
Implosive	Voiceless	ɓ̥			ɗ̥		ᶑ̊	ʄ̊	ɠ̊	ʛ̥
Ejective	Stop	pʼ			tʼ		ʈʼ	cʼ	kʼ	qʼ
Ejective	Affricate		p̪fʼ	tθʼ	tsʼ	tʃʼ	tʂʼ	tɕʼ	kxʼ	qχʼ
Ejective	Fricative	ɸʼ	fʼ	θʼ	sʼ	ʃʼ	ʂʼ	ɕʼ	xʼ	χʼ
Ejective	Lateral affricate				tɬʼ			c𝼆ʼ	k𝼄ʼ	q𝼄ʼ
Ejective	Lateral fricative				ɬʼ					
Click (top: velar; bottom: uvular)	Tenuis	kʘ qʘ		kǀ qǀ	kǃ qǃ		k𝼊 q𝼊	kǂ qǂ		
Click (top: velar; bottom: uvular)	Voiced	ɡʘ ɢʘ		ɡǀ ɢǀ	ɡǃ ɢǃ		ɡ𝼊 ɢ𝼊	ɡǂ ɢǂ		
Click (top: velar; bottom: uvular)	Nasal	ŋʘ ɴʘ		ŋǀ ɴǀ	ŋǃ ɴǃ		ŋ𝼊 ɴ𝼊	ŋǂ ɴǂ	ʞ	
Click (top: velar; bottom: uvular)	Tenuis lateral				kǁ qǁ					
Click (top: velar; bottom: uvular)	Voiced lateral				ɡǁ ɢǁ					
Click (top: velar; bottom: uvular)	Nasal lateral				ŋǁ ɴǁ					
