= Ɱ =

Latin letter M with hook

M with hook

The letter Ɱ (minuscule: ɱ), called M with hook (in some literature referred to as Left-tail M; (Note: 'Left' refers to the direction that the tail is pointing, not the leg placement.) sometimes informally referred to as meng or emg, analogous to eng ⟨ŋ⟩) is a letter based on the letter M. Its minuscule ⟨ɱ⟩ is used to transcribe a voiced labiodental nasal in the International Phonetic Alphabet.

In Americanist tradition, the lowercase ⟨ɱ⟩ has occasionally been used for transcribing a voiced labiodental nasal, as in the IPA, and the uppercase ⟨Ɱ⟩ for a voiceless labiodental nasal.

== Computer encoding ==
Character information
Preview	Ɱ		ɱ	
Unicode name	LATIN CAPITAL LETTER M WITH HOOK		LATIN SMALL LETTER M WITH HOOK	
Encodings	decimal	hex	dec	hex
Unicode	11374	U+2C6E	625	U+0271
UTF-8	226 177 174	E2 B1 AE	201 177	C9 B1
Numeric character reference	&#11374;	&#x2C6E;	&#625;	&#x271;
