= Teuthonista =

Transcription system for High German dialects

Teuthonista is a phonetic transcription system used predominantly for the transcription of (High) German dialects. It is very similar to other Central European transcription systems from the early 20th century. The base characters are mostly based on the Latin alphabet, which can be modified by various diacritics.

== History ==
The name Teuthonista goes back to the Journal Teuthonista, in which the transcription system was presented in 1924/25.

== Symbols ==
Most of the characters derive from the Latin or Greek alphabet, and from earlier systems such as Dania. The consonants are primarily mono-phonemic symbols. Fine nuances in articulation can be distinguished by diacritics (e.g. dots or tildes beneath or across the character). Vowels are distinguished with a more extensive system of diacritics. To describe the various dialectal sounds of the German letter "e", for example, the system uses the letter "e" with trémas, upstrokes, tildes and hooks below, separately and in combination. It is possible to write more than 500 different variants of the letter "e". There are a number of Teuthonista systems that use different base letters and diacritics, and the characters they have in common do not have defined values between systems.

In Reichel (2003), the basic vowel letters are a e i o u. Vowels are stacked for an intermediate articulation (near-low vowels aͤ and aͦ, high-mid vowels iͤ and oͧ, central vowels uͥ and oͤ). Reduced vowels are ɪ ʊ ə α.

Voiced consonants are written with a underdot or overdot, while devoiced consonants are written like the devoiced ones.

The overall consonant chart is as follows:

	Bilabial	Labio- dental	Coronal	Post- alveolar	Palatal	Velar	Uvular	Glottal
Nasal	m		n			ŋ		
Plosive	p, b, ḅ		t, d, ḍ			k, g, ġ		
Affricate	pƒ		tß	tß̌		kꭓ		
Fricative	w	ƒ, ꬵ, v	ß, s, z	ß̌, š, ž	c	ꭓ, x	ʁ	h
Approximant			l		j			
Trill			r				ʀ	

As in the IPA and extIPA, diacritics may doubled for greater degree and placed in parentheses for a lesser degree. For example, ẹ, e᪷ are a close (high) and open (low) e, while e̤, e᪸ are a closer (higher) and more open (lower) e, (Note: With the vowel letters e i o u, the under-dot and hook below mean the vowel is raised or lowered, but with 'a' it means the vowel is fronted or backed. These are similar to the IPA half rings diacritics for raising and lowering used until 1989. Unicode supplies separate code points single and double open marks just for Teuthonista transcription as they look more like hook or small iota than IPA’s left half ring.) and ẹ᪽, e᪷᪽ are only slightly raised and lowered e. Similarly, ë and ẽ are rounded and nasalized e, while ë̈, ẽ̃ are extra-rounded and extra-nasalized e and ë᪻, ẽ᪻ are slightly rounded and nasalized e. Parentheses around a double diacritic, such as ë̈᪻, mean the degree of modification is intermediate between that indicated by a single and a double diacritic.

An example of the shades of sound indicated by diacritics is the following scale from near-high to near-low front vowels:

i᪸ eͥ e̤ e̤᪽ ẹ ẹ᪽ e e᪷᪽ e᪷ e᪸᪽ e᪸ aͤ a̤

== Usage ==
The Teuthonista phonetic transcription system is used by the following projects:

=== Lexicons ===
- Badisches Wörterbuch
- Bayerisches Wörterbuch
- Wörterbuch der bairischen Mundarten in Österreich

=== Linguistic atlases ===
- Sprachatlas der deutschen Schweiz
- Südwestdeutscher Sprachatlas
- Atlas der historischen deutschen Mundarten auf dem Gebiet der Tschechischen Republik
- Sprachatlas von Oberösterreich
- Vorarlberger Sprachatlas
- Teilprojekte des Bayerischen Sprachatlas
  - Sprachatlas von Bayerisch-Schwaben
  - Sprachatlas von Mittelfranken
  - Sprachatlas von Unterfranken
  - Sprachatlas von Niederbayern
  - Sprachatlas von Nordostbayern
  - Sprachatlas von Oberbayern

== See also ==
- Dania transcription
- Unicode ranges Latin Extended-E, Combining Diacritical Marks Supplement (overscript consonants), Combining Diacritical Marks Extended
