= Palatal hook =

Diacritical mark

N with palatal hook, followed by eng (a velar nasal), a palatal nasal and a retroflex nasal for comparison.

The palatal hook (◌̡) is a hook diacritic formerly used in the International Phonetic Alphabet to mark palatalized consonants. It is a small, leftwards-facing hook joined to the bottom-right side of a letter that derives from a subscript letter j, and it is distinct from other IPA hooks that indicate retroflexion, implosion and rhotic vowels. Theoretically, it could be used on all IPA consonant letters – even on those used for palatal consonants – but it is not attested on all of the IPA letters of its era. It was withdrawn by the IPA in 1989, in favor of a superscript j following the consonant (i.e., ⟨ƫ⟩ was replaced with ⟨tʲ⟩).

The IPA recommended that esh ⟨ ʃ ⟩ and ezh ⟨ʒ⟩ not use the palatal hook, but instead get special curled symbols: ⟨ ʆ ⟩ and ⟨ʓ⟩. The same has been done with ⟨ɮ⟩: ⟨𝽧⟩. However, versions with the hook have been used and are supported by Unicode, excluding unattested ⟨ɮ⟩.

Palatal hooks are also used for Lithuanian dialectology in the Lithuanian Phonetic Transcription System (or Lithuanian Phonetic Alphabet), including the exceptional form ꞔ, which while graphically resembling a c plus palatal hook is actually a variant of the ᶃ once recommended by the IPA.

== Scope ==
The palatal hook was introduced in 1921 and officially adopted in 1928. The last published IPA chart to support it was that of 1979. The following single non-palatal consonants appear on that chart. Those attested with palatal hook are bolded. The columns for palatal letters are omitted; they are generally redundant with the hook, though 'palatalized palatals' are sometimes described in the literature. C with hook, ꞔ, is not a palatal letter but a script variant of ᶃ.

ᶆ		ɱ				ᶇ		ɳ				𝼔		ɴ						
ᶈ	ᶀ					ƫ	ᶁ	ʈ	ɖ			ᶄ	ᶃ/ꞔ	𝼴	𝼰				ʔ	
𝼳	𝼻	ᶂ	ᶌ	𝼼	𝼯	ᶊ	ᶎ	ʂ	ʐ	ᶋ/ʆ*	𝼘/ʓ*	ᶍ	𝼱	𝼽	𝼶	ʍ	𝼲	𝼺	ꞕ	ɦ
		𝼹				𝼕		ɻ				ɰ				𝾂 (w̡)				
						𝼓	𝽧*													
						ᶅ		ɭ												
						ᶉ								𝼵						
						𝼖		𝼷						𝼵						
	ɓ						𝼭						ɠ							
ʘ				ʇ		ʗ														
						ʖ														

*ʃ, ʒ and ɮ occur with a palatal curl, which was the preferred forms for these letters in the IPA of their era.

W with hook, 𝾂, is attested as a convenient transcription for a palatalized bilabial approximant; ɗ with a hook, 𝼭, had been used for [ʄ].

Other non-palatal consonants are listed under the 1979 chart:

- ᵵ, **ɫ̡** (etc.): These should be typeset with the hook letter and an overstruck tilde diacritic or vice versa.
- ɼ. [Used for Czech, does not occur palatalized.]
- ɺ.
- ɧ. [Used for Swedish, does not occur palatalized.]
- The sibilant affricates **𝼸, 𝼗 𝼒**. (The latter pair also have palatal curl forms 𝼬 𝼫.) The affricate 𝼮 is implied but not listed.

== Computer encoding ==
Unicode includes a combining character for the palatal hook, but it is not canonically equivalent to the precomposed characters, which should be used instead.

Precomposed Unicode characters with palatal hook
Code point	Character	Name
U+01AB	ƫ	LATIN SMALL LETTER T WITH PALATAL HOOK
U+1D80	ᶀ	LATIN SMALL LETTER B WITH PALATAL HOOK
U+1D81	ᶁ	LATIN SMALL LETTER D WITH PALATAL HOOK
U+1D82	ᶂ	LATIN SMALL LETTER F WITH PALATAL HOOK
U+1D83	ᶃ	LATIN SMALL LETTER G WITH PALATAL HOOK
U+1D84	ᶄ	LATIN SMALL LETTER K WITH PALATAL HOOK
U+1D85	ᶅ	LATIN SMALL LETTER L WITH PALATAL HOOK
U+1D86	ᶆ	LATIN SMALL LETTER M WITH PALATAL HOOK
U+1D87	ᶇ	LATIN SMALL LETTER N WITH PALATAL HOOK
U+1D88	ᶈ	LATIN SMALL LETTER P WITH PALATAL HOOK
U+1D89	ᶉ	LATIN SMALL LETTER R WITH PALATAL HOOK
U+1D8A	ᶊ	LATIN SMALL LETTER S WITH PALATAL HOOK
U+1D8B	ᶋ	LATIN SMALL LETTER ESH WITH PALATAL HOOK
U+1D8C	ᶌ	LATIN SMALL LETTER V WITH PALATAL HOOK
U+1D8D	ᶍ	LATIN SMALL LETTER X WITH PALATAL HOOK
U+1D8E	ᶎ	LATIN SMALL LETTER Z WITH PALATAL HOOK
U+1DAA	ᶪ	MODIFIER LETTER SMALL L WITH PALATAL HOOK
U+1DB5	ᶵ	MODIFIER LETTER SMALL T WITH PALATAL HOOK
U+A794	ꞔ	LATIN SMALL LETTER C WITH PALATAL HOOK
U+A795	ꞕ	LATIN SMALL LETTER H WITH PALATAL HOOK
U+A7C4	Ꞔ	LATIN CAPITAL LETTER C WITH PALATAL HOOK
U+A7C6	Ᶎ	LATIN CAPITAL LETTER Z WITH PALATAL HOOK
U+1DF12	𝼒	LATIN SMALL LETTER DEZH DIGRAPH WITH PALATAL HOOK
U+1DF14	𝼔	LATIN SMALL LETTER ENG WITH PALATAL HOOK
U+1DF15	𝼕	LATIN SMALL LETTER TURNED R WITH PALATAL HOOK
U+1DF17	𝼗	LATIN SMALL LETTER TESH DIGRAPH WITH PALATAL HOOK
U+1DF18	𝼘	LATIN SMALL LETTER EZH WITH PALATAL HOOK
U+1DF2E	𝼮	LATIN SMALL LETTER DZ DIGRAPH WITH PALATAL HOOK
U+1DF2F	𝼯	LATIN SMALL LETTER ETH WITH PALATAL HOOK
U+1DF30	𝼰	LATIN LETTER SMALL CAPITAL G WITH PALATAL HOOK
U+1DF31	𝼱	LATIN SMALL LETTER GAMMA WITH PALATAL HOOK
U+1DF33	𝼳	LATIN SMALL LETTER PHI WITH PALATAL HOOK
U+1DF34	𝼴	LATIN SMALL LETTER Q WITH PALATAL HOOK
U+1DF35	𝼵	LATIN LETTER SMALL CAPITAL R WITH PALATAL HOOK
U+1DF36	𝼶	LATIN LETTER SMALL CAPITAL INVERTED R WITH PALATAL HOOK
U+1DF38	𝼸	LATIN SMALL LETTER TS DIGRAPH WITH PALATAL HOOK
U+1DF3A	𝼺	LATIN LETTER PHARYNGEAL VOICED FRICATIVE WITH PALATAL HOOK
U+1DF3B	𝼻	LATIN SMALL LETTER BETA WITH PALATAL HOOK
U+1DF3C	𝼼	LATIN SMALL LETTER THETA WITH PALATAL HOOK
U+1DF3D	𝼽	LATIN SMALL LETTER CHI WITH PALATAL HOOK
U+1DFF5	𝿵	MODIFIER LETTER SMALL D WITH PALATAL HOOK
U+1DFF6	𝿶	MODIFIER LETTER SMALL H WITH PALATAL HOOK
U+1DFF7	𝿷	MODIFIER LETTER SMALL N WITH PALATAL HOOK
U+1DFF8	𝿸	MODIFIER LETTER SMALL S WITH PALATAL HOOK
U+1DFF9	𝿹	MODIFIER LETTER SMALL Z WITH PALATAL HOOK
