= Caron =

Diacritical mark (◌̌)

◌̌o

Caron
- U+030C ◌̌ COMBINING CARON

A caron (/ˈkærən/ KARR-ən) or háček (/ˈhɑːtʃɛk, ˈhætʃɛk, ˈheɪtʃɛk/ HAH-chek, HATCH-ek, HAY-chek, plural háčeks or háčky) (Note: Also known as a hachek, wedge, check, kvačica, strešica, mäkčeň, varnelė, paukščiukas, inverted circumflex, inverted hat, flying bird, or inverted chevron. Háček is Czech for "little hook".), is a diacritic mark (◌̌) placed over certain letters in the orthography of some languages, to indicate a change of the related letter's pronunciation. Typographers tend to use the term caron, while linguists prefer the Czech word háček.

The symbol is common in the Baltic, Slavic, Finnic, Samic and Berber language families. Its use differs according to the orthographic rules of a language. In most Slavic and other European languages it indicates present or historical palatalization (e → ě; [e] → [ʲe]), iotation, or postalveolar articulation (c → č; [ts] → [tʃ]). In Salishan languages, it often represents a uvular consonant (x → x̌; [x] → [χ]). When placed over vowel symbols, the caron can indicate a contour tone, for instance the falling and then rising tone in the Pinyin romanization of Mandarin Chinese. It is also used to decorate symbols in mathematics, where it is often pronounced /ˈtʃɛk/ ("check").

The caron is shaped approximately like a small letter "v". For serif typefaces, the caron generally has one of two forms: either symmetrical, essentially identical to an inverted circumflex; or with the left stroke thicker than the right, like the usual serif form of the letter "v" (v, but without serifs). The latter form is often preferred by Czech designers for use in Czech, while for other uses the symmetrical form tends to predominate, as it does also among sans-serif typefaces.

The caron is not to be confused with the breve (◌̆, which is curved rather than angled):

Breve vs. caron
Breve	Ă ă Ĕ ĕ Ğ ğ Ĭ ĭ Ŏ ŏ Ŭ ŭ Y̆ y̆
Caron	Ǎ ǎ Ě ě Ǧ ǧ Ǐ ǐ Ǒ ǒ Ǔ ǔ Y̌ y̌

== Names ==
Different disciplines generally refer to this diacritic mark by different names. Typography tends to use the term caron. Linguistics more often uses the Czech word háček. Pullum's and Ladusaw's Phonetic Symbol Guide uses the term wedge.

The term caron is used in the official names of Unicode characters (e.g., "LATIN CAPITAL LETTER C WITH CARON"). The Unicode Consortium explicitly states that the reason for this is unknown, but its earliest known use was in the United States Government Printing Office Style Manual of 1967, and it was later used in character sets such as DIN 31624 (1979), ISO 5426 (1980), ISO/IEC 6937 (1983) and ISO/IEC 8859-2 (1985). Its actual origin remains obscure, but some have suggested that it may derive from a fusion of caret and macron. Though this may be folk etymology, it is plausible, particularly in the absence of other suggestions. A Unicode technical note states that the name "hacek" should have been used instead.

The Oxford English Dictionary gives 1953 as the earliest appearance in English for háček. In Czech, háček ([ˈɦaːtʃɛk]) means 'small hook', the diminutive form of hák ([ˈɦaːk], 'hook')". The name appears in most English dictionaries, but they treat the long mark (acute accent) differently. British dictionaries, such as the OED, ODE, CED, write háček (with the mark) in the headwords, while American ones, such as the Merriam-Webster, NOAD, AHD, incorrectly omit the acute and write haček; however, the NOAD gives háček as an alternative spelling.

In Slovak it is called mäkčeň ([ˈmɛɐktʂeɲ], i.e., 'softener' or 'palatalization mark'), in Serbo-Croatian kvaka or kvačica (Cyrillic: квака or квачица, 'angled hook' or 'small angled hook'), in Slovenian strešica ('little roof') or kljukica ('little hook'), in Lithuanian paukščiukas ('little bird') or varnelė ('little jackdaw'), in Estonian katus ('roof'), in Finnish hattu ('hat'), and in Lakota ičášleče ('wedge').

== Origin ==
The caron evolved from the dot above diacritic, which Jan Hus introduced into Czech orthography (along with the acute accent) in his De Orthographia Bohemica (1412). The original form still exists in Polish ż. However, Hus's work was hardly known at that time, and háček became widespread only in the 16th century with the introduction of printing.

== Usage ==
For the fricatives š [ʃ], ž [ʒ], and the affricate č [tʃ] only, the caron is used in most northwestern Uralic languages that use the Latin alphabet, such as Karelian, Veps, Northern Sami, and Inari Sami (although not in Southern Sami). Estonian and Finnish use š and ž (but not č), but only for transcribing foreign names and loanwords (albeit common loanwords such as šekki or tšekk 'check'); the sounds (and letters) are native and common in Karelian, Veps, and Sami.

In Italian, š, ž, and č are routinely used as in Slovenian to transcribe Slavic names in the Cyrillic script since in native Italian words, the sounds represented by these letters must be followed by a vowel, and Italian uses ch for /k/, not /tʃ/. Other Romance languages, by contrast, tend to use their own orthographies.

The caron is also used in the Romany alphabet. The Faggin-Nazzi writing system for Friulian makes use of the caron over the letters c, g, and s.

The caron is also often used as a diacritical mark on consonants for romanization of text from non-Latin writing systems, particularly in the scientific transliteration of Slavic languages. Philologists and the standard Finnish orthography often prefer using it to express sounds for which English require a digraph (sh, ch, and zh) because most Slavic languages use only one character to spell the sounds (the key exceptions are Polish sz and cz). Its use for that purpose can even be found in the United States because certain atlases use it in romanization of foreign place names. On the typographical side, Š/š and Ž/ž are likely the easiest among non-Western European diacritic characters to adopt for Westerners because the two are part of the Windows-1252 character encoding.

Esperanto uses the circumflex over c, g, h, j, and s in similar ways; the circumflex was chosen because there was no caron on most Western European typewriters, but the circumflex existed on French ones.

It is also used as an accent mark on vowels to indicate the tone of a syllable. The main example is in Pinyin for Chinese in which it represents a falling-rising tone. It is used in transliterations of Thai to indicate a rising tone.

=== Phonetics ===
The caron above ⟨ǎ⟩ represents a rising tone in the International Phonetic Alphabet. The caron below ⟨p̬⟩ represents voicing. In Americanist phonetic notation to indicate various types of pronunciation.

=== Writing and printing carons ===
In printed Czech and Slovak text, the caron combined with certain letters (lower-case ť, ď, ľ, and upper-case Ľ) is reduced to a small stroke or apostrophe. That is optional in handwritten text. Latin fonts are typically set to display this way by default. Using the combining grapheme joiner, U+034F, between the letter and the combining mark, as in t͏̌, d͏̌, l͏̌, L͏̌, should force the display of the conventional caron.

In Laz orthography, the lower-case ǩ with caron sometimes has its caron reduced to a stroke, while the lower-case t͏̌ with caron preserves its caron shape.

Although the stroke looks similar to an apostrophe, the kerning is significantly different. Using an apostrophe in place of a caron can be perceived as an error, but it is still often found on imported goods meant for sale in the Czech Republic and Slovakia (compare t’ to ť, L’ahko to Ľahko). (Apostrophes appearing as palatalization marks in some Finnic languages, such as Võro and Karelian, are not forms of caron either.) Foreigners also sometimes mistake the caron for the acute accent (compare Ĺ to Ľ, ĺ to ľ).

=== In Balto-Slavic languages ===
The following are the Czech and Slovak letters and digraphs with the caron (Czech: háček, Slovak: mäkčeň):

- Č/č (pronounced [t͡ʃ], similar to 'ch' in cheap: Česká republika, which means Czech Republic)
- Š/š (pronounced [ʃ], similar to 'sh' in she: in Škoda)
- Ž/ž (pronounced [ʒ], similar to 's' in treasure: žal 'sorrow')
- Ř/ř (only in Czech: a special voiced or unvoiced fricative trill [r̝] or [r̝̊], the former transcribed as [ɼ] in pre-1989 IPA: Antonín Dvořák)
- Ď/ď, Ť/ť, Ň/ň (palatals, pronounced [ɟ], [c], [ɲ], slightly different from palatalized consonants as found in Russian): Ďábel a sťatý kůň, 'The Devil and a beheaded horse')
- Ľ/ľ (only in Slovak, pronounced as palatal [ʎ]: podnikateľ, 'businessman')
- DŽ/Dž/dž (considered a single letter in Slovak and two letters in Czech, pronounced [d͡ʒ] džungľa "jungle" - identical to the j sound in jungle and the g in genius, found mostly in borrowings.)
- Ě/ě (only in Czech) indicates mostly palatalization of preceding consonant:
  - dě, tě, ně are [ɟɛ], [cɛ], [ɲɛ];
  - but mě is [mɲɛ] or [mjɛ], and bě, pě, vě, fě are [bjɛ, pjɛ, vjɛ, fjɛ].
- Furthermore, until the 19th century, Ǧ/ǧ was used to represent [g] while G/g was used to represent [j].

In Lower Sorbian and Upper Sorbian, the following letters and digraphs have the caron:

- Č/č (pronounced [t͡ʃ] like 'ch' in cheap)
- Š/š (pronounced [ʃ] like 'sh' in she)
- Ž/ž (pronounced [ʒ] like 's' in treasure)
- Ř/ř (only in Upper Sorbian: pronounced [ʃ] like 'sh' in she)
- Tř/tř (digraph, only in Upper Sorbian, soft (palatalized) [t͡s] sound)
- Ě/ě (pronounced [e] like 'e' in bed)

Balto-Slavic, Croatian, Serbian, Slovenian, Latvian and Lithuanian use č, š and ž. The digraph dž is also used in these languages but is considered a separate letter only in Croatian and Serbian Latin (Serbian Cyrillic equivalent is the letter Џ/џ). The Belarusian Lacinka alphabet also contains the digraph dž (as a separate letter), and Latin transcriptions of Bulgarian and Macedonian may use them at times, for transcription of the letter-combination ДЖ (Bulgarian) and the letter Џ (Macedonian).

=== In Uralic languages ===
In the Finnic languages, Estonian (and transcriptions to Finnish) uses Š/š and Ž/ž, and Karelian uses Č/č, Š/š and Ž/ž. Dž is not a separate letter. Č is present because it may be phonemically geminate: in Karelian, the phoneme 'čč' is found, and is distinct from 'č', which is not the case in Finnish or Estonian, for which only one length is recognized for 'tš'. (Incidentally, in transcriptions, Finnish orthography has to employ complicated notations like mettšä or even the mettshä to express Karelian meččä.) On some Finnish keyboards, it is possible to write those letters by typing s or z while holding right Alt key or AltGr key, though that is not supported by the Microsoft Windows keyboard device driver KBDFI.DLL for the Finnish language. The Finnish multilingual keyboard layout allows typing the letters Š/š and Ž/ž by pressing AltGr+'+S for š and AltGr+'+Z for ž.

In Estonian, Finnish and Karelian these are not palatalized but postalveolar consonants. For example, Estonian Nissi (palatalized) is distinct from nišši (postalveolar). Palatalization is typically ignored in spelling, but some Karelian and Võro orthographies use an apostrophe (') or an acute accent (´). In Finnish and Estonian, š and ž (and in Estonian, very rarely č) appear in loanwords and foreign proper names only and when not available, they can be substituted with 'h': 'sh' for 'š', in print.

In the orthographies of the Sami languages, the letters Č/č, Š/š and Ž/ž appear in Northern Sami, Inari Sami and Skolt Sami. Skolt Sami also uses three other consonants with the caron: Ǯ/ǯ (ezh-caron) to mark the voiced postalveolar affricate [dʒ] (plain Ʒ/ʒ marks the alveolar affricate [dz]), Ǧ/ǧ to mark the voiced palatal affricate [ɟʝ] and Ǩ/ǩ the corresponding voiceless palatal affricate [cç]. More often than not, they are geminated: vuäǯǯad "to get". The orthographies of the more southern Sami languages of Sweden and Norway such as Lule Sami do not use caron, and prefer instead the digraphs tj and sj.

==== Finno-Ugric transcription ====
Most other Uralic languages (including Kildin Sami) are normally written with Cyrillic instead of the Latin script. In their scientific transcription, the Finno-Ugric Transcription / Uralic Phonetic Alphabet however employs the letters š, ž and occasionally č, ǯ (alternately tš, dž) for the postalveolar consonants. These serve as basic letters, and with further diacritics are used to transcribe also other fricative and affricate sounds. Retroflex consonants are marked by a caron and an underdot (ṣ̌, ẓ̌ = IPA [ʂ], [ʐ]), alveolo-palatal (palatalized postalveolar) consonants by a caron and an acute (š́, ž́ = IPA [ɕ], [ʑ]). Thus, for example, the postalveolar consonants of the Udmurt language, normally written as Ж/ж, Ӝ/ӝ, Ӵ/ӵ, Ш/ш are in Uralic studies normally transcribed as ž, ǯ, č, š respectively, and the alveolo-palatal consonants normally written as Зь/зь, Ӟ/ӟ, Сь/сь, Ч/ч are normally transcribed as ž́, ǯ́, š́, č́ respectively.

=== In other languages ===
In the Berber Latin alphabet of the Berber language (North Africa) the following letters and digraphs are used with the caron:

- Č/č (pronounced [t͡ʃ] like the English "ch" in China)
- Ǧ/ǧ (pronounced [d͡ʒ] like the English "j" in the words "joke" and "James")
- Ř/ř (only in Riffian Berber: pronounced [r]) (no English equivalent).

Finnish Kalo uses Ȟ/ȟ.

Lakota uses Č/č, Š/š, Ž/ž, Ǧ/ǧ (voiced post-velar fricative) and Ȟ/ȟ (plain post-velar fricative).

Indonesian uses ě (e with caron) informally to mark the schwa (Indonesian: pepet).

Many alphabets of African languages use the caron to mark the rising tone, as in the African reference alphabet.

=== Other transcription and transliteration systems ===
The DIN 31635 standard for transliteration of Arabic uses Ǧ/ǧ to represent the letter ج. ǧīm, on account of the inconsistent pronunciation of J in European languages, the variable pronunciation of the letter in educated Arabic [d͡ʒ~ʒ~ɟ~ɡ], and the desire of the DIN committee to have a one-to-one correspondence of Arabic to Latin letters in its system.

Romanization of Pashto uses Č/č, Š/š, Ž/ž, X̌/x̌, to represent the letters چ, ش, ژ, ښ, respectively. Additionally, Ṣ̌/ṣ̌ and Ẓ̌/ẓ̌ are used by the southern Pashto dialect only (replaced by X̌/x̌ and Ǵ/ǵ in the north).

The latter Š/š is also used to transcribe the /ʃ/ phoneme in Sumerian and Akkadian cuneiform, and the /ʃ/ phoneme in Semitic languages represented by the letter shin (Phoenician and its descendants).

The caron is also used in Mandarin Chinese pinyin romanization and orthographies of several other tonal languages to indicate the "falling-rising" tone (similar to the pitch made when asking "Huh?"). The caron can be placed over the vowels: ǎ, ě, ǐ, ǒ, ǔ, ǚ. The alternative to a caron is a number 3 after the syllable: hǎo = hao3, as the "falling-rising" tone is the third tone in Mandarin.

The caron is used in the New Transliteration System of D'ni in the symbol š to represent the sound [ʃ] (English "sh").

A-caron (ǎ) is also used to transliterate the Cyrillic letter Ъ (er golyam) in Bulgarian—it represents the mid back unrounded vowel [ɤ̞].

Caron marks a falling and rising tone (bǔ, bǐ) in Fon languages.

== Letters with caron ==
Unicode encodes a number of cases of "letter with caron" as precomposed characters and these are displayed below. In addition, many more symbols may be composed using the combining character facility (U+030C ◌̌ COMBINING CARON and U+032C ◌̬ COMBINING CARON BELOW) that may be used with any letter or other diacritic to create a customised symbol but this does not mean that the result has any real-world application; such customised characters are not shown in the table.

- Caron ◌̌ Ǎ ǎ
- Č č
- Ď ď
- Ě ě
- Ǧ ǧ
- Ȟ ȟ
- Ǐ ǐ
- J̌ ǰ
- Ǩ ǩ
- Ľ ľ
- Ň ň
- Ǒ ǒ
- Ř ř
- Š š
- Ṧ ṧ
- Š́ š́
- Ť ť
- Ǔ ǔ
- Ǚ ǚ
- Ž ž
- Ǯ ǯ

There are a number of Cyrillic letters with caron but they do not have precomposed characters and thus must be generated using the combining character method. These are: В̌ в̌; Ǯ ǯ; Г̌ г̌; Ғ̌ ғ̌; Д̌ д̌; З̌ з̌; Р̌ р̌; Т̌ т̌; Х̌ х̌

== Software ==
=== Unicode ===
For legacy reasons, most letters that carry carons are precomposed characters in Unicode, but a caron can also be added to any letter by using the combining character U+030C ◌̌ COMBINING CARON, for example: b̌ q̌ J̌. The modifier letter version is encoded with U+02C7 ˇ CARON.

The characters Č, č, Ě, ě, Š, š, Ž, ž are a part of the Unicode Latin Extended-A set because they occur in Czech and other official languages in Europe, while the rest are in Latin Extended-B.

Unicode also encodes U+032C ◌̬ COMBINING CARON BELOW, for example: p̬; and U+1ACF ◌᫏ COMBINING DOUBLE CARON, for example: x᫏.

== See also ==
- Acute accent
- Apostrophe
- Breve
- Caret
- Circumflex accent
- Sicilicus
- Soft sign (ь)
