= P̬ =

P̬ a voiced [p] sound, which differs from the [b] sound. It is found as a common example of the caron below diacritic.
