= Es with diaeresis =

Cyrillic letter

Usage
- Writing system: Cyrillic
- Type: Alphabetic
- Sound values: /θ/

Es with diaeresis (С̈ с̈; italics: С̈ с̈) is an additional letter of the Cyrillic script which was used in the Bashkir alphabet of Nikolai Katanov for IPA /θ/. It is composed of the letter es ⟨С⟩ with a diaeresis. It was notably used in a Bashkir translation of the gospel by the Bible society published in 1902. It was transliterated using the letter the ⟨Ҫ⟩ in the Bashkir Cyrillic alphabet of 1938.

== Computing codes ==
Being a relatively recent letter, not present in any legacy 8-bit Cyrillic encoding, the letter С̈ is not represented directly by a precomposed character in Unicode either; it has to be composed as С+◌̈ (U+0308).

Character information
Preview	С		с		̈	
Unicode name	CYRILLIC CAPITAL LETTER ES		CYRILLIC SMALL LETTER ES		COMBINING DIAERESIS	
Encodings	decimal	hex	dec	hex	dec	hex
Unicode	1057	U+0421	1089	U+0441	776	U+0308
UTF-8	208 161	D0 A1	209 129	D1 81	204 136	CC 88
Numeric character reference	&#1057;	&#x421;	&#1089;	&#x441;	&#776;	&#x308;
Named character reference	&Scy;		&scy;			

== Bibliography ==
- Инжил (Евпнгелие): Евпнгелие на башкирском языке (in Bashkir). Bible Society. 1902.
- И. Галяутдинов. "Из истории языковых и культурных процессов в Башкортостане в XIX — начале XX вв". Ватандаш (in Russian). Archived from the original on July 15, 2020.
