= Gulmit =

Gulmit گلمیت
- Town
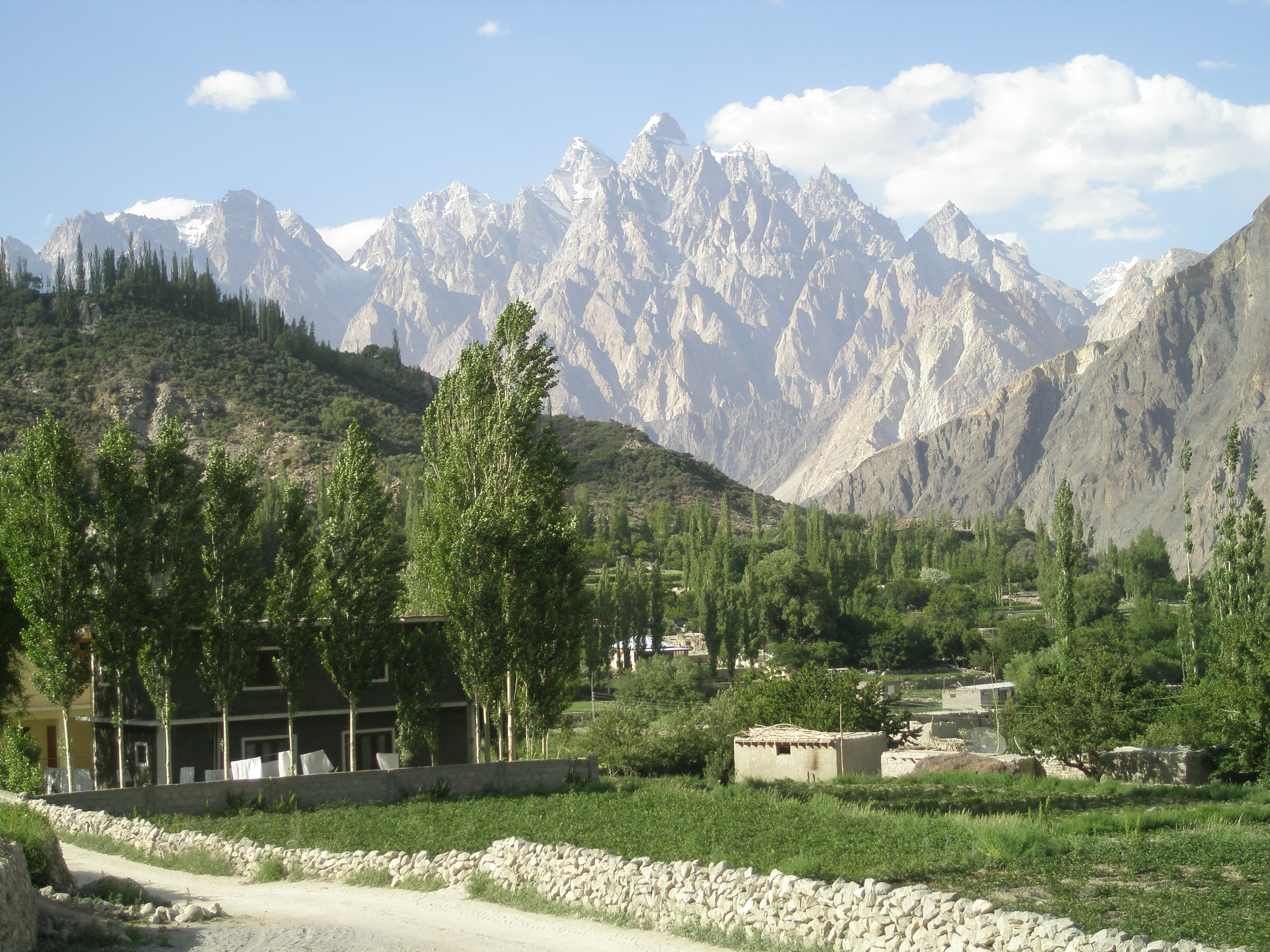
- A view of Tupopdan from Gulmit
- Interactive map of Gulmit
- Location within Gilgit Baltistan Location within Pakistan
- Coordinates: 36.385°N 74.865°E
- Country: Pakistan
- Province: Gilgit Baltistan
- District: Hunza
- Tehsil: Gojal
- Elevation: 2,465 m (8,087 ft)

Population (2016)
  - Total: more than 5,000
- Time zone: UTC+5:30 (IST)
- Climate: BWk

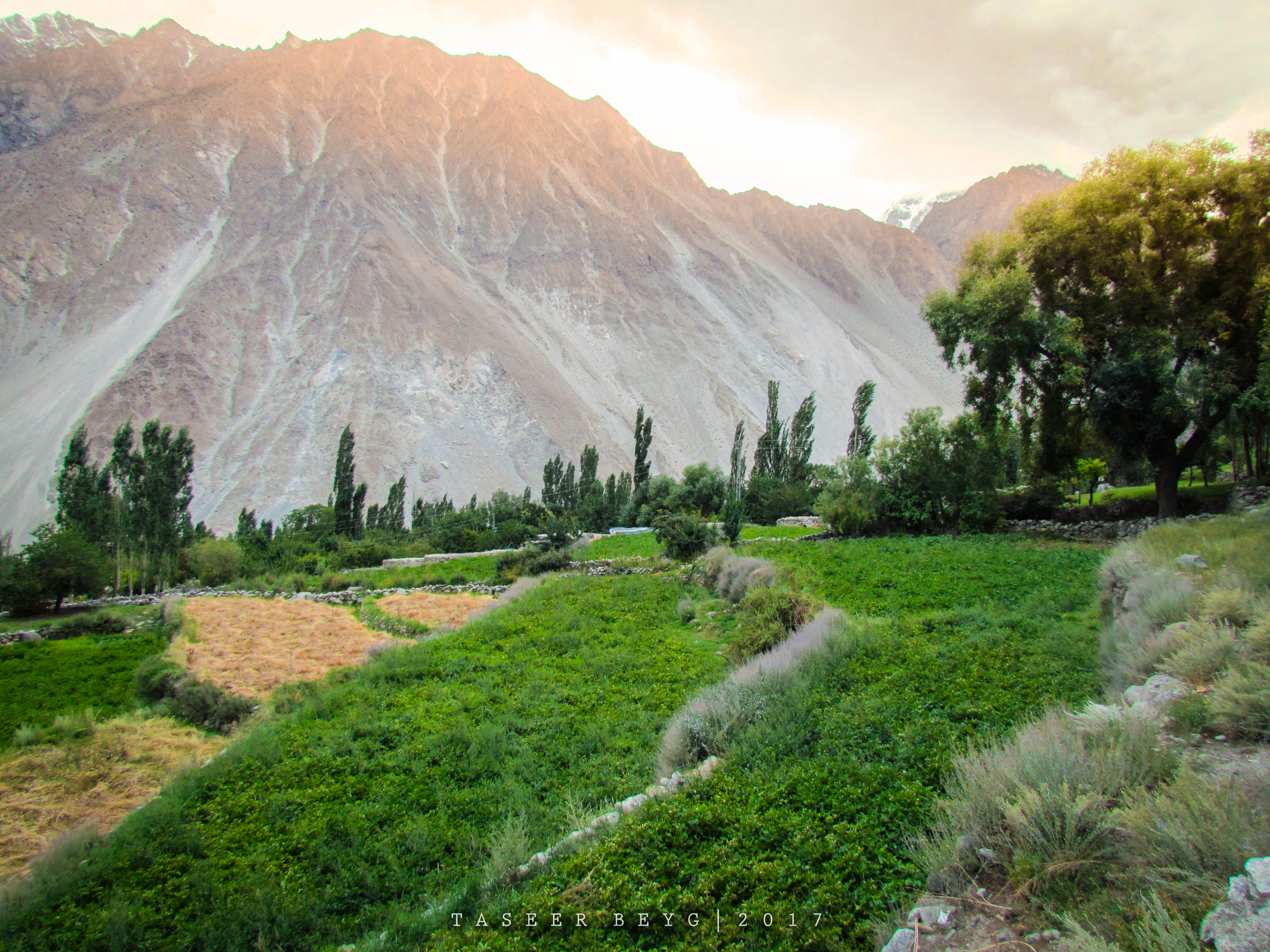
Gulmit Village, Gojal

Gulmit (Wakhi/Urdu: گلمت), also known as Gul-e-Gulmit, is a town in upper Hunza Gilgit Baltistan, Pakistan. Gulmit is a centuries-old historic town, with mountains, peaks and glaciers. It is a tourist spot and has many historic places, hotels, and a museum.

== History ==
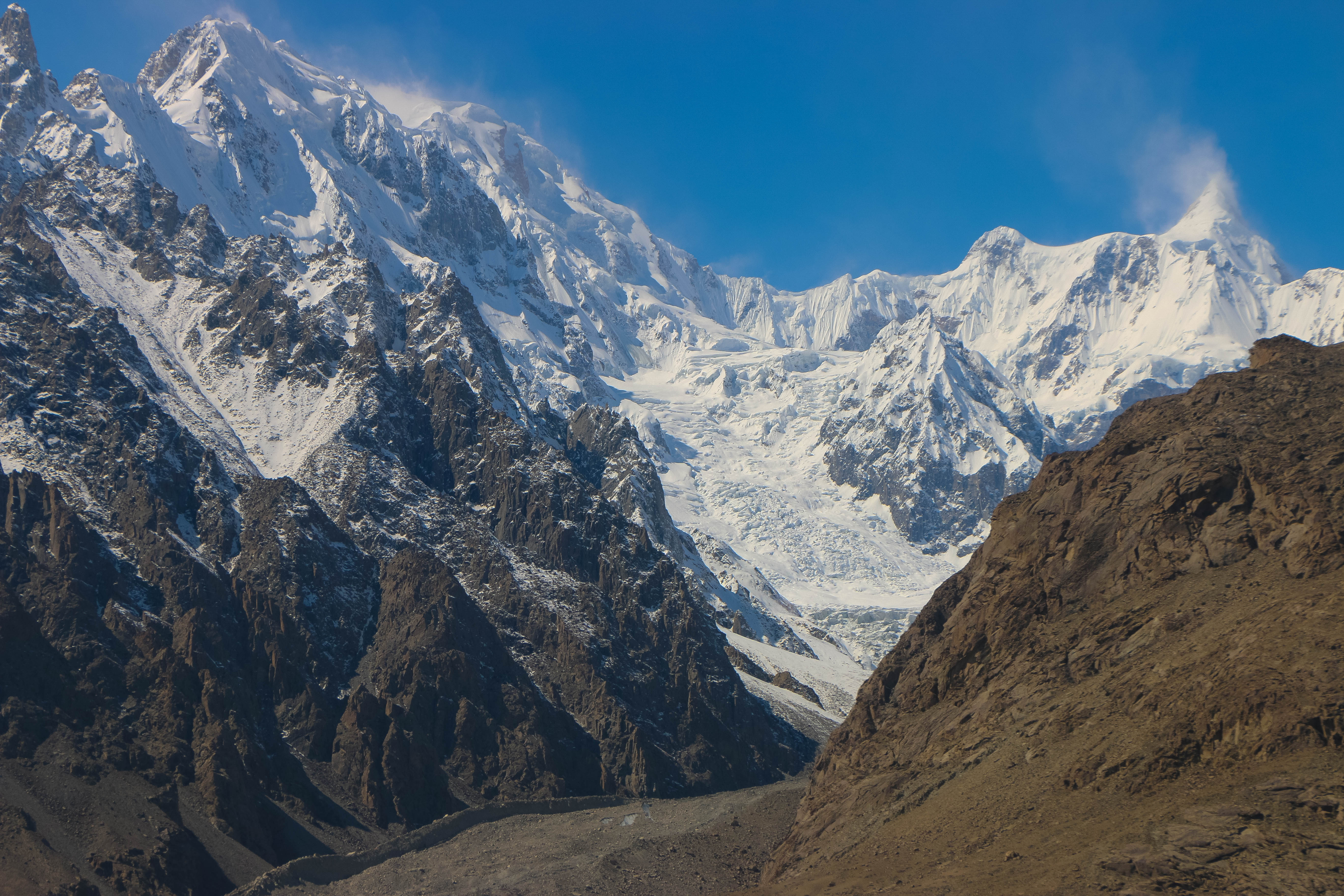
The nearby Gulmit glacier is named after the town and surrounding region.

Before 1974, Hunza was a princely state, and Gulmit was the summer capital of the state. After the abolition of the state it became the tehsil's seat of government. The oldest intact house in Gulmit is more than six centuries old. Most people in Gojal Valley have Central Asian ancestry. The people speak Wakhi language and belong to the Shia Ismaili sect of Islam.

There are many forts and fortresses in Gojal valley, such as Qalanderchi fort in Misghar valley and Rashit fort in Chipursan valley, but Ondra fort is the most prominent. This fort perches on Ondra hill, which overlooks Gulmit and Ghulkin villages. The fort is believed to have been built by Qutlug Baig in the 16th century. He was the first Wakhi ruler to establish rule in Gulmit, threatening the Mir of Hunza. Before him, Gulmit was under the control of Hazur Jamshid (1550-1556), the ruler of Gilgit. His sons Su Malik and Mir Malik were deputed to collect taxes from Gojal. Once, returning from a visit to collect tax from Yishkook in Chipursan valley, the two stopped in Gulmit and liked it. They decided to live in Gulmit. After the death of Hazur Jamshid, Su Malik, the elder son, rushed to Gilgit to sit on his father's throne. He became the new ruler of Gilgit (1556-1578). According to Muhammad Zia, celebrated genealogy-keeper (zon) of Gulmit, Mir Malik also eventually left for Hunza. Taking advantage of the absence of Su Malik and Mir Malik, Qutlug Baig with the help of locals captured Gulmit and the surrounding villages. Qutlug Baig belonged to the Charshambi Kator lineage of the Wakhis of Gulmit.

The territory of Qutlug Baig started from Khyber village and ended at Shishkat. To secure his territory from invaders, he built two gates, one at Khyber and the other at Shishkat. The gates were closed at night and opened during the day. In wartime, these gates remained closed, keeping enemies away from his dominion. The remains of both gates and fortification walls can still be seen at Khyber as well as in Shishkat.

To rein in the advance of enemies from north and south, Quitlug Baig built Ondra fort. To the north lay the State of Hunza, and to the South the power of Kirghiz invaders who used to attack Gulmit to control the pastures for their livestock.

The fort's ramparts ranges from 6 to 13 feet above the ground. There were many living quarters inside the fort. One can still find them at two places, on the southern side and the other on the northern side. These living quarters were separated by a central wall of the fort that runs east-west. The central rampart is higher than the southern and northern fortification walls. The northern quarters were constructed for the army of Qutlug to keep an eye on the enemy advancing from the north, while the southern quarters were built to keep check on the enemy coming from the south, particularly the army of the Mir of Hunza. The fortification walls have embrasure and merlons. Only the northern and southern fortification walls have been provided embrasure. All the ramparts of the fort are still in a good condition. However, the eastern and western fortification walls are in a crumbling condition.

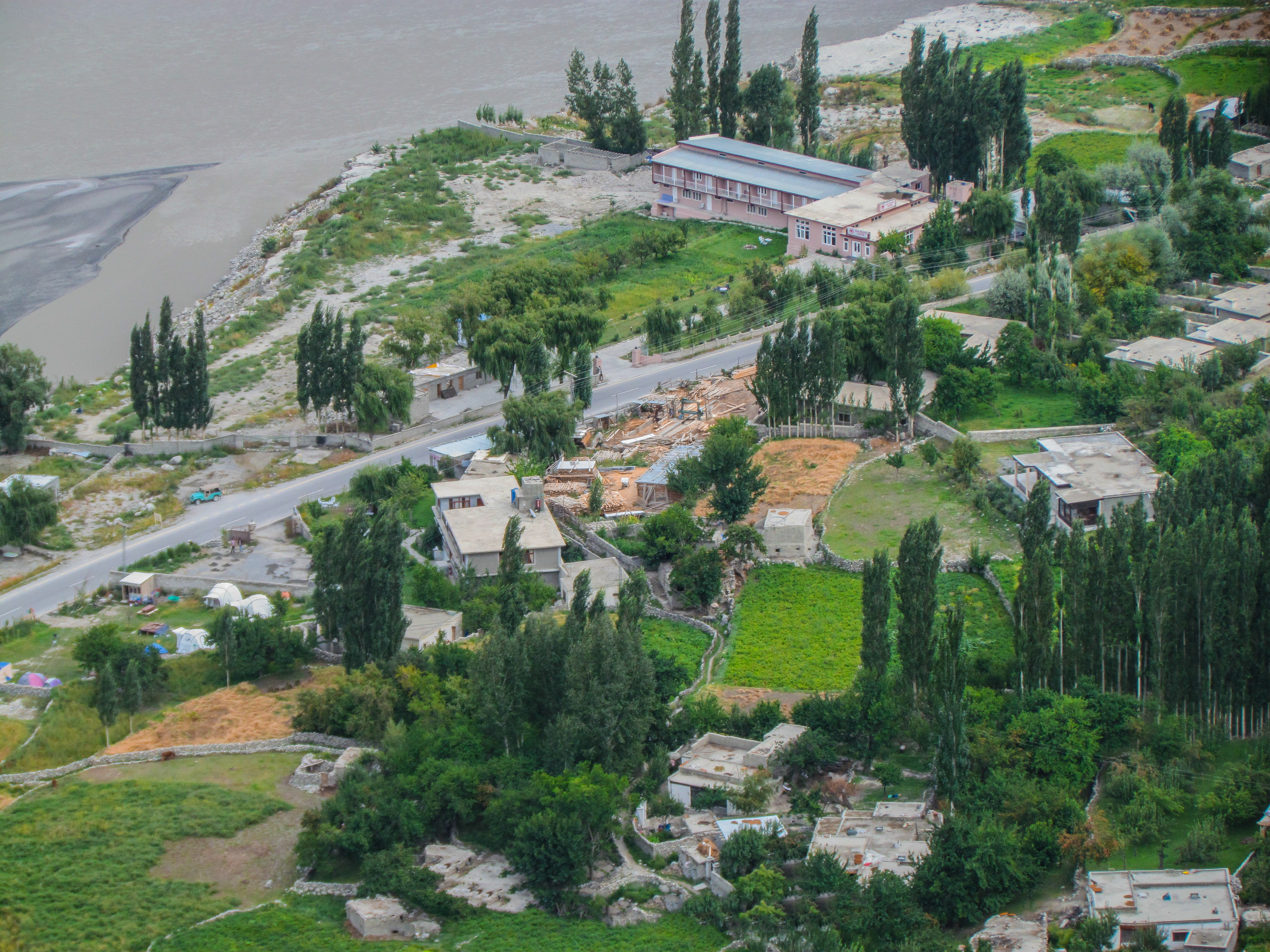
View of Gulmit village

To secure his territory from invaders, he built two gates which were closed at night and opened during the day The Ondra fort reflects the power of the Wakhi ruler Qutlug who was never defeated by the Mirs of Hunza. He was known for his gallantry and swordsmanship in the battlefield. Mirs of Hunza were scared by the rising power of Qutlug. They never dared to cross his territory. Qutlug was poisoned to death by one of his elderly female servants. She was sent by then Mir of Hunza Mir Malik. She administered poison in the food of Qutlug and his courtesans. After the death of Qutllug, Gulmit was recaptured and Ondra fell into hands of the Mir of Hunza. Qutlug Baig was buried in Gulmit along with his courtesans. According to Afzal Khan, one of the notables of Gulmit, the grave of Qutlug was located where there is now the Government Girls High School in Gulmit. Qutllug ruled over Gulmit and its adjoining areas for twelve years. During his rule, land and life was safe and secure. He pushed the advancing Kirghiz back to their land and never let them succeed in their mission and goals. The heroic stories of Qulug still dominate the daily discourse of the Wakhi people living in Gulmit, Shimshal, Chipursan, the valleys of Gojal. Many storytellers still amuse both audience and themselves by narrating the stories of their ruler Qutlug Baig. This fort is still a destination for domestic and international tourists. From Ondra fort one has a panoramic view of Gulmit. From the south one can see Gulmit and as far as Shishkat villages and from the north one can view the Ghulkin village. From the north one can enjoy seeing Gulmit tower. Ghulkin glacier, Tupopdan and Qaroon peak. From the west, there are views of Gulmit Glacier, Gulmit Tower, Shisper Peak and Utlar Sar.

== Population ==
The population of Gulmit, according to 2016 survey, consists of around 5000 individuals. Fifty-one percent of the population is female.

== Climate ==
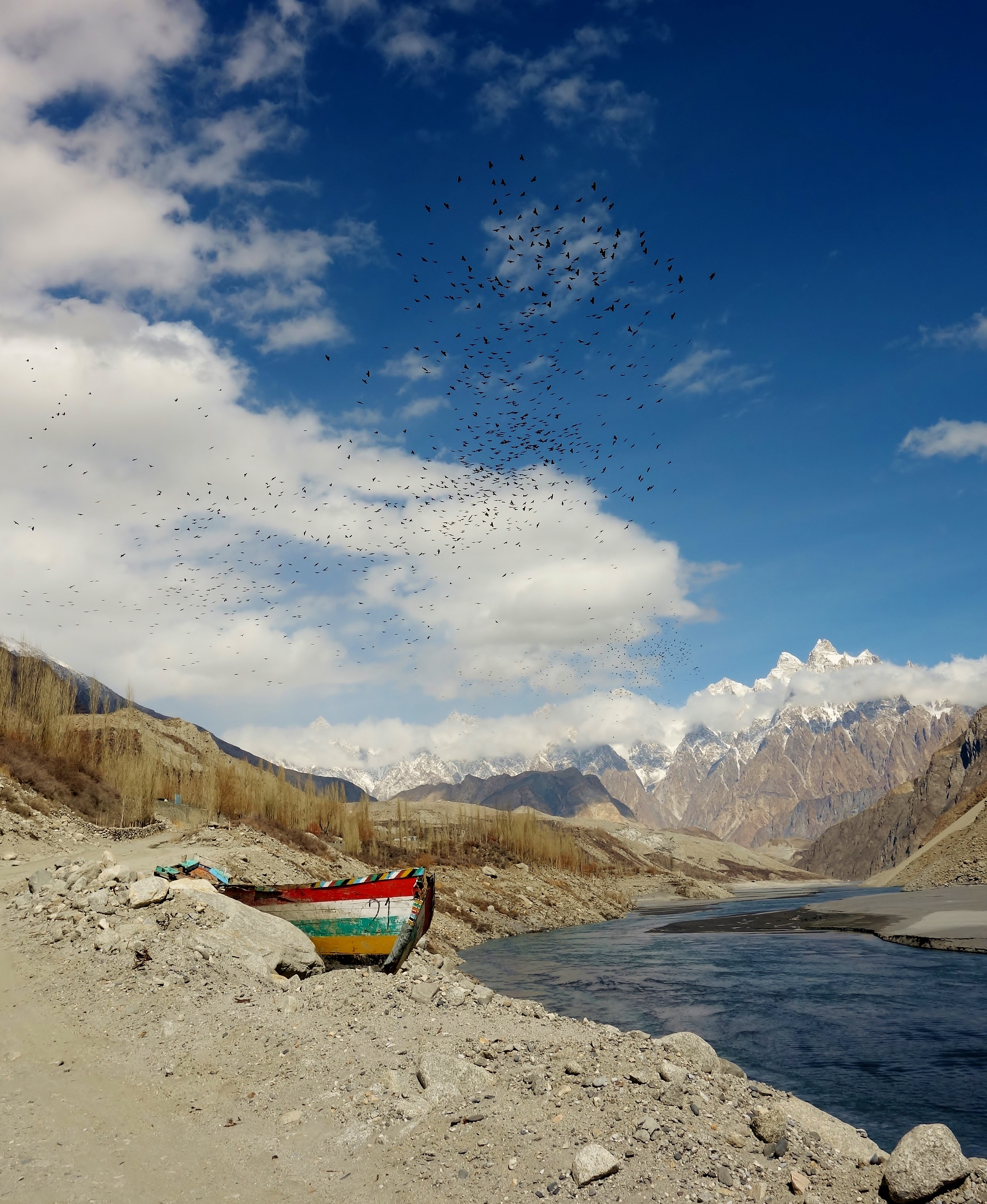
Retreating Attabad lake at Gulmit

With virtually no rainfall during the year, Gulmit features a cool arid climate (Köppen BWk). The average temperature in summer is 18 to 24 °C or 64.4 to 75.2 °F, while the annual precipitation averages 113 millimetres or 4.4 inches. November is the driest month with 2 millimetres or 0.079 inches of rainfall, while May, the wettest month, has an average precipitation of 24 millimetres or 0.94 inches.

July is the warmest month of the year with an average temperature of 21.8 °C or 71.2 °F. The coldest month January has an average temperature of −5.5 °C or 22.1 °F.

Climate data for Gulmit
Month	Jan	Feb	Mar	Apr	May	Jun	Jul	Aug	Sep	Oct	Nov	Dec	Year
Mean daily maximum °C (°F)	−1.0 (30.2)	1.5 (34.7)	7.6 (45.7)	14.7 (58.5)	19.9 (67.8)	25.4 (77.7)	28.5 (83.3)	28.0 (82.4)	23.0 (73.4)	16.3 (61.3)	9.1 (48.4)	1.9 (35.4)	14.6 (58.2)
Daily mean °C (°F)	−5.5 (22.1)	−3.2 (26.2)	2.9 (37.2)	9.4 (48.9)	13.9 (57.0)	18.8 (65.8)	21.8 (71.2)	21.5 (70.7)	16.6 (61.9)	10.0 (50.0)	3.5 (38.3)	−2.5 (27.5)	8.9 (48.1)
Mean daily minimum °C (°F)	−10.0 (14.0)	−7.9 (17.8)	−1.7 (28.9)	4.1 (39.4)	7.9 (46.2)	12.3 (54.1)	15.2 (59.4)	15.1 (59.2)	10.2 (50.4)	3.8 (38.8)	−2.1 (28.2)	−6.8 (19.8)	3.3 (38.0)
Average precipitation mm (inches)	7 (0.3)	8 (0.3)	16 (0.6)	18 (0.7)	24 (0.9)	5 (0.2)	8 (0.3)	9 (0.4)	7 (0.3)	5 (0.2)	2 (0.1)	4 (0.2)	113 (4.5)
Source: Climate-Data.org

== Buildings ==
There are five Jamaat-khanas or religious community centres in Gulmit, one in every ward of the village. The old summer palace of the Mir of Hunza stands at the northern edge of Gulmit's historic polo ground. Old places of worship, now used as libraries, also adorn Gulmit valley.

New buildings constructed by the government in Gulmit include the tehsil headquarters, the federal government's boys' high school, civil hospital, Diamond Jubilee girls middle school and government girls' higher secondary school.

Al-Amyn model school, a community-based organization, has a building with a hostel facility next to the health center of Aga Khan Health Services.

Ondra poygah is a staircase the community has built staircase to the top of Ondra hill. Poygah is "staircase" in Wakhi. It is composed of 1,600+ stairs and is the longest staircase in Pakistan. At the top of the hill is the historic fort Ondra Fort. The community worked on this staircase for 2–3 months, from December to February. At the top is a path to Odver then to Kumaris.

== Notable people ==
- Nazir Ahmad Bulbul: A poet of Wakhi language, Bulbul, was born and lives in Gulmit.

== Mountains ==
Gulmit is surrounded by mountains on all sides. To the extreme north is Tupopdan, while on the south is Ghawush. Standing tall in the east is Mount Pulpul, and in the west is Gulmit Tower, right above the Shutubar Glacier. Gulmit Tower, a vertical monolith, is yet to be climbed.

== Village organizations ==
There are as many as 26 organizations working in and for the village out of which the top three in the below list are registered with Government. Most of these organizations work under the umbrella of Gulmit Organization for Local Development (GOLD). Some of the larger organizations, member-wise and activities-wise are the following:

- Gulmit Educational and Social Welfare Society (GESW)
- Gulmit Organization for Local Development (GOLD)
- Gulmit Young Stars Club & Students Welfare Organization - GYSC
- Counselling and Management Body Gulmit (CMBG)
- Gulmit Arts Council
- Gulmit Natural Resources Conservation Group
- Rituals Committee
- Bulbulik

Apart from these social organizations there are other Ismaili organizations, working under the banner of the Shia Immami Ismaila Council for Gulmit. These Ismaili organizations cater services to the entire Gojal Valley but Gulmit, being the headquarters, hosts their offices.

== See also ==
- Batbaykor
