= Kha with caron =

Cyrillic letter used for /x/ in Shughni and Wakhi

- Х̌ х̌

Usage
- Writing system: Cyrillic
- Type: Alphabetic
- Sound values: /x/

Kha with caron (Х̌ х̌ italics: Х̌ х̌) is a letter of the Cyrillic script. It is used in the Shughni and Wakhi languages, where it represents the voiceless velar fricative /x/, like the Scottish ⟨ch⟩ in "loch". In Shughni, it can be substituted for the digraph хь, and corresponds to the Latin letters Ẋ or X̌.

== See also ==
- Cyrillic script in Unicode
