= The (Cyrillic) =

Cyrillic letter used in three languages

Es with descender
- Ҫ ҫ

Usage
- Writing system: Cyrillic
- Type: Alphabetic
- Sound values: [θ], [ɕ]

History
- Transliterations: Th th

The or Es with Descender (Ҫ ҫ; italics: Ҫ ҫ) is a letter of the Cyrillic script. The name the is pronounced [θɛ], like the pronunciation of ⟨the⟩ in "theft". In Unicode, this letter is called "Es with descender". In Chuvash, it looks identical to the Latin letter C with cedilla (Ç ç Ç ç). Occasionally, it also has the hook diacritic curved rightward like an ogonek, as in the Scalable Vector Graphics image shown in the sidebar. In many fonts, the character hooks to the left.

The is used in the alphabets of the Bashkir, Chuvash, and Enets.

- In Bashkir, it represents the voiceless dental fricative /θ/ (th as in thin).
- In Chuvash, it represents the voiceless alveolo-palatal fricative /ɕ/ (somewhat like sh as in ship), and becomes lenis /ɕ̬/ when between vowels.
- In Enets, it represents the voiceless alveolo-palatal fricative /ɕ/ (pronunciation above).

It is usually romanized as 'ś', 'ş', 'θ' or 'þ'.

== Computing codes ==
Character information
| Preview | Ҫ | | ҫ | |
|---|---|---|---|---|
| Unicode name | CYRILLIC CAPITAL LETTER; ES WITH DESCENDER | | CYRILLIC SMALL LETTER; ES WITH DESCENDER | |
| Encodings | decimal | hex | dec | hex |
| Unicode | 1194 | U+04AA | 1195 | U+04AB |
| UTF-8 | 210 170 | D2 AA | 210 171 | D2 AB |
| Numeric character reference | &#1194; | &#x4AA; | &#1195; | &#x4AB; |

== See also ==
- С с : Cyrillic letter Es
- Ѳ ѳ : Cyrillic letter Fita, pronounced in Russian as "Ф" [f], which replaced it in the 1918 alphabet reform, and derived from the Greek letter theta, classically pronounced as a voiceless dental fricative [θ], but sounding like [f] in Byzantine Greek, which influenced East Slavic languages the most
- Т̌ т̌ : Cyrillic letter te with caron, pronounced in Wakhi Cyrillic as a voiceless dental fricative (/θ/)
- С̈ с̈ : Cyrillic letter Es with diaresis, replaced by this letter
- Cyrillic characters in Unicode
