= We (Cyrillic) =

Cyrillic letter in Kurdish, Yaghnobi and Tundra Yukaghir

- Ԝ ԝ

Usage
- Writing system: Cyrillic
- Type: Alphabetic
- Sound values: [w], [ʋ], [β̞], [β], [u̯]

History
- Development: W w: V; Ԝ ԝ
- Sisters: W

We (Ԝ ԝ; italics: Ԝ ԝ) is a letter of the Cyrillic script. It looks identical to the Latin letter W, where it derives from.

The letter is used in the Cyrillic orthography of the Kurdish language, Yaghnobi language, and occasionally the Tundra Yukaghir language.

== Usage ==
The pronunciations shown in the table are the primary ones for each language; for details consult the articles on the languages. Lowercase We is similar to some forms of Cyrillic Omega in appearance.

Language	Pronunciation
Kurdish language	/w/
Tundra Yukaghir language	/w/
Yaghnobi language	/β̞/, /β/ or /u̯/ (after a vowel at the end of a syllable)

== Computing codes ==
Character information
Preview	Ԝ		ԝ	
Unicode name	CYRILLIC CAPITAL LETTER WE		CYRILLIC SMALL LETTER WE	
Encodings	decimal	hex	dec	hex
Unicode	1308	U+051C	1309	U+051D
UTF-8	212 156	D4 9C	212 157	D4 9D
Numeric character reference	&#1308;	&#x51C;	&#1309;	&#x51D;

== See also ==
- Cyrillic characters in Unicode
- Ѡ ѡ : Cyrillic letter Omega, a similar-looking letter in archaic Cyrillic texts for /o/
- W w : Latin letter W
- Ў ў : Cyrillic letter Short U, another letter romanized as "W"
- В̌ в̌ : Cyrillic letter Ve with caron
