= Nazir Ahmad Bulbul =

Wakhi language poet and an educationist (born 1966)

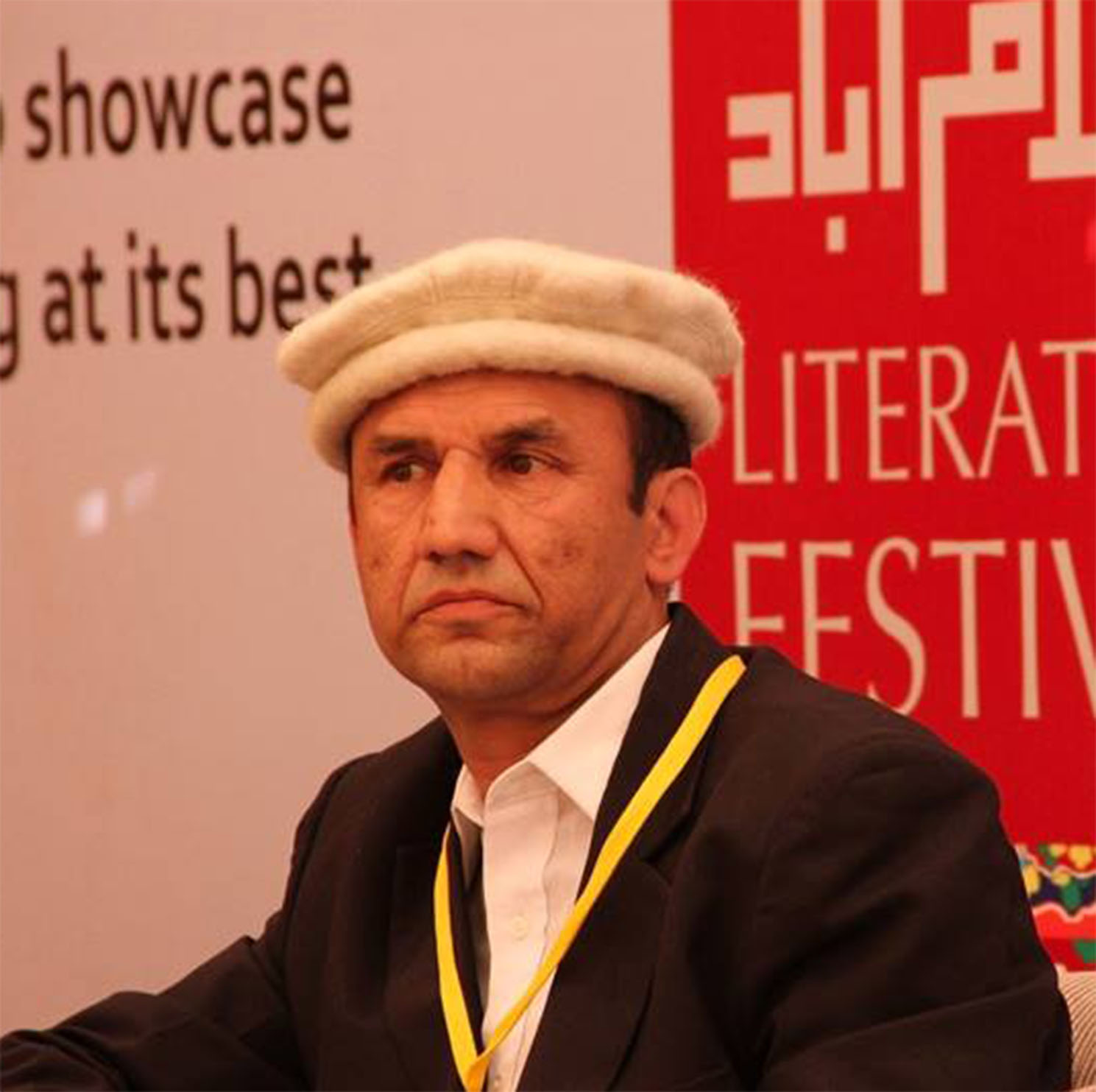
Nazir Ahmad Bulbul during the Islamabad Literature Festival (2014)

Nazir Ahmad Bulbul (Wakhi: نذیر احمد بلبل) is a Wakhi language poet and an educator. He was born in Gulmit, a village located in the Gojal Tehsil of District Hunza, in the Gilgit-Baltistan region, Pakistan.

== Life, career, and education ==
He was born in Gulmit in 1966. He is married and lives with his wife, son and daughter.

He has studied at the University of Karachi and the Aga Khan University, Karachi, getting degrees in political science, education and leadership. He is the first indigenous Wakhi writer from Pakistan whose poetry has been published in the form of a book. He also writes in Urdu.

Currently, he is serving as the Principal of the Al-Amyn Model Higher Secondary School, located in Gulmit. He has worked for Mountain Institute of Educational Development (MIED), as a teacher trainer. He has also served at Nasir-e-Khusraw Model Academy, Ghulkin, as Principal in the past.

== Poetry ==
Bulbul's poetry covers almost all areas of human experiences. He has written religious poems, praising God, the teachings and personalities of the prophet Muhammad, and the Imamah, revered by the followers of the Shia Ismaili school of thought. He has also extensively written about human relations, love, separation, pain and suffering.

One of the most important parts of Bulbul's work is satirical, which he uses to question the standards of the society, the common practices, and the loss of values and cultural traits, which he discourages.

Bulbul has also evoked a sense of pride among the Wakhi-speaking people, by asking them to be proud of who their ancestors were, and who they are.

Bulbul was among of the poets invited to speak and share their work at the 2014 Islamabad Literature Festival. Two other poets from the Gilgit-Baltistan region had also been invited. Nazir shared his Wakhi and Urdu work during a session.

=== Biyoz-e-Bulbul ===
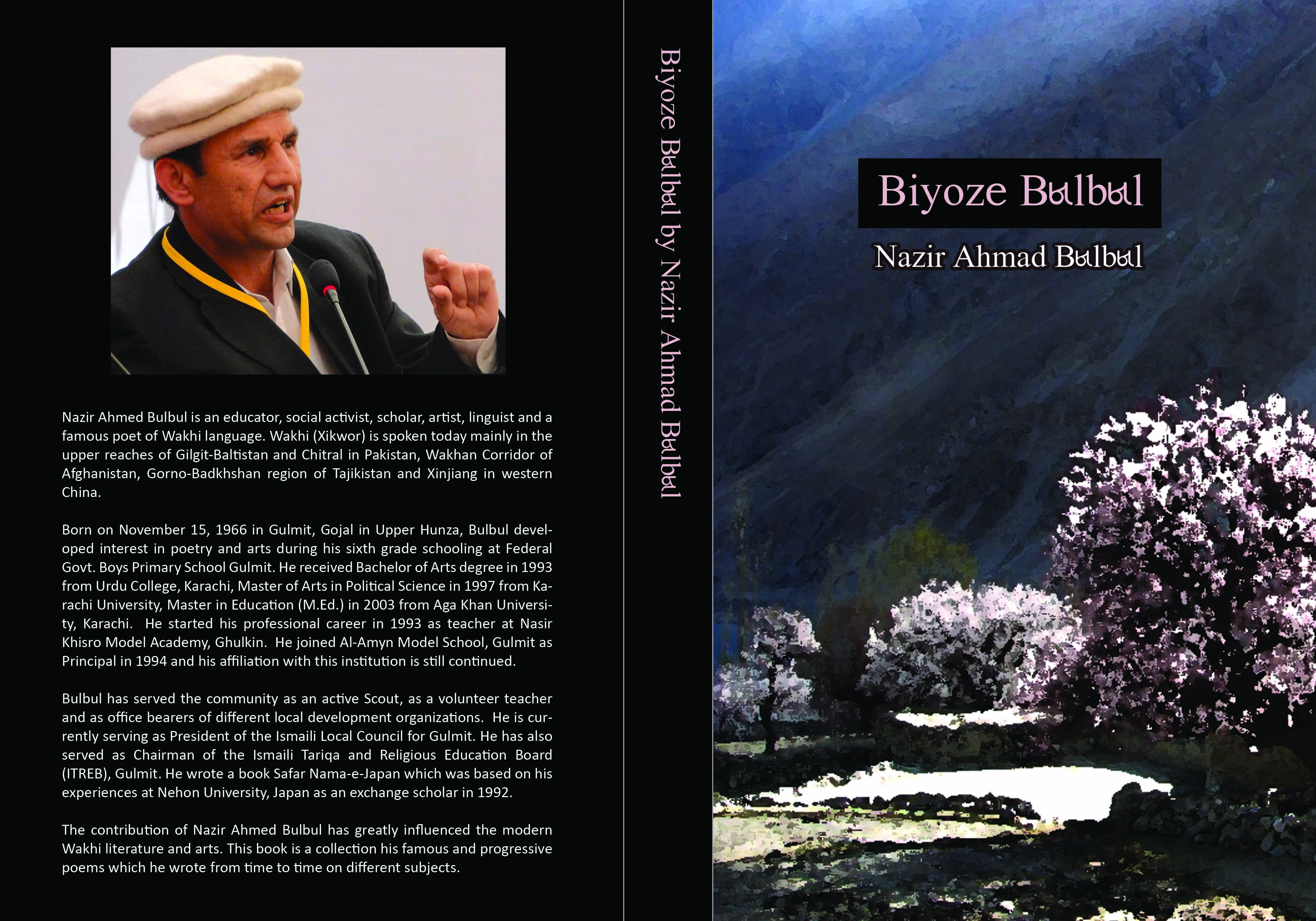
Front and Back Cover of Biyoz-e-Bulbul, the first book of Wakhi poetry

His Wakhi poetry has been published in the form of a book titled Biyoz-e-Bulbul.

The book launch was attended by hundreds of people, including regional notables.

== Prose ==
Bulbul has written an Urdu travelogue, based on his trip to Japan. The travelogue is in Urdu and remains unpublished.

== Research ==
While working at the Mountain Institute of Educational Developed, and during his education at the Aga Khan University, Bulbul has written many research papers and case studies. These, among others, include:

- Teachers as researchers.
- Facilitating teacher's understanding and practice of constructivist notion of teaching and learning: A focus on soliciting students prior knowledge.

== Painting ==
Bulbul has used his painting and sketching skills to depict human emotions, the Wakhi way of life, economic depravity, lack of equal opportunities, cultural degradation and other themes. His painting and sketching skills are natural. He has not learnt these skills at a college.
