= Ge with stroke and caron =

Cyrillic letter used in Shughni

- Ғ̌ ғ̌

Usage
- Writing system: Cyrillic
- Type: Alphabetic
- Language of origin: Shughni language, Yazghulami language
- Sound values: /ʁ/

Ge with stroke and caron (Ғ̌ ғ̌ italics: Ғ̌ ғ̌) is a letter of the Cyrillic script. It is used in the Shughni language and Yazghulami language, where it represents the voiced uvular fricative /ʁ/ (like the French r in rouge).

It is related to, but not the same as, a normal Ge (Г).

== See also ==
- Ge with caron
