= Batbaykor =

Human settlement in Pakistan

Batbaykor is a small hamlet in Gulmit, Gojal in Gilgit-Baltistan, Pakistan.
