= Combining Half Marks =

- Range: U+FE20..U+FE2F (16 code points)
- Plane: BMP
- Scripts: Cyrillic (2 char.); Inherited (14 char.)
- Symbol sets: Half diacritics
- Assigned: 16 code points
- Unused: 0 reserved code points

Unicode version history
- 1.1 (1993): 4 (+4)
- 5.1 (2008): 7 (+3)
- 7.0 (2014): 14 (+7)
- 8.0 (2015): 16 (+2)

Unicode documentation
- Code chart ∣ Web page

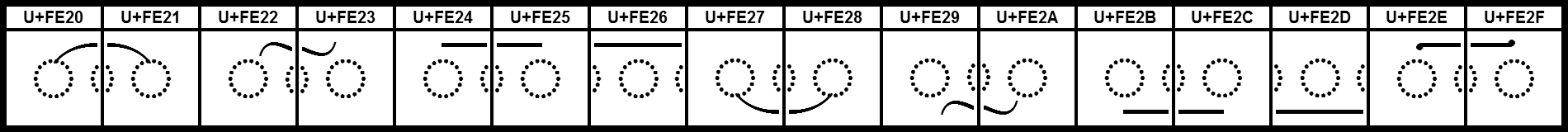
Graphical representation of the Combining Half Marks Unicode block. Hatched boxes indicate non-assigned code points.

Combining Half Marks is a Unicode block containing diacritical combining characters for spanning multiple characters.

== Block ==
Combining Half Marks^{[1]} Official Unicode Consortium code chart (PDF)
	0	1	2	3	4	5	6	7	8	9	A	B	C	D	E	F
U+FE2x	◌︠	◌︡	◌︢	◌︣	◌︤	◌︥	◌︦	◌︧	◌︨	◌︩	◌︪	◌︫	◌︬	◌︭	◌︮	◌︯
Notes: 1. As of Unicode version 17.0

== History ==
The following Unicode-related documents record the purpose and process of defining specific characters in the Combining Half Marks block:

Version	Final code points (Note: Proposed code points and characters names may differ from final code points and names)	Count	L2 ID	WG2 ID	Document
1.1	U+FE20..FE23	4			(to be determined)
5.1	U+FE24..FE26	3	L2/07-085R	N3222R	Everson, Michael; Emmel, Stephen; Marjanen, Antti; Dunderberg, Ismo; Baines, John; Pedro, Susana; Emiliano, António (2007-03-15), Proposal to add additional characters for Coptic and Latin in the UCS
5.1	U+FE24..FE26	3	L2/07-150		Whistler, Ken (2007-05-10), "G", WG2 Consent Docket
5.1	U+FE24..FE26	3	L2/07-118R2		Moore, Lisa (2007-05-23), "111-C17", UTC #111 Minutes
5.1	U+FE24..FE26	3	L2/07-268	N3253 (pdf, doc)	Umamaheswaran, V. S. (2007-07-26), "M50.22", Unconfirmed minutes of WG 2 meeting 50, Frankfurt-am-Main, Germany; 2007-04-24/27
7.0	U+FE27..FE2D	7	L2/08-392		Pentzlin, Karl (2008-10-25), Proposal to encode a combining diacritical mark for Low German dialect writing
7.0	U+FE27..FE2D	7	L2/09-028	N3571	Ruppel, Klaas; Aalto, Tero; Everson, Michael (2009-01-27), Proposal to encode additional characters for the Uralic Phonetic Alphabet
7.0	U+FE27..FE2D	7	L2/09-281		Anderson, Deborah (2009-08-06), COMBINING TRIPLE INVERTED BREVE and other triple-length combining marks
7.0	U+FE27..FE2D	7	L2/09-225R		Moore, Lisa (2009-08-17), "C.14", UTC #120 / L2 #217 Minutes
7.0	U+FE27..FE2D	7	L2/10-353	N3915	Pentzlin, Karl (2010-09-23), Preliminary Proposal to enable the use of Combining Triple Diacritics in Plain Text
7.0	U+FE27..FE2D	7	L2/10-416R		Moore, Lisa (2010-11-09), "C.4", UTC #125 / L2 #222 Minutes
7.0	U+FE27..FE2D	7		N3903 (pdf, doc)	"10.25", Unconfirmed minutes of WG2 meeting 57, 2011-03-31
7.0	U+FE27..FE2D	7	L2/11-224	N4078	Proposal to enable the use of Combining Triple Diacritics in Plain Text, 2011-05-22
7.0	U+FE27..FE2D	7	L2/11-261R2		Moore, Lisa (2011-08-16), "Consensus 128-C34", UTC #128 / L2 #225 Minutes
7.0	U+FE27..FE2D	7	L2/11-296R	N4131	Everson, Michael (2011-10-28), Proposal for encoding the Caucasian Albanian script in the SMP of the UCS
7.0	U+FE27..FE2D	7		N4103	"11.15 Combining Triple Diacritics in plain text", Unconfirmed minutes of WG 2 meeting 58, 2012-01-03
7.0	U+FE27..FE2D	7		N4243	Everson, Michael; Gippert, Jost (2012-02-14), Documentation for Two Characters FE2B and FE2C for Caucasian Albanian (N4131R)
7.0	U+FE27..FE2D	7	L2/12-112		Moore, Lisa (2012-05-17), "131-C22", UTC #131 / L2 #228 Minutes
7.0	U+FE27..FE2D	7		N4253 (pdf, doc)	"M59.01e", Unconfirmed minutes of WG 2 meeting 59, 2012-09-12
8.0	U+FE2E..FE2F	2	L2/13-164		Cleminson, Ralph; Birnbaum, David (2013-07-25), Feedback from Experts on Cyrillic proposals
8.0	U+FE2E..FE2F	2	L2/13-165		Anderson, Deborah; Whistler, Ken; Pournader, Roozbeh (2013-07-25), "4", Recommendations to UTC on Script Proposals
8.0	U+FE2E..FE2F	2	L2/13-132		Moore, Lisa (2013-07-29), "Consensus 136-C23", UTC #136 Minutes
8.0	U+FE2E..FE2F	2	L2/13-139	N4475	Andreev, Aleksandr; Shardt, Yuri; Simmons, Nikita (2013-08-07), Proposal to Encode Combining Half Marks Used for Cyrillic Supralineation in Unicode
8.0	U+FE2E..FE2F	2		N4553 (pdf, doc)	Umamaheswaran, V. S. (2014-09-16), "M62.04a", Minutes of WG 2 meeting 62 Adobe, San Jose, CA, USA

== See also ==
- Combining character
- Cyrillic script in Unicode
