= Che with dot below =

Cyrillic letter

- Ч̣ ч̣

Usage
- Writing system: Cyrillic
- Type: Alphabetic
- Sound values: /ʈ͡ʂ/

Che with dot below (Ч̣ ч̣; italics: Ч̣ ч̣) is a letter of the Cyrillic script.

It is only used in the Wakhi language where it represents the voiceless retroflex affricate /ʈ͡ʂ/.

It corresponds to the letter Č̣ in Latin script.

== See also ==
- Ч ч: Cyrillic letter Che
