= Ve with caron =

Cyrillic letter used for /w/ in Shughni and Wakhi

- В̌ в̌
- В̆ в̆

Usage
- Writing system: Cyrillic
- Type: Alphabetic
- Sound values: /w/

History
Development
O1
        - Β β
          - В в
            - В̌ в̌
- Variations: В̆ в̆

Ve with caron (В̌ в̌; italics: В̌ в̌) is a letter of the Cyrillic script.

It is used in the Shughni and Wakhi languages , where it represents the voiced labial–velar approximant /w/, like the pronunciation of ⟨w⟩ in "wait".

== Related letters and other similar characters ==
- Ԝ ԝ: Cyrillic letter We
- W w: Latin letter W
- Ў ў: Cyrillic letter Short U

== Computing codes ==
Being a relatively recent letter, not present in any legacy 8-bit Cyrillic encoding, the letter В̌ is not represented directly by a precomposed character in Unicode either; it has to be composed as В+caron.

Character information
Preview	В		в		̌	
Unicode name	CYRILLIC CAPITAL LETTER VE		CYRILLIC SMALL LETTER VE		COMBINING CARON	
Encodings	decimal	hex	dec	hex	dec	hex
Unicode	1042	U+0412	1074	U+0432	780	U+030C
UTF-8	208 146	D0 92	208 178	D0 B2	204 140	CC 8C
Numeric character reference	&#1042;	&#x412;	&#1074;	&#x432;	&#780;	&#x30C;
Named character reference	&Vcy;		&vcy;			

== See also ==
- Cyrillic script in Unicode
