= Wakhi language =

Eastern Iranian language spoken by the Wakhi people

Wakhi
- ښیکوار; Х̆икв̆ор; X̌ikwor
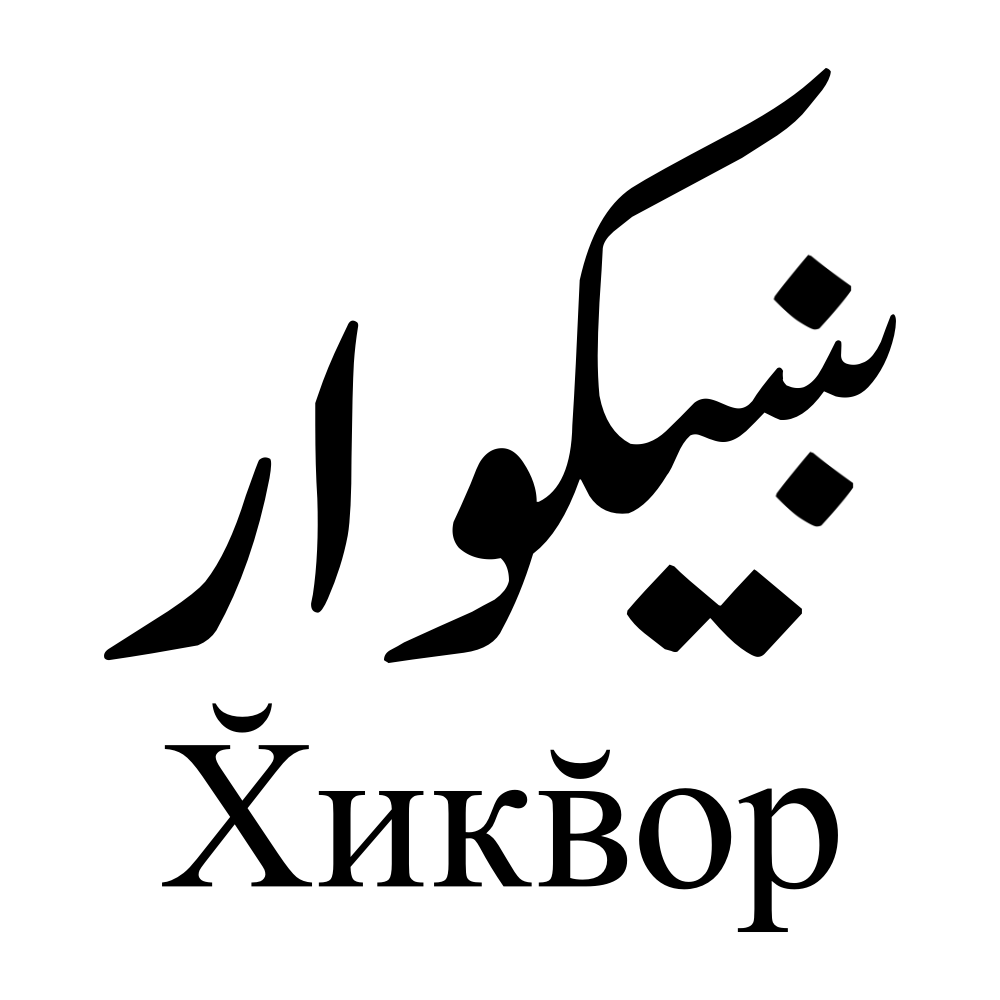
- Wakhi written in Arabic script in Nastaliq style and in Cyrillic script
- Native to: Afghanistan, China, Pakistan, Tajikistan
- Ethnicity: Wakhi
- Native speakers: (58,000 cited 1992–2012)
- Language family: Indo-European: Indo-Iranian; Iranian; Eastern; Scythian; Saka–Wakhi; Wakhi
- Writing system: Arabic, Cyrillic, Latin

Official status
- Recognised minority language in: Tajikistan (in Gorno-Badakhshan)

Language codes
- ISO 639-3: wbl
- Glottolog: wakh1245
- ELP: Wakhi
- Linguasphere: 58-ABD-c
- Wakhi is classified as Definitely Endangered by the UNESCO Atlas of the World's Languages in Danger

Wakhi (ښیکوار, Х̆икв̆ор, romanized: X̌ikwor, pronounced [xikwɔr]) is an Eastern Iranic language within the Indo-Iranian branch of the Indo-European language family, spoken primarily by the Wakhi people native to the Wakhan region in Afghanistan and Tajikistan, as well as neighboring areas of Pakistan and China.

== Classification and distribution ==
Wakhi is one of several languages that belong to the areal Pamir language group. It is believed to be a descendant of the Eastern Iranian Scytho-Khotanese language once spoken in the Eastern Iranian Kingdom of Khotan. The Wakhi use the self-appellation 'X̌ik' (ethnic) and suffix it with 'wor'/'war' to denote their language as 'X̌ik-wor' themselves. The noun 'X̌ik' comes from *waxša-ī̆ka- (an inhabitant of *Waxša- 'Oxus', for Wakhan, in Wakhi 'Wux̌.' There are other equivalents for the name Wakhi (Anglicised) or Wakhani (Persian), Vakhantsy (Russian), Gojali/Gojo (Dingrik-wor/Shina), Guyits/Guicho (Burushaski), Wakhigi/Wakhik-war (Kivi-wor/Khow-wor) and Cert (Turkish).

The Wakhi people are occasionally called Pamiris and Guhjali. The Wakhi language is spoken by the inhabitants of the Wakhan Corridor in Afghanistan, parts of Gilgit-Baltistan and Chitral in Pakistan, the Gorno-Badakhshan region in Tajikistan, and the Taxkorgan Tajik Autonomous County of Xinjiang in Western China.

=== In Afghanistan ===
In the Wakhan Corridor of Afghanistan, Wakhi is spoken from Fotur, near Ishkashim, to the upper reaches of the Wakhan River.

=== In Tajikistan ===
In Tajikistan, the Wakhi and other communities that speak one of the Pamir languages refer to themselves as Pamiri or Badakhshani, and there has been a movement to separate their identity from that of the majority of Persian-speaking Tajiks. Linguists universally refer to Wakhi as an East Iranian language independent of Tajik Persian, but many Tajik nationalists insist that Wakhi and other Pamir languages are dialects of Tajik Persian.

=== In Pakistan ===
In Gilgit-Baltistan, Wakhi is spoken in the sparsely populated upper portions of five of the northernmost valleys: Gojal, Ishkoman, Yasin, Gupis, and Yarkhun. The Hunza Valley has the largest Wakhi population in Pakistan. The Wakhis of Ishkoman live primarily in the Karambar Valley, the town of Imit, and beyond. In Yasin, they live mainly in the vicinity of Darkot, and in Yarhkun, they are found in Baroghil and a few other small villages in the high, upper portion of the valley.

In Pakistan, the central organization of the Wakhi is the Wakhi Cultural Association Pakistan (WCA). This organization is registered with the Government of Pakistan and collaborates with the Ministry of Culture and Tourism and Lok Virsa Pakistan. The Association is working to preserve the Wakhi language and culture and document their poetry and music.

Radio Pakistan, Gilgit relays the Wakhi radio programme "Sadoyah Boomy Dunyo", the "Voice of the Roof of the World." The Wakhi Cultural Association has arranged more than twenty programmes since 1984, which include cultural shows, musical nights, and large-scale musical festivals with the collaboration of Lok Virsa Pakistan, the Aga Khan Cultural Service Pakistan (AKCSP), and Pakistan television. In 2000, the WCA won a "Best Programme" organizer award in the Silk Road Festival from the President of Pakistan, Pervez Musharraf. A computerized codification of the Pakistani version of the Wakhi script has been released, which will help to promote the language development program and documentation of Wakhi poetry, literature, and history.

=== In China ===
Wakhi is also spoken in the Taxkorgan Tajik Autonomous County, in the Xinjiang province of China, mainly in the township of Dafdar.

=== In Russia ===
There are approximately 21,000 Wakhi in Russia, Most of them have migrated from Tajikistan and Afghanistan.

=== In Turkey ===
There are some Wakhi villages in Turkey in the eastern regions, where they have migrated from Afghanistan in 1979 during the Soviet-Afghan war.

== Phonology ==
=== Vowels ===
	Front	Central	Back
Close	i	ɨ	u
Mid	e	ə	o
Open	a		

=== Consonants ===
	Labial	Dental	Alveolar	Alveolo- palatal	Retroflex	Velar	Uvular	Glottal
Nasal	m	n						
Plosive	p b	t̪ d̪			ʈ ɖ	k ɡ	q	
Affricate			t͡s d͡z	t͡ʃ d͡ʒ	ʈ͡ʂ ɖ͡ʐ			
Fricative	f v	θ ð	s z	ʃ ʒ	ʂ ʐ	x ɣ	χ ʁ	h
Approximant		l		j		w		
Rhotic		r						

== Orthography ==
Traditionally, Wakhi was not a written language. Wakhi people live in four countries, Afghanistan, Tajikistan, Pakistan, and China, and are in contact with speakers of various other languages. Writing systems have been developed for the language using Arabic, Cyrillic, and Latin scripts, each with inspirations from neighboring languages and orthographic conventions. However, due to the pluricentric nature of Wakhi dialects, marginalization in favour of a more significant national/regional language, remoteness, and political instability, no one orthographic standard has managed to rise to the level of a singular unifying writing system.

=== Arabic script ===
The Arabic-script Wakhi alphabet derives from the Persian alphabet used in Afghanistan. However, there are sounds in Wakhi that are not found in Persian. Here, two diverging conventions have emerged, one in Afghanistan and another in Pakistan. Pashto alphabet has inspired letters in Afghanistan to represent missing sounds in Wakhi, especially the various retroflex sounds missing in Persian. Urdu and orthographies of other languages of Gilgit-Baltistan have been the inspiration for the orthography of Wakhi in Pakistan.

==== Afghan alphabet ====
The table below shows the Afghan Wakhi alphabet. It derives from the alphabet of Dari Persian, one of Afghanistan's two official languages. The Pashto alphabet, from the other official language of Afghanistan, is the source of several letters for phonemes that don't exist in Persian. This orthographic standard has similarities to the orthographies of other Pamir languages, such as Shughni and Munji.

Wakhi letters (Afghanistan)
Wakhi (Latin) [IPA]	ا^{1} ‌ - (A a/E e/I i/U u) [∅]([a][u][e][i])	آ / ـا^{2} (A a) [ɔ]	ب (B b) [b]	پ (P p) [p]	ت (T t) [t̪]	ټ (Ṭ ṭ) [ʈ]
Wakhi (Latin) [IPA]	ث^{3} (S s) [s]	ٿ^{3} (Θ ϑ) [θ]	ج (J̌ ǰ) [d͡ʒ]	ڃ (J̣̌ ǰ̣) [ɖ͡ʐ]	چ (Č č) [t͡ʃ]	ڇ (Č̣ č̣) [ʈ͡ʂ]
Wakhi (Latin) [IPA]	ح (H h) [h]	خ (X x) [χ]	ځ (Ʒ ʒ) [d͡z]	څ (C c) [t͡s]	د (D d) [d̪]	ډ (Ḍ ḍ) [ɖ]
Wakhi (Latin) [IPA]	ذ^{4} (Z z) [z]	ڎ^{4} (Δ δ) [ð]	ر (R r) [r]	ز (Z z) [z]	ژ (Ž ž) [ʒ]	ڙ (Ẓ̌ ẓ̌) [ʐ]
Wakhi (Latin) [IPA]	ږ (Ɣ̌ ɣ̌) [ɣ]	س (S s) [s]	ش (Š š) [ʃ]	ڜ (Ṣ̌ ṣ̌) [ʂ]	ښ (X̌ x̌) [x]	ص (S s) [s]
Wakhi (Latin) [IPA]	ض (Z z) [z]	ط (T t) [t̪]	ظ (Z z) [z]	ع ( - ) [∅]/[ʔ]	غ (Ɣ γ) [ʁ]	ف (F f) [f]
Wakhi (Latin) [IPA]	ڤ (V v) [v]	ق (Q q) [q]	ک (K k) [k]	گ (G g) [ɡ]	ل (L l) [l]	م (M m) [m]
Wakhi (Latin) [IPA]	ن (N n) [n]	او / و^{5} (W w) [u][w]	ؤ^{6} (Ы ы) [ɨ]	هـ / ه^{7} (H h/ - a) [h][a]	ایـ / یـ / ی^{8,9} (E e/I i/Y y) [e][i][j]	ي^{9} (- i) [i]

Notes:

1. Letter alef at the beginning of a word can serve two functions. First, it precedes vowel letters "ایـ" [e] and [i], or "او" [u]. Second, it acts as a vowel carrier for diacritics of the vowel, "اَ" [a].
2. Vowel phoneme [ɔ] is represented with "آ" when at the beginning of a word, and with "ـا / ا" when in the middle or end of a word.
3. While the letter se "ث" represents the phoneme [θ], this letter in loanwords that have entered Dari Persian have come to be pronounced as [s]. Due to consistent contact with Dari, those loanwords have entered Wakhi with their Dari pronunciations. Unlike Dari, Wakhi does have a separate phoneme [θ]. Some sources use the letter se "ث", whereas others use a new letter, te with 4 dots "ٿ" that has been introduced so that there can be distinguishment between the native sound [θ] and the sound [s] produced by the letter se "ث" in loanwords.
4. While the letter zal "ذ" represents the phoneme [ð], this letter in loanwords in Dari have come to be pronounced [z]. Due to consistent contact with Dari, those loanwords have entered Wakhi with their Dari pronunciations. Unlike Dari, Wakhi does have a separate phoneme [ð]. Some sources use the letter zal "ذ", whereas others use a new letter, dal with 3 dots "ڎ" that has been introduced so that there can be distinguishment between the native sound [ð] and the sound [z] produced by the letter zal "ذ" in loanwords.
5. Represents two phonemes based on context, [w] and [u]. If used at the beginning of a word, if representing consonant [w], it will be written standalone "و", if representing a vowel [u], it will be preceded by alef "او".
6. Represents a vowel phoneme. But even if at the beginning of a word, it is written standalone, and without a preceding alef; "ؤ".
7. At the end of a word, the letter he "ـه ه" can either represent a consonant sound [h] or a vowel sound [a] depending on context.
8. The letter ye represents three phonemes based on context, [e], [i] and [j]. If used at the beginning of a word, if representing consonant [j], it will be written standalone "یـ", if representing a vowel [e] or a vowel [i], it will be preceded by alef "ایـ".
9. There are two types of final ye. in At the end of a word, if representing the consonant [j], the dotless final ye "ی" is used. If representing the vowel [i], the double dot final ye "ي" is used.

Wakhi vowels (Afghanistan)
A a	O o	E e	I i	Ə ə	U u	Ы ы
[a]	[ɔ]	[e]	[i]	[ə]	[u]	[ɨ]
Vowels at the beginning of a word
اَ / ا	آ	-	ایـ	-	او	ؤ
Vowels at the middle of a word
◌َ	ا / ـا	◌ِ / یـ / ـیـ		-	و / ـو	ؤ / ـؤ
Vowels at the end of a word
ه / ـه	ا / ـا	ی / ـی	ي / ـي	ی / ـی	و / ـو	ؤ / ـؤ

==== Pakistani alphabet ====
The below table is the Pakistani alphabet for the Wakhi language. This alphabet also derives from the Dari alphabet. However, Urdu, Pakistan's national language, is the source of letters for phonemes that do not exist in Dari. The vowels reflect Urdu pronunciation. For example, the phoneme [ɔ], which is equivalent to Iranian Persian [ɒː] after having undergone a chain shift, is not written with alef "آ / ا /ا ـا" but with the letter waw "او / و / ـو".

Stylistically, while in Afghanistan Naskh is the more common script, in Pakistan, similar to Urdu and other orthographies of northern Pakistan, Nastaliq is the more common script.

Wakhi letters (Pakistan)
Wakhi (Latin) [IPA]	ا^{1} ‌ - (A a/E e/I i/U u) [∅]([ɨ][ɔ][e][i])	آ / ـا^{2} (A a) [a]	ب (B b) [b]	پ (P p) [p]	ت (T t) [t̪]	ٹ (Ṭ ṭ) [ʈ]
Wakhi (Latin) [IPA]	ث^{3} (S s) [s]	ٿ^{3} (Θ ϑ) [θ]	ج (J̌ ǰ) [d͡ʒ]	ڃ (Ž ž) [ʒ]	چ (Č č) [t͡ʃ]	ڇ (Č̣ č̣) [ʈ͡ʂ]
Wakhi (Latin) [IPA]	ح (H h) [h]	خ (X x) [χ]	ݗ (X̌ x̌) [x]	څ (C c) [t͡s]	د (D d) [d̪]	ڈ (Ḍ ḍ) [ɖ]
Wakhi (Latin) [IPA]	ذ^{4} (Z z) [z]	ڌ^{4} (Δ δ) [ð]	ر (R r) [r]	ز (Z z) [z]	ڗ (Ʒ ʒ) [d͡z]	ژ (Ẓ̌ ẓ̌) [ʐ]
Wakhi (Latin) [IPA]	ڙ (J̣̌ ǰ̣) [ɖ͡ʐ]	س (S s) [s]	ش (Š š) [ʃ]	ݜ (Ṣ̌ ṣ̌) [ʂ]	ص (S s) [s]	ض (Z z) [z]
Wakhi (Latin) [IPA]	ط (T t) [t̪]	ظ (Z z) [z]	ع ( - ) [∅]/[ʔ]	غ (Ɣ γ) [ʁ]	ݝ (Ɣ̌ ɣ̌) [ɣ]	ف (F f) [f]
Wakhi (Latin) [IPA]	ڤ (V v) [v]	ق (Q q) [q]	ک (K k) [k]	گ (G g) [ɡ]	ل (L l) [l]	م (M m) [m]
Wakhi (Latin) [IPA]	ن (N n) [n]	او / ـُو / و^{5} (O o/U u/W w) [ɔ][u][w]	ہـ / ہ^{7} (H h/ - a) [h][a]	ایـ / یـ / ی^{8,9} (E e/I i/Y y) [e][i][j]	ے^{9} (- e) [e]	

Notes:

1. Letter alef at the beginning of a word can serve two functions. First, it precedes vowel letters "ایـ" [e] and [i], or "او" [ɔ]. Second, it acts as a vowel carrier for diacritics of the vowel, "اُ" [ɨ].
2. Vowel phoneme [a] is represented with "آ" when at the beginning of a word, and with "ـا / ا" when in the middle or end of a word.
3. While the letter se "ث" represents the phoneme [θ], this letter in loanwords that have entered Dari have come to be pronounced as [s]. Due to consistent contact with Dari and Urdu, those loanwords have entered Wakhi via Dari and Urdu (which in turn has been heavily influenced by Persian), with their Persian pronunciations. Unlike Persian, Wakhi does have a separate phoneme [θ]. Some sources use the letter se "ث", whereas others use a new letter, te with 4 dots "ٿ" that has been introduced so that there can be distinguishment between the native sound [θ] and the sound [s] produced by the letter se "ث" in loanwords.
4. While the letter zal "ذ" represents the phoneme [ð], this letter in loanwords in Dari and Urdu have come to be pronounced [z]. Due to consistent contact with Dari and Urdu, those loanwords have entered Wakhi with their Persian pronunciations. Unlike Persian and Urdu, Wakhi does have a separate phoneme [ð]. Some sources use the letter zal "ذ", whereas others use a new letter, dal with 2 dots "ڌ" that has been introduced so that there can be distinguishment between the native sound [ð] and the sound [z] produced by the letter zal "ذ" in loanwords.
5. Represents three phonemes based on context, [w], [ɔ], and [u]. If used at the beginning of a word, if representing consonant [w], it will be written standalone "و". If representing a vowel [ɔ], it will be preceded by alef "او". If representing the vowel [u], it will be preceded by a [w] consonant, carrying a zammah diacritic "وُو".
6. At the end of a word, the letter he "ـہ ہ" can either represent a consonant sound [h] or a vowel sound [a] depending on context.
7. The letter ye represents three phonemes based on context, [e], [i] and [j]. If used at the beginning of a word, if representing consonant [j], it will be written standalone "یـ", if representing a vowel [e] or a vowel [i], it will be preceded by alef "ایـ".
8. There are two types of final ye. in At the end of a word, if representing the consonant [j] or the vowel [i], the small ye "ی" is used. If representing the vowel [e], the big ye "ے" is used.

Wakhi vowels (Pakistan)
A a	E e	I i	Ə ə	Ы ы	O o	U u
[a]	[e]	[i]	[ə]	[ɨ]	[ɔ]	[u]
Vowels at the beginning of a word
آ	ایـ		-	اُ	او	وُو
Vowels at the middle of a word
◌َ / ا / ـا	◌ِ / یـ / ـیـ		-	◌ُ	و / ـو	◌ُو / ـُو
Vowels at the end of a word
ہ / ـہ	ے / ـے	ی / ـی		◌ُ / ـُہ	و / ـو	◌ُو / ـُو

=== Cyrillic script ===
When Wakhi is written in Cyrillic, the sounds are usually represented by these letters:

Letter	А а	Б б	В в	В̌ в̌	Г г	Ғ ғ	Г̌ г̌	Д д	Д̣ д̣	Д̌ д̌	Е е	Ё ё	Ж ж	Ж̣ ж̣	З з	Ҙ ҙ	И и	Й й	К к	Қ қ	Л л	М м	Н н	О о	П п
IPA	[a]	[b]	[v]	[w]	[ɡ]	[ʁ]	[ɣ]	[d̪]	[ɖ]	[ð]	[e], [je]	[jo]	[ʒ]	[ʐ]	[z]	[d͡z]	[i]	[j]	[k]	[q]	[l]	[m]	[n]	[ɔ]	[p]
Letter	Р р	С с	Т т	Т̣ т̣	Т̌ т̌	У у	Ф ф	Х х	Х̌ х̌	Ҳ ҳ	Ц ц	Ч ч	Ч̣ ч̣	Ҷ ҷ	Ҷ̣ ҷ̣	Ш ш	Ш̣ ш̣	Щ щ	Ъ ъ	Ы ы	Ә ә	Ь ь	Э э	Ю ю	Я я
IPA	[r]	[s]	[t̪]	[ʈ]	[θ]	[u]	[f]	[χ]	[x]	[h]	[t͡s]	[t͡ʃ]	[ʈ͡ʂ]	[d͡ʒ]	[ɖ͡ʐ]	[ʃ]	[ʂ]	[ʃt͡ʃ]	Ø	[ɨ]	[ə]	Ø	[e]	[ju]	[ja]

=== Latin script ===
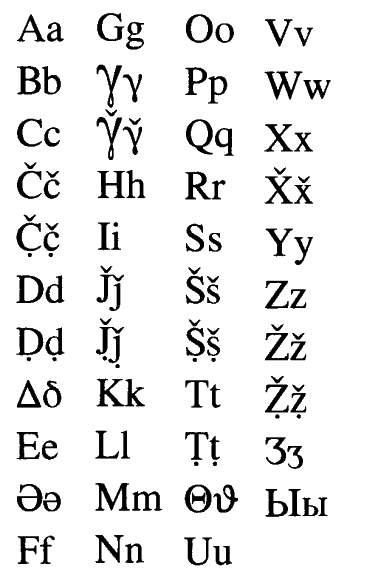
The evangelical Wakhi alphabet, which includes some Cyrillic and Greek letters. Vowel diacritics are not shown.

A Latin alphabet, which in some variants includes Cyrillic and Greek letters, was developed in 1953 by I.I. Zaroubine and V. S. Sokolova, and further developed by A.L Grünberg and I.M Stéblinn-Kamensky in the early 1960s:

Letter	A a	Ā ā	Ā̒ ā̒	B b	C c	Č č	Č̣ č̣	D d	Ḍ ḍ	Δ δ	E e	Ə ə	F f	G g	Ɣ ɣ*	Ɣ̌ ɣ̌*	H h	I i	J̌ ǰ	J̣̌ ǰ̣	K k	L l	M m	N n	
IPA	[a]			[b]	[t͡s]	[t͡ʃ]	[ʈ͡ʂ]	[d̪]	[ɖ]	[ð]	[e]	[ə]	[f]	[ɡ]	[ʁ]	[ɣ]	[h]	[i]	[d͡ʒ]	[ɖ͡ʐ]	[k]	[l]	[m]	[n]	
Letter	O o	Ō ō	Ō̒ ō̒	P p	Q q	R r	S s	Š š	Ṣ̌ ṣ̌	T t	Ṭ ṭ	Θ θ	U u	U̒ u̒	Ū̒ ū̒	V v	W w	X x	X̌ x̌	Y y	Z z	Ž ž	Ẓ̌ ẓ̌	Ʒ ʒ	Ы ы
IPA	[ɔ]			[p]	[q]	[r]	[s]	[ʃ]	[ʂ]	[t̪]	[ʈ]	[θ]	[u]			[v]	[w]	[χ]	[x]	[j]	[z]	[ʒ]	[ʐ]	[d͡z]	[ɨ]

*Ɣ ɣ, Ɣ̌ ɣ̌ are Greek gammas as lowercase, and large Greek gammas as capitals. Latin gamma is the closest character available in Unicode.

== Vocabulary ==
The Wakhi lexicon exhibits significant differences with the other Pamir languages. Gawarjon's comparison of the dialects of Sarikoli and Wakhi spoken in China is reproduced below.

Lexical comparison of seven Iranian languages
English gloss	Persian	Tajik	Shughni	Sarikoli	Pashto	Wakhi	Avestan
one	jæk (یک)	jak (як)	jiw	iw	jaw (يو)	ji	aēuua-
meat	ɡuʃt (گوشت)	ɡuʃt (гушт)	ɡuːxt	ɡɯxt	ɣwaxa, ɣwaʂa (غوښه)	ɡuʂt	?
son	pesær (پسر)	pisar (писар)	puts	pɯts	zoi (زوی)	putr	puθra-
fire	ɒtæʃ (اتش)	otaʃ (оташ)	joːts	juts	or (اور)	rɯχniɡ	ātar-
water	ɒb (اب)	ob (об)	xats	xats	obə (اوبه)	jupk	āp-, ap-
hand	dæst (دست)	dast (даст)	ðust	ðɯst	lɑs (لاس)	ðast	zasta-
foot	pɒ (پا)	po (по)	poːð	peð	pxa, pʂa (پښه)	pɯð	pāδ-
tooth	dændɒn (دندان)	dandon (дандон)	ðinðʉn	ðanðun	ɣɑx, ɣɑʂ (غاښ)	ðɯnðɯk	daṇt-
eye	tʃæʃm (چشم)	tʃaʃm (чашм)	tsem	tsem	stərɡa (سترګه)	tʂəʐm	cašman-
horse	æsb (اسب)	asp (асп)	voːrdʒ	vurdʒ	ɑs (masculine), aspa (feminine) (آس,اسپه)	jaʃ	aspa-
cloud	æbr (ابر)	abr (абр)	abre	varm	urjadz (اوريځ)	mur	maēγa-, aβra-
wheat	ɡændom (گندم)	ɡandum (гандум)	ʒindam	ʒandam	ɣanam (غنم)	ɣɯdim	gaṇtuma-
many	besjɒr (بسيار)	bisjor (бисёр)	bisjoːr	pɯr	ɖer (ډېر)	təqi	pouru-
high	bolænd (بلند)	baland (баланд)	biland	bɯland	lwaɻ (لوړ)	bɯland	bərəzaṇt-
far	dur (دور)	dur (дур)	ðar	ðar	ləre (لرې)	ðir	dūra-
good	χub (خوب)	χub (хуб)	baʃand	tʃardʒ	xə, ʂə (ښه)	baf	vohu-, vaŋhu-
small	kutʃik (کوچک)	χurd (хурд)	dzulik	dzɯl	ləɡ, ləʐ (لږ)	dzəqlai	?
to say	ɡoft (گفت)	ɡuft (гуфт)	lʉvdo	levd	wajəl (ويل)	xənak	aoj-, mrū-, saŋh-
to do	kærd (کرد)	kard (кард)	tʃiːdo	tʃeiɡ	kawəl (کول)	tsərak	kar-
easiness	ɒsɒni (آسانی)	osonj (осонй)	os:une	ossoni	asanatiya (اسانتیا)	ossony	usi-
to see	did (ديد)/ bin (present stem)	did (дид)/ bin(бин)	wiːnto	wand	lid (لید)/ win (present stem)	wiŋɡ	dī-, vaēn-

== Publications ==
In Pakistan multiple books have been published since 1980s:

- X̌ikwor zik by Master Haqiqat
- Religious hymns by Riaz Ahmed Riaz
- Qaida e Wakhi Zaban by Ahmed Jami Sakhi
- Magazines and Parlon Wakhi by Karim Khan Saka
- Beyoz-e-Bulbul by Nazir Ahmad Bulbul, A collection of old and new poems folklores compiled by Bulbulik Heritage Center, Gulmit

== Sample text ==
Sample text from a Bible translation published in 2001 is shown here below:

Lord's Prayer (Luke 11:2–4)
Wakhi in Latin alphabet	Wakhi in Cyrillic alphabet	English (ESV)
^{2}Yiso yavər x̌atəy: «Sayišt ʒi dəo carəv, x̌anəv: „Ey bzыrgwor Tat ki də osmonət cəy! Ti bəzыrg nung bər olam ыmыt! Ləcər dəwroni Ti podšoyi γ̌at-ət, zəmin-ət zəmon də hыkmi taw ыmыt!	^{2}Йисо йавəр х̌атəй: «Сайишт ҙи дəо царəв, х̌анəв: „Ей бзыргв̌ор Тат ки дə осмонəт цəй! Ти бəзырг нунг бəр олам ымыт! Лəцəр дəв̌рони Ти подшойи г̌ат-əт, зəмин-əт зəмон дə ҳыкми тав̌ ымыт!	^{2}And he said to them, When you pray, say: Father, hallowed be your name. Your kingdom come.
^{3}Spo rыsq-ət rыzi sakər nəsib car!	^{3}Спо рысқ-əт рызи сакəр нəсиб цар!	^{3}Give us each day our daily bread,
^{4}Cə spo gənoən šəxs! Sak bə kuy, ki sakər šakiγ̌ cə kərk! kыx̌tər baxṣ̌əṣ̌ carən. Cə bandi nafs-ət awasən, Cə waswasayi Iblisən saki niga δыr!“»	^{4}Цə спо гəноəн шəхс! Сак бə куй, ки сакəр шакиг̌ цə кəрк! Кых̌тəр бахш̣əш̣ царəн. Цə банди нафс-əт ав̌асəн, Цə в̌асв̌асайи Иблисəн саки нига д̌ыр!“»	^{4}and forgive us our sins, for we ourselves forgive everyone who is indebted to us. And lead us not into temptation.
Wakhi in Arabic Script (Afghanistan)	Wakhi in Arabic Script (Pakistan)	Dari
^{۲}عیسا یَڤر ښَتی:‌ «سَییشت ځي دعا څَری ښَنڤ: ای بزؤرگوار تَت کي دی آسمانت څی! تي بزؤرگ نونگ بر عالم اؤمؤت! لڅر دورانی تي پادشایي ږَتت، زمینت زمان دی حؤکمي تَو اؤمؤت!	^{۲}عیسو یاڤر ݗاتی:‌ «ساییشت ڃی دعو څانڤ:‌ ای بزُرگووْر تات دی اوسمونت څای! تی بزُرگ نُونگ بر عولَم اُمُت! لڅر دورونی تی پودشویی ݝاتت، زمینت زمون دی حُکمی تاو اُمُت!	^{۲}عیسی به آنها گفت: «هر وقت دعا می کنید، بگویید: ای پدر آسمانی، نام تو مقدس باد. پادشاهی تو بیاید.
^{۳}سپا رؤزقت رؤزي سَکر نصیب څَر!	^{۳}سپو رُزقت زُزی ساکر نصیب څار!	^{۳}نان روزانۀ ما را امروز به ما بده.
^{۴}څی سپا گناهن شخص! سک بی کوی، کي سَکر شاکیږ څی کرک! کؤښتر بخڜڜ څَرن. څی بَندي نَفست اَوَسن، څی وَسوَسه‌یي اِبلیسن سَکي نیگه ڎؤر!»	^{۴}څی سپو گنوهن شخص! سکا بی کوی، کی ساکر شاکیݝ څی کرک! کُݗتر باخݜݜ څارن. څی باندی نَفست آواسن، څی وَسوَسه‌یی اِبلیسن ساکی نیگہ ڌُر!»	^{۴}گناهان ما را ببخش، زیرا ما نیز همه کسانی را که به ما گناه کرده اند می بخشیم. ما را آزمایش مکن.»

== See also ==
- Wakhi people
