= Te with caron =

Cyrillic letter used for /θ/ in Shughni and Wakhi

- Т̌ т̌

Usage
- Writing system: Cyrillic
- Type: Alphabetic
- Sound values: /θ/, formerly /tʲ/

Te with caron (Т̌ т̌; italics: Т̌ т̌) is a letter of the Cyrillic script. It is used in the Shughni and Wakhi languages for the /θ/ sound, like the ⟨th⟩ in 'thing'. It was also used in three Chuvash alphabets published around the turn of the 20th century to represent /tʲ/.

== See also ==
- Ҫ ҫ : Cyrillic letter The, representing the same sound
- Д̌ д̌ : Cyrillic letter De with caron
- Ť ť : Latin letter T with caron - a Czech and Slovak letter.
- Cyrillic script in Unicode
