= J̌ =

Latin letter J with caron

J with caron
- J̌ ǰ

Usage
- Writing system: Latin script
- Type: Alphabet

J̌ (minuscule: ǰ), called J with caron, is a letter of the Latin alphabet, derived from J with the addition of a caron (háček). It is used in some phonetic transcription schemes, e.g. ISO 9, to represent the sound [d͡ʒ]. It is also used in the Latin scripts or in the romanization of various Iranian and Pamir languages (Avestan, Pashto, Yaghnobi, and others), Armenian, Georgian, Berber/Tuareg, and Classical Mongolian. The letter was invented by Lepsius in his Standard Alphabet on the model of š and ž to avoid the confusion caused by the ambiguous pronunciation of the letter j in European languages.

== Unicode ==
Unusually for a letter in the Latin script, only the lower-case ǰ is encoded as a pre-composed character in Unicode. The capital J̌ is the sequence J followed by U+030C COMBINING CARON. Rendering the latter form correctly requires the relevant OpenType Layout support in the font, which may not be present on all fonts and/or work in all systems.
