= Combining character =

Non-spacing character that modifies another character

Cyrillic U combined with breve gives ў.

In digital typography, combining characters are characters that are intended to modify other characters. The most common combining characters in the Latin script are the combining diacritical marks (including combining accents).

Unicode also contains many precomposed characters, so that in many cases it is possible to use both combining diacritics and precomposed characters, at the user's or application's choice. This leads to a requirement to perform Unicode normalization before comparing two Unicode strings and to carefully design encoding converters to correctly map all of the valid ways to represent a character in Unicode to a legacy encoding to avoid data loss.

In Unicode, the main block of combining diacritics for European languages and the International Phonetic Alphabet is U+0300–U+036F. Combining diacritical marks are also present in many other blocks of Unicode characters. In Unicode, diacritics are always added after the main character (in contrast to some older combining character sets such as ANSEL), and it is possible to add several diacritics to the same character, including stacked diacritics above and below, though some systems may not render these well.

== Unicode ranges ==
The following blocks are dedicated specifically to combining characters:

- Combining Diacritical Marks (0300–036F), since version 1.0, with modifications in subsequent versions down to 4.1
- Combining Diacritical Marks Extended (1AB0–1AFF), version 7.0
- Combining Diacritical Marks Supplement (1DC0–1DFF), versions 4.1 to 5.2
- Combining Diacritical Marks for Symbols (20D0–20FF), since version 1.0, with modifications in subsequent versions down to 5.1
- Cyrillic Extended-A (2DE0–2DFF), version 5.1
- Combining Half Marks (FE20–FE2F), versions 1.0, with modifications in subsequent versions down to 8.0

Combining characters are not limited to these blocks; for instance, the combining dakuten (U+3099) and combining handakuten (U+309A) are in the Hiragana block, the Devanagari block contains combining vowel signs and other marks for use with that script, and so forth. Combining characters are assigned the Unicode major category "M" ("Mark").

=== Combining Diacritical Marks (0300–036F) ===
Combining Diacritical Marks^{[1]} Official Unicode Consortium code chart (PDF)
	0	1	2	3	4	5	6	7	8	9	A	B	C	D	E	F
U+030x	◌̀	◌́	◌̂	◌̃	◌̄	◌̅	◌̆	◌̇	◌̈	◌̉	◌̊	◌̋	◌̌	◌̍	◌̎	◌̏
U+031x	◌̐	◌̑	◌̒	◌̓	◌̔	◌̕	◌̖	◌̗	◌̘	◌̙	◌̚	◌̛	◌̜	◌̝	◌̞	◌̟
U+032x	◌̠	◌̡	◌̢	◌̣	◌̤	◌̥	◌̦	◌̧	◌̨	◌̩	◌̪	◌̫	◌̬	◌̭	◌̮	◌̯
U+033x	◌̰	◌̱	◌̲	◌̳	◌̴	◌̵	◌̶	◌̷	◌̸	◌̹	◌̺	◌̻	◌̼	◌̽	◌̾	◌̿
U+034x	◌̀	◌́	◌͂	◌̓	◌̈́	◌ͅ	◌͆	◌͇	◌͈	◌͉	◌͊	◌͋	◌͌	◌͍	◌͎	CGJ
U+035x	◌͐	◌͑	◌͒	◌͓	◌͔	◌͕	◌͖	◌͗	◌͘	◌͙	◌͚	◌͛	◌͜◌	◌͝◌	◌͞◌	◌͟◌
U+036x	◌͠◌	◌͡◌	◌͢◌	◌ͣ	◌ͤ	◌ͥ	◌ͦ	◌ͧ	◌ͨ	◌ͩ	◌ͪ	◌ͫ	◌ͬ	◌ͭ	◌ͮ	◌ͯ
Notes 1.As of Unicode version 17.0

Codepoints U+032A and U+0346–034A are IPA symbols:

- U+032A ◌̪: dental
- U+0346 ◌͆: dentolabial
- U+0347 ◌͇: alveolar
- U+0348 ◌͈: strong articulation
- U+0349 ◌͉: weak articulation
- U+034A ◌͊: denasal

Codepoints U+034B–034E are IPA diacritics for disordered speech:

- U+034B ◌͋: nasal escape
- U+034C ◌͌: velopharyngeal friction
- U+034D ◌͍: labial spreading
- U+034E ◌͎: whistled articulation

U+034F is the "combining grapheme joiner" (CGJ) and has no visible glyph.

Codepoints U+035C–0362 are double diacritics, diacritic signs placed across two letters.

Codepoints U+0363–036F are medieval superscript letter diacritics, letters written directly above other letters appearing in medieval Germanic manuscripts, but in some instances in use until as late as the 19th century. For example, U+0364 is an e written above the preceding letter, to be used for (Early) New High German umlaut notation, such as uͤ for Modern German ü.

=== Combining Diacritical Marks Extended (1AB0–1AFF) ===
Combining Diacritical Marks Extended^{[1]}^{[2]} Official Unicode Consortium code chart (PDF)
	0	1	2	3	4	5	6	7	8	9	A	B	C	D	E	F
U+1ABx	◌᪰	◌᪱	◌᪲	◌᪳	◌᪴	◌᪵	◌᪶	◌᪷	◌᪸	◌᪹	◌᪺	◌᪻	◌᪼	◌᪽	◌᪾	◌ᪿ
U+1ACx	◌ᫀ	◌᫁	◌᫂	◌᫃	◌᫄	◌᫅	◌᫆	◌᫇	◌᫈	◌᫉	◌᫊	◌᫋	◌ᫌ	◌ᫍ	◌ᫎ	◌᫏
U+1ADx	◌᫐	◌᫑	◌᫒	◌᫓	◌᫔	◌᫕	◌᫖	◌᫗	◌᫘	◌᫙	◌᫚	◌᫛	◌᫜	◌᫝		
U+1AEx	◌᫠	◌᫡	◌᫢	◌᫣	◌᫤	◌᫥	◌᫦	◌᫧	◌᫨	◌᫩	◌᫪	◌᫫				
U+1AFx																
Notes 1.As of Unicode version 17.0 2.Grey areas indicate non-assigned code points

=== Combining Diacritical Marks Supplement (1DC0–1DFF) ===
Combining Diacritical Marks Supplement^{[1]} Official Unicode Consortium code chart (PDF)
	0	1	2	3	4	5	6	7	8	9	A	B	C	D	E	F
U+1DCx	◌᷀	◌᷁	◌᷂	◌᷃	◌᷄	◌᷅	◌᷆	◌᷇	◌᷈	◌᷉	◌᷊	◌᷋	◌᷌	◌᷍	◌᷎	◌᷏
U+1DDx	◌᷐	◌᷑	◌᷒	◌ᷓ	◌ᷔ	◌ᷕ	◌ᷖ	◌ᷗ	◌ᷘ	◌ᷙ	◌ᷚ	◌ᷛ	◌ᷜ	◌ᷝ	◌ᷞ	◌ᷟ
U+1DEx	◌ᷠ	◌ᷡ	◌ᷢ	◌ᷣ	◌ᷤ	◌ᷥ	◌ᷦ	◌ᷧ	◌ᷨ	◌ᷩ	◌ᷪ	◌ᷫ	◌ᷬ	◌ᷭ	◌ᷮ	◌ᷯ
U+1DFx	◌ᷰ	◌ᷱ	◌ᷲ	◌ᷳ	◌ᷴ	◌᷵	◌᷶	◌᷷	◌᷸	◌᷹	◌᷺	◌᷻	◌᷼	◌᷽	◌᷾	◌᷿
Notes 1.As of Unicode version 17.0

=== Combining Diacritical Marks for Symbols (20D0–20FF) ===
Combining Diacritical Marks for Symbols^{[1]}^{[2]} Official Unicode Consortium code chart (PDF)
	0	1	2	3	4	5	6	7	8	9	A	B	C	D	E	F
U+20Dx	◌⃐	◌⃑	◌⃒	◌⃓	◌⃔	◌⃕	◌⃖	◌⃗	◌⃘	◌⃙	◌⃚	◌⃛	◌⃜	◌⃝	◌⃞	◌⃟
U+20Ex	◌⃠	◌⃡	◌⃢	◌⃣	◌⃤	◌⃥	◌⃦	◌⃧	◌⃨	◌⃩	◌⃪	◌⃫	◌⃬	◌⃭	◌⃮	◌⃯
U+20Fx	◌⃰															
Notes 1.As of Unicode version 17.0 2.Grey areas indicate non-assigned code points

=== Combining Half Marks (FE20–FE2F) ===
Combining Half Marks^{[1]} Official Unicode Consortium code chart (PDF)
	0	1	2	3	4	5	6	7	8	9	A	B	C	D	E	F
U+FE2x	◌︠	◌︡	◌︢	◌︣	◌︤	◌︥	◌︦	◌︧	◌︨	◌︩	◌︪	◌︫	◌︬	◌︭	◌︮	◌︯
Notes 1.As of Unicode version 17.0

== OpenType ==
OpenType has the ccmp "feature tag" to define glyphs that are compositions or decompositions involving combining characters, the mark tag to define the positioning of combining characters onto base glyph, and mkmk for the positionings of combining characters onto each other.

== Zalgo text ==
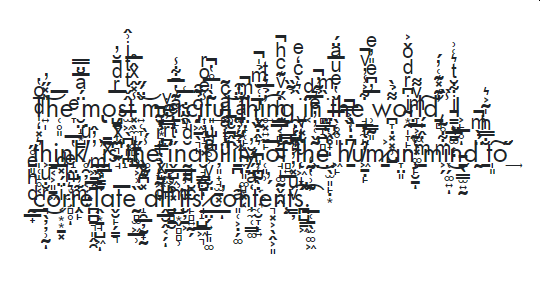
A sentence of Zalgo text

Combining characters have been used to create Zalgo text, which is text that appears "corrupted" or "creepy" due to an overuse of combining characters. This causes the text to extend vertically, overlapping other text. This is mostly used in horror contexts on the Internet. It is typically very challenging for most software to render, so the combining marks are often reduced or completely stripped off.

== See also ==
- Dotted circle
- Dead key
- Spacing Modifier Letters which shouldn't combine (although they do erroneously on some implementations where a developer has confused "combining" with "modifier")
