= Ge with caron =

Cyrillic letter used for /ɣ/ in Shughni and Wakhi

- Г̌ г̌

Usage
- Writing system: Cyrillic
- Type: Alphabetic
- Language of origin: Shughni, Wakhi
- Sound values: /ɣ/

Ge with caron (Г̌ г̌ italics: Г̌ г̌) is a letter of the Cyrillic script. It is used in the Shughni and Wakhi languages, where it represents the voiced velar fricative /ɣ/, like the Scottish ⟨ch⟩ in "loch" but voiced.

== See also ==
- Cyrillic script in Unicode
