= De with caron =

Cyrillic letter used for /ð/ in Shughni and Wakhi

- Д̌ д̌

Usage
- Writing system: Cyrillic
- Type: Alphabetic
- Sound values: [ð]

De with caron (Д̌, д̌; italics: Д̌, д̌) is an additional letter of the Cyrillic script used in the Shughni and Wakhi languages. It is composed of the letter de ⟨Д⟩ with a caron.

== Usage ==
De with caron is used in the Shughni alphabet and the Wakhi alphabet where it represents the voiced dental fricative [ð], like the th in they. Sometimes, in Shughni, it is written as the digraph дъ.

== Computing codes ==
De with caron can be represented with the following Unicode characters :

Character information
Preview	Д		д		̌	
Unicode name	CYRILLIC CAPITAL LETTER DE		CYRILLIC SMALL LETTER DE		COMBINING CARON	
Encodings	decimal	hex	dec	hex	dec	hex
Unicode	1044	U+0414	1076	U+0434	780	U+030C
UTF-8	208 148	D0 94	208 180	D0 B4	204 140	CC 8C
Numeric character reference	&#1044;	&#x414;	&#1076;	&#x434;	&#780;	&#x30C;
Named character reference	&Dcy;		&dcy;			

== See also ==
- Ҙ ҙ : Cyrillic letter Dhe
