= A̍ =

Latin letter A with vertical line above

A̍, or a̍, called "A with vertical line", is a letter used in the standard, unified spelling in the Democratic Republic of Congo and the Pe̍h-ōe-jī romanization system for writing Hokkien (including Taiwanese). It consists of the letter A with a vertical line appearing as a diacritic above it.

== Uses ==
=== Democratic Republic of the Congo ===
The standard, unified spelling of Democratic Republic of the Congo uses the vertical line to indicate the middle tone in tonal languages needing to distinguish it. The 'a̍' represents an 'a' with a medium tone.

=== Taiwan ===
In Pe̍h-ōe-jī and the Taiwanese romanization system used to write Hokkien, the 'a̍' represents an 'a' with tone 8, depending on the specific Hokkien dialect.

== Digital encoding ==
The A with vertical line can be represented in Unicode as a breakdown into the following pairs of characters, each consisting of a Latin letter followed by a diacritic.

Form	Representation	Code points	Descriptions
upper case	A̍	U+0041U+030D	Latin Capital Letter A Combining Vertical Line Above
lower case	a̍	U+0061U+030D	Latin Small Letter A Combining Vertical Line Above

== See also ==
- Latin script
- A

== Sources ==
- Draft of Proposal to add Latin characters required by Latinized Taiwanese Holo Language to ISO/IEC 10646
