= Latin script in Unicode =

Characters from the Latin script encoded in the Unicode Standard

Over a thousand characters from the Latin script are encoded in the Unicode Standard, grouped in several basic and extended Latin blocks. The extended ranges contain mainly precomposed letters plus diacritics that are equivalently encoded with combining diacritics, as well as some ligatures and distinct letters, used for example in the orthographies of various African languages (including click symbols in Latin Extended-B) and the Vietnamese alphabet (Latin Extended Additional). Latin Extended-C contains additions for Uighur and the Claudian letters. Latin Extended-D comprises miscellaneous characters, of which Medievalist characters are a prominent category. Latin Extended-E mostly comprises characters used for German dialectology (Teuthonista). Latin Extended-F and -G contain characters for phonetic transcription. Precomposed letters with diacritics were only included when extant in standards predating Unicode, for facilitating conversion. Letters with diacritics not found in Unicode, e.g. some letters in DIN 91379, are no longer eligible for encoding, and can only be represented as sequences of base letters and Combining Diacritical Marks.

== Blocks ==
As of version 18.0 of the Unicode Standard, 1,653 characters in the following 19 blocks are classified as belonging to the Latin script property.

- Basic Latin, 0000–007F. This block corresponds to ASCII.
- Latin-1 Supplement, 0080–00FF. This block and the ASCII part collectively corresponds to IANA Latin-1.
- Latin Extended-A, 0100–017F
- Latin Extended-B, 0180–024F
- IPA Extensions, 0250–02AF
- Spacing Modifier Letters, 02B0–02FF
- Phonetic Extensions, 1D00–1D7F
- Phonetic Extensions Supplement, 1D80–1DBF
- Latin Extended Additional, 1E00–1EFF
- Superscripts and Subscripts, 2070–209F
- Letterlike Symbols, 2100–214F
- Number Forms, 2150–218F
- Latin Extended-C, 2C60–2C7F
- Latin Extended-D, A720–A7FF
- Latin Extended-E, AB30–AB6F
- Alphabetic Presentation Forms (Latin ligatures) FB00–FB4F
- Halfwidth and Fullwidth Forms, FF00–FFEF
- Latin Extended-F, 10780–107BF
- Latin Extended-G, 1DF00–1DFFF

In addition, a number of Latin-like characters are encoded in the Currency Symbols, Control Pictures, CJK Compatibility, Enclosed Alphanumerics, Enclosed CJK Letters and Months, Mathematical Alphanumeric Symbols, and Enclosed Alphanumeric Supplement blocks, but, although they are Latin letters graphically, they have the script property common, and, so, do not belong to the Latin script in Unicode terms. Lisu also consists almost entirely of Latin forms, but uses its own script property. Combining Diacritical Marks, Combining Diacritical Marks Extended, and Combining Diacritical Marks Supplement all have a number of Latin characters, but their official script property is inherited.

== Table of characters ==
In this table those characters with the Unicode script property of Latin are highlighted in colour, indicating the version of Unicode they were introduced in. Reserved code points (which may be assigned as characters at a future date) have a grey background. All characters that do not belong to the Latin script have a white background (and the version of Unicode they were introduced in is therefore not indicated).

Legend: Unicode version
Unicode 1.0	Unicode 6.1
Unicode 1.1	Unicode 7.0
Unicode 2.0	Unicode 8.0
Unicode 3.0	Unicode 9.0
Unicode 3.2	Unicode 11.0
Unicode 4.0	Unicode 12.0
Unicode 4.1	Unicode 13.0
Unicode 5.0	Unicode 14.0
Unicode 5.1	Unicode 15.0
Unicode 5.2	Unicode 16.0
Unicode 6.0	Unicode 17.0
	Unicode 18.0
Reserved	Not Latin script

U+	0	1	2	3	4	5	6	7	8	9	A	B	C	D	E	F	Block	#
0040	@	A	B	C	D	E	F	G	H	I	J	K	L	M	N	O	C0 Controls and Basic Latin; 0000–007F (identical to ASCII)	52
0050	P	Q	R	S	T	U	V	W	X	Y	Z	[	\	]	^	_	C0 Controls and Basic Latin; 0000–007F (identical to ASCII)	52
0060	`	a	b	c	d	e	f	g	h	i	j	k	l	m	n	o	C0 Controls and Basic Latin; 0000–007F (identical to ASCII)	52
0070	p	q	r	s	t	u	v	w	x	y	z	{	|	}	~	DEL	C0 Controls and Basic Latin; 0000–007F (identical to ASCII)	52
00A0		¡	¢	£	¤	¥	¦	§	¨	©	ª	«	¬		®	¯	C1 Controls and Latin-1 Supplement; 0080–00FF (identical to ISO/IEC 8859-1)	64
00B0	°	±	²	³	´	µ	¶	·	¸	¹	º	»	¼	½	¾	¿	C1 Controls and Latin-1 Supplement; 0080–00FF (identical to ISO/IEC 8859-1)	64
00C0	À	Á	Â	Ã	Ä	Å	Æ	Ç	È	É	Ê	Ë	Ì	Í	Î	Ï	C1 Controls and Latin-1 Supplement; 0080–00FF (identical to ISO/IEC 8859-1)	64
00D0	Ð	Ñ	Ò	Ó	Ô	Õ	Ö	×	Ø	Ù	Ú	Û	Ü	Ý	Þ	ß	C1 Controls and Latin-1 Supplement; 0080–00FF (identical to ISO/IEC 8859-1)	64
00E0	à	á	â	ã	ä	å	æ	ç	è	é	ê	ë	ì	í	î	ï	C1 Controls and Latin-1 Supplement; 0080–00FF (identical to ISO/IEC 8859-1)	64
00F0	ð	ñ	ò	ó	ô	õ	ö	÷	ø	ù	ú	û	ü	ý	þ	ÿ	C1 Controls and Latin-1 Supplement; 0080–00FF (identical to ISO/IEC 8859-1)	64
0100	Ā	ā	Ă	ă	Ą	ą	Ć	ć	Ĉ	ĉ	Ċ	ċ	Č	č	Ď	ď	Latin Extended-A; 0100–017F	128
0110	Đ	đ	Ē	ē	Ĕ	ĕ	Ė	ė	Ę	ę	Ě	ě	Ĝ	ĝ	Ğ	ğ	Latin Extended-A; 0100–017F	128
0120	Ġ	ġ	Ģ	ģ	Ĥ	ĥ	Ħ	ħ	Ĩ	ĩ	Ī	ī	Ĭ	ĭ	Į	į	Latin Extended-A; 0100–017F	128
0130	İ	ı	Ĳ	ĳ	Ĵ	ĵ	Ķ	ķ	ĸ	Ĺ	ĺ	Ļ	ļ	Ľ	ľ	Ŀ	Latin Extended-A; 0100–017F	128
0140	ŀ	Ł	ł	Ń	ń	Ņ	ņ	Ň	ň	ŉ	Ŋ	ŋ	Ō	ō	Ŏ	ŏ	Latin Extended-A; 0100–017F	128
0150	Ő	ő	Œ	œ	Ŕ	ŕ	Ŗ	ŗ	Ř	ř	Ś	ś	Ŝ	ŝ	Ş	ş	Latin Extended-A; 0100–017F	128
0160	Š	š	Ţ	ţ	Ť	ť	Ŧ	ŧ	Ũ	ũ	Ū	ū	Ŭ	ŭ	Ů	ů	Latin Extended-A; 0100–017F	128
0170	Ű	ű	Ų	ų	Ŵ	ŵ	Ŷ	ŷ	Ÿ	Ź	ź	Ż	ż	Ž	ž	ſ	Latin Extended-A; 0100–017F	128
0180	ƀ	Ɓ	Ƃ	ƃ	Ƅ	ƅ	Ɔ	Ƈ	ƈ	Ɖ	Ɗ	Ƌ	ƌ	ƍ	Ǝ	Ə	Latin Extended-B; 0180–024F	208
0190	Ɛ	Ƒ	ƒ	Ɠ	Ɣ	ƕ	Ɩ	Ɨ	Ƙ	ƙ	ƚ	ƛ	Ɯ	Ɲ	ƞ	Ɵ	Latin Extended-B; 0180–024F	208
01A0	Ơ	ơ	Ƣ	ƣ	Ƥ	ƥ	Ʀ	Ƨ	ƨ	Ʃ	ƪ	ƫ	Ƭ	ƭ	Ʈ	Ư	Latin Extended-B; 0180–024F	208
01B0	ư	Ʊ	Ʋ	Ƴ	ƴ	Ƶ	ƶ	Ʒ	Ƹ	ƹ	ƺ	ƻ	Ƽ	ƽ	ƾ	ƿ	Latin Extended-B; 0180–024F	208
01C0	ǀ	ǁ	ǂ	ǃ	Ǆ	ǅ	ǆ	Ǉ	ǈ	ǉ	Ǌ	ǋ	ǌ	Ǎ	ǎ	Ǐ	Latin Extended-B; 0180–024F	208
01D0	ǐ	Ǒ	ǒ	Ǔ	ǔ	Ǖ	ǖ	Ǘ	ǘ	Ǚ	ǚ	Ǜ	ǜ	ǝ	Ǟ	ǟ	Latin Extended-B; 0180–024F	208
01E0	Ǡ	ǡ	Ǣ	ǣ	Ǥ	ǥ	Ǧ	ǧ	Ǩ	ǩ	Ǫ	ǫ	Ǭ	ǭ	Ǯ	ǯ	Latin Extended-B; 0180–024F	208
01F0	ǰ	Ǳ	ǲ	ǳ	Ǵ	ǵ	Ƕ	Ƿ	Ǹ	ǹ	Ǻ	ǻ	Ǽ	ǽ	Ǿ	ǿ	Latin Extended-B; 0180–024F	208
0200	Ȁ	ȁ	Ȃ	ȃ	Ȅ	ȅ	Ȇ	ȇ	Ȉ	ȉ	Ȋ	ȋ	Ȍ	ȍ	Ȏ	ȏ	Latin Extended-B; 0180–024F	208
0210	Ȑ	ȑ	Ȓ	ȓ	Ȕ	ȕ	Ȗ	ȗ	Ș	ș	Ț	ț	Ȝ	ȝ	Ȟ	ȟ	Latin Extended-B; 0180–024F	208
0220	Ƞ	ȡ	Ȣ	ȣ	Ȥ	ȥ	Ȧ	ȧ	Ȩ	ȩ	Ȫ	ȫ	Ȭ	ȭ	Ȯ	ȯ	Latin Extended-B; 0180–024F	208
0230	Ȱ	ȱ	Ȳ	ȳ	ȴ	ȵ	ȶ	ȷ	ȸ	ȹ	Ⱥ	Ȼ	ȼ	Ƚ	Ⱦ	ȿ	Latin Extended-B; 0180–024F	208
0240	ɀ	Ɂ	ɂ	Ƀ	Ʉ	Ʌ	Ɇ	ɇ	Ɉ	ɉ	Ɋ	ɋ	Ɍ	ɍ	Ɏ	ɏ	Latin Extended-B; 0180–024F	208
0250	ɐ	ɑ	ɒ	ɓ	ɔ	ɕ	ɖ	ɗ	ɘ	ə	ɚ	ɛ	ɜ	ɝ	ɞ	ɟ	IPA Extensions; 0250–02AF	96
0260	ɠ	ɡ	ɢ	ɣ	ɤ	ɥ	ɦ	ɧ	ɨ	ɩ	ɪ	ɫ	ɬ	ɭ	ɮ	ɯ	IPA Extensions; 0250–02AF	96
0270	ɰ	ɱ	ɲ	ɳ	ɴ	ɵ	ɶ	ɷ	ɸ	ɹ	ɺ	ɻ	ɼ	ɽ	ɾ	ɿ	IPA Extensions; 0250–02AF	96
0280	ʀ	ʁ	ʂ	ʃ	ʄ	ʅ	ʆ	ʇ	ʈ	ʉ	ʊ	ʋ	ʌ	ʍ	ʎ	ʏ	IPA Extensions; 0250–02AF	96
0290	ʐ	ʑ	ʒ	ʓ	ʔ	ʕ	ʖ	ʗ	ʘ	ʙ	ʚ	ʛ	ʜ	ʝ	ʞ	ʟ	IPA Extensions; 0250–02AF	96
02A0	ʠ	ʡ	ʢ	ʣ	ʤ	ʥ	ʦ	ʧ	ʨ	ʩ	ʪ	ʫ	ʬ	ʭ	ʮ	ʯ	IPA Extensions; 0250–02AF	96
02B0	ʰ	ʱ	ʲ	ʳ	ʴ	ʵ	ʶ	ʷ	ʸ	ʹ	ʺ	ʻ	ʼ	ʽ	ʾ	ʿ	Spacing Modifier Letters; 02B0–02FF	14
02E0	ˠ	ˡ	ˢ	ˣ	ˤ	˥	˦	˧	˨	˩	˪	˫	ˬ	˭	ˮ	˯	Spacing Modifier Letters; 02B0–02FF	14
1D00	ᴀ	ᴁ	ᴂ	ᴃ	ᴄ	ᴅ	ᴆ	ᴇ	ᴈ	ᴉ	ᴊ	ᴋ	ᴌ	ᴍ	ᴎ	ᴏ	Phonetic Extensions; 1D00–1D7F	111
1D10	ᴐ	ᴑ	ᴒ	ᴓ	ᴔ	ᴕ	ᴖ	ᴗ	ᴘ	ᴙ	ᴚ	ᴛ	ᴜ	ᴝ	ᴞ	ᴟ	Phonetic Extensions; 1D00–1D7F	111
1D20	ᴠ	ᴡ	ᴢ	ᴣ	ᴤ	ᴥ	ᴦ	ᴧ	ᴨ	ᴩ	ᴪ	ᴫ	ᴬ	ᴭ	ᴮ	ᴯ	Phonetic Extensions; 1D00–1D7F	111
1D30	ᴰ	ᴱ	ᴲ	ᴳ	ᴴ	ᴵ	ᴶ	ᴷ	ᴸ	ᴹ	ᴺ	ᴻ	ᴼ	ᴽ	ᴾ	ᴿ	Phonetic Extensions; 1D00–1D7F	111
1D40	ᵀ	ᵁ	ᵂ	ᵃ	ᵄ	ᵅ	ᵆ	ᵇ	ᵈ	ᵉ	ᵊ	ᵋ	ᵌ	ᵍ	ᵎ	ᵏ	Phonetic Extensions; 1D00–1D7F	111
1D50	ᵐ	ᵑ	ᵒ	ᵓ	ᵔ	ᵕ	ᵖ	ᵗ	ᵘ	ᵙ	ᵚ	ᵛ	ᵜ	ᵝ	ᵞ	ᵟ	Phonetic Extensions; 1D00–1D7F	111
1D60	ᵠ	ᵡ	ᵢ	ᵣ	ᵤ	ᵥ	ᵦ	ᵧ	ᵨ	ᵩ	ᵪ	ᵫ	ᵬ	ᵭ	ᵮ	ᵯ	Phonetic Extensions; 1D00–1D7F	111
1D70	ᵰ	ᵱ	ᵲ	ᵳ	ᵴ	ᵵ	ᵶ	ᵷ	ᵸ	ᵹ	ᵺ	ᵻ	ᵼ	ᵽ	ᵾ	ᵿ	Phonetic Extensions; 1D00–1D7F	111
1D80	ᶀ	ᶁ	ᶂ	ᶃ	ᶄ	ᶅ	ᶆ	ᶇ	ᶈ	ᶉ	ᶊ	ᶋ	ᶌ	ᶍ	ᶎ	ᶏ	Phonetic Extensions Supplement; 1D80–1DBF	63
1D90	ᶐ	ᶑ	ᶒ	ᶓ	ᶔ	ᶕ	ᶖ	ᶗ	ᶘ	ᶙ	ᶚ	ᶛ	ᶜ	ᶝ	ᶞ	ᶟ	Phonetic Extensions Supplement; 1D80–1DBF	63
1DA0	ᶠ	ᶡ	ᶢ	ᶣ	ᶤ	ᶥ	ᶦ	ᶧ	ᶨ	ᶩ	ᶪ	ᶫ	ᶬ	ᶭ	ᶮ	ᶯ	Phonetic Extensions Supplement; 1D80–1DBF	63
1DB0	ᶰ	ᶱ	ᶲ	ᶳ	ᶴ	ᶵ	ᶶ	ᶷ	ᶸ	ᶹ	ᶺ	ᶻ	ᶼ	ᶽ	ᶾ	ᶿ	Phonetic Extensions Supplement; 1D80–1DBF	63
1E00	Ḁ	ḁ	Ḃ	ḃ	Ḅ	ḅ	Ḇ	ḇ	Ḉ	ḉ	Ḋ	ḋ	Ḍ	ḍ	Ḏ	ḏ	Latin Extended Additional; 1E00–1EFF	256
1E10	Ḑ	ḑ	Ḓ	ḓ	Ḕ	ḕ	Ḗ	ḗ	Ḙ	ḙ	Ḛ	ḛ	Ḝ	ḝ	Ḟ	ḟ	Latin Extended Additional; 1E00–1EFF	256
1E20	Ḡ	ḡ	Ḣ	ḣ	Ḥ	ḥ	Ḧ	ḧ	Ḩ	ḩ	Ḫ	ḫ	Ḭ	ḭ	Ḯ	ḯ	Latin Extended Additional; 1E00–1EFF	256
1E30	Ḱ	ḱ	Ḳ	ḳ	Ḵ	ḵ	Ḷ	ḷ	Ḹ	ḹ	Ḻ	ḻ	Ḽ	ḽ	Ḿ	ḿ	Latin Extended Additional; 1E00–1EFF	256
1E40	Ṁ	ṁ	Ṃ	ṃ	Ṅ	ṅ	Ṇ	ṇ	Ṉ	ṉ	Ṋ	ṋ	Ṍ	ṍ	Ṏ	ṏ	Latin Extended Additional; 1E00–1EFF	256
1E50	Ṑ	ṑ	Ṓ	ṓ	Ṕ	ṕ	Ṗ	ṗ	Ṙ	ṙ	Ṛ	ṛ	Ṝ	ṝ	Ṟ	ṟ	Latin Extended Additional; 1E00–1EFF	256
1E60	Ṡ	ṡ	Ṣ	ṣ	Ṥ	ṥ	Ṧ	ṧ	Ṩ	ṩ	Ṫ	ṫ	Ṭ	ṭ	Ṯ	ṯ	Latin Extended Additional; 1E00–1EFF	256
1E70	Ṱ	ṱ	Ṳ	ṳ	Ṵ	ṵ	Ṷ	ṷ	Ṹ	ṹ	Ṻ	ṻ	Ṽ	ṽ	Ṿ	ṿ	Latin Extended Additional; 1E00–1EFF	256
1E80	Ẁ	ẁ	Ẃ	ẃ	Ẅ	ẅ	Ẇ	ẇ	Ẉ	ẉ	Ẋ	ẋ	Ẍ	ẍ	Ẏ	ẏ	Latin Extended Additional; 1E00–1EFF	256
1E90	Ẑ	ẑ	Ẓ	ẓ	Ẕ	ẕ	ẖ	ẗ	ẘ	ẙ	ẚ	ẛ	ẜ	ẝ	ẞ	ẟ	Latin Extended Additional; 1E00–1EFF	256
1EA0	Ạ	ạ	Ả	ả	Ấ	ấ	Ầ	ầ	Ẩ	ẩ	Ẫ	ẫ	Ậ	ậ	Ắ	ắ	Latin Extended Additional; 1E00–1EFF	256
1EB0	Ằ	ằ	Ẳ	ẳ	Ẵ	ẵ	Ặ	ặ	Ẹ	ẹ	Ẻ	ẻ	Ẽ	ẽ	Ế	ế	Latin Extended Additional; 1E00–1EFF	256
1EC0	Ề	ề	Ể	ể	Ễ	ễ	Ệ	ệ	Ỉ	ỉ	Ị	ị	Ọ	ọ	Ỏ	ỏ	Latin Extended Additional; 1E00–1EFF	256
1ED0	Ố	ố	Ồ	ồ	Ổ	ổ	Ỗ	ỗ	Ộ	ộ	Ớ	ớ	Ờ	ờ	Ở	ở	Latin Extended Additional; 1E00–1EFF	256
1EE0	Ỡ	ỡ	Ợ	ợ	Ụ	ụ	Ủ	ủ	Ứ	ứ	Ừ	ừ	Ử	ử	Ữ	ữ	Latin Extended Additional; 1E00–1EFF	256
1EF0	Ự	ự	Ỳ	ỳ	Ỵ	ỵ	Ỷ	ỷ	Ỹ	ỹ	Ỻ	ỻ	Ỽ	ỽ	Ỿ	ỿ	Latin Extended Additional; 1E00–1EFF	256
2070	⁰	ⁱ			⁴	⁵	⁶	⁷	⁸	⁹	⁺	⁻	⁼	⁽	⁾	ⁿ	Superscripts and Subscripts; 2070–209F	18
2090	ₐ	ₑ	ₒ	ₓ	ₔ	ₕ	ₖ	ₗ	ₘ	ₙ	ₚ	ₛ	ₜ	₝	₞	₟	Superscripts and Subscripts; 2070–209F	18
2120	℠	℡	™	℣	ℤ	℥	Ω	℧	ℨ	℩	K	Å	ℬ	ℭ	℮	ℯ	Letterlike symbols 2100–214F	4
2130	ℰ	ℱ	Ⅎ	ℳ	ℴ	ℵ	ℶ	ℷ	ℸ	ℹ	℺	℻	ℼ	ℽ	ℾ	ℿ	Letterlike symbols 2100–214F	4
2140	⅀	⅁	⅂	⅃	⅄	ⅅ	ⅆ	ⅇ	ⅈ	ⅉ	⅊	⅋	⅌	⅍	ⅎ	⅏	Letterlike symbols 2100–214F	4
2160	Ⅰ	Ⅱ	Ⅲ	Ⅳ	Ⅴ	Ⅵ	Ⅶ	Ⅷ	Ⅸ	Ⅹ	Ⅺ	Ⅻ	Ⅼ	Ⅽ	Ⅾ	Ⅿ	Number Forms; 2150–218F	41
2170	ⅰ	ⅱ	ⅲ	ⅳ	ⅴ	ⅵ	ⅶ	ⅷ	ⅸ	ⅹ	ⅺ	ⅻ	ⅼ	ⅽ	ⅾ	ⅿ	Number Forms; 2150–218F	41
2180	ↀ	ↁ	ↂ	Ↄ	ↄ	ↅ	ↆ	ↇ	ↈ	↉	↊	↋					Number Forms; 2150–218F	41
2C60	Ⱡ	ⱡ	Ɫ	Ᵽ	Ɽ	ⱥ	ⱦ	Ⱨ	ⱨ	Ⱪ	ⱪ	Ⱬ	ⱬ	Ɑ	Ɱ	Ɐ	Latin Extended-C; 2C60–2C7F	32
2C70	Ɒ	ⱱ	Ⱳ	ⱳ	ⱴ	Ⱶ	ⱶ	ⱷ	ⱸ	ⱹ	ⱺ	ⱻ	ⱼ	ⱽ	Ȿ	Ɀ	Latin Extended-C; 2C60–2C7F	32
A720	꜠	꜡	Ꜣ	ꜣ	Ꜥ	ꜥ	Ꜧ	ꜧ	Ꜩ	ꜩ	Ꜫ	ꜫ	Ꜭ	ꜭ	Ꜯ	ꜯ	Latin Extended-D; A720–A7FF	201
A730	ꜰ	ꜱ	Ꜳ	ꜳ	Ꜵ	ꜵ	Ꜷ	ꜷ	Ꜹ	ꜹ	Ꜻ	ꜻ	Ꜽ	ꜽ	Ꜿ	ꜿ	Latin Extended-D; A720–A7FF	201
A740	Ꝁ	ꝁ	Ꝃ	ꝃ	Ꝅ	ꝅ	Ꝇ	ꝇ	Ꝉ	ꝉ	Ꝋ	ꝋ	Ꝍ	ꝍ	Ꝏ	ꝏ	Latin Extended-D; A720–A7FF	201
A750	Ꝑ	ꝑ	Ꝓ	ꝓ	Ꝕ	ꝕ	Ꝗ	ꝗ	Ꝙ	ꝙ	Ꝛ	ꝛ	Ꝝ	ꝝ	Ꝟ	ꝟ	Latin Extended-D; A720–A7FF	201
A760	Ꝡ	ꝡ	Ꝣ	ꝣ	Ꝥ	ꝥ	Ꝧ	ꝧ	Ꝩ	ꝩ	Ꝫ	ꝫ	Ꝭ	ꝭ	Ꝯ	ꝯ	Latin Extended-D; A720–A7FF	201
A770	ꝰ	ꝱ	ꝲ	ꝳ	ꝴ	ꝵ	ꝶ	ꝷ	ꝸ	Ꝺ	ꝺ	Ꝼ	ꝼ	Ᵹ	Ꝿ	ꝿ	Latin Extended-D; A720–A7FF	201
A780	Ꞁ	ꞁ	Ꞃ	ꞃ	Ꞅ	ꞅ	Ꞇ	ꞇ	ꞈ	꞉	꞊	Ꞌ	ꞌ	Ɥ	ꞎ	ꞏ	Latin Extended-D; A720–A7FF	201
A790	Ꞑ	ꞑ	Ꞓ	ꞓ	ꞔ	ꞕ	Ꞗ	ꞗ	Ꞙ	ꞙ	Ꞛ	ꞛ	Ꞝ	ꞝ	Ꞟ	ꞟ	Latin Extended-D; A720–A7FF	201
A7A0	Ꞡ	ꞡ	Ꞣ	ꞣ	Ꞥ	ꞥ	Ꞧ	ꞧ	Ꞩ	ꞩ	Ɦ	Ɜ	Ɡ	Ɬ	Ɪ	ꞯ	Latin Extended-D; A720–A7FF	201
A7B0	Ʞ	Ʇ	Ʝ	Ꭓ	Ꞵ	ꞵ	Ꞷ	ꞷ	Ꞹ	ꞹ	Ꞻ	ꞻ	Ꞽ	ꞽ	Ꞿ	ꞿ	Latin Extended-D; A720–A7FF	201
A7C0	Ꟁ	ꟁ	Ꟃ	ꟃ	Ꞔ	Ʂ	Ᶎ	Ꟈ	ꟈ	Ꟊ	ꟊ	Ɤ	Ꟍ	ꟍ	꟎	꟏	Latin Extended-D; A720–A7FF	201
A7D0	Ꟑ	ꟑ	꟒	ꟓ	꟔	ꟕ	Ꟗ	ꟗ	Ꟙ	ꟙ	Ꟛ	ꟛ	Ƛ	꟝			Latin Extended-D; A720–A7FF	201
A7E0			꟢														Latin Extended-D; A720–A7FF	201
A7F0		꟱	ꟲ	ꟳ	ꟴ	Ꟶ	ꟶ	ꟷ	ꟸ	ꟹ	ꟺ	ꟻ	ꟼ	ꟽ	ꟾ	ꟿ	Latin Extended-D; A720–A7FF	201
AB30	ꬰ	ꬱ	ꬲ	ꬳ	ꬴ	ꬵ	ꬶ	ꬷ	ꬸ	ꬹ	ꬺ	ꬻ	ꬼ	ꬽ	ꬾ	ꬿ	Latin Extended-E; AB30–AB6F	58
AB40	ꭀ	ꭁ	ꭂ	ꭃ	ꭄ	ꭅ	ꭆ	ꭇ	ꭈ	ꭉ	ꭊ	ꭋ	ꭌ	ꭍ	ꭎ	ꭏ	Latin Extended-E; AB30–AB6F	58
AB50	ꭐ	ꭑ	ꭒ	ꭓ	ꭔ	ꭕ	ꭖ	ꭗ	ꭘ	ꭙ	ꭚ	꭛	ꭜ	ꭝ	ꭞ	ꭟ	Latin Extended-E; AB30–AB6F	58
AB60	ꭠ	ꭡ	ꭢ	ꭣ	ꭤ	ꭥ	ꭦ	ꭧ	ꭨ	ꭩ	꭪	꭫	꭬	꭭			Latin Extended-E; AB30–AB6F	58
FB00	ﬀ	ﬁ	ﬂ	ﬃ	ﬄ	ﬅ	ﬆ										Alphabetic Presentation Forms	7
FF20	＠	Ａ	Ｂ	Ｃ	Ｄ	Ｅ	Ｆ	Ｇ	Ｈ	Ｉ	Ｊ	Ｋ	Ｌ	Ｍ	Ｎ	Ｏ	Halfwidth and Fullwidth Forms (fullwidth Latin letters); FF00–FFEF	52
FF30	Ｐ	Ｑ	Ｒ	Ｓ	Ｔ	Ｕ	Ｖ	Ｗ	Ｘ	Ｙ	Ｚ	［	＼	］	＾	＿	Halfwidth and Fullwidth Forms (fullwidth Latin letters); FF00–FFEF	52
FF40	｀	ａ	ｂ	ｃ	ｄ	ｅ	ｆ	ｇ	ｈ	ｉ	ｊ	ｋ	ｌ	ｍ	ｎ	ｏ	Halfwidth and Fullwidth Forms (fullwidth Latin letters); FF00–FFEF	52
FF50	ｐ	ｑ	ｒ	ｓ	ｔ	ｕ	ｖ	ｗ	ｘ	ｙ	ｚ	｛	｜	｝	～	｟	Halfwidth and Fullwidth Forms (fullwidth Latin letters); FF00–FFEF	52
10780	𐞀	𐞁	𐞂	𐞃	𐞄	𐞅		𐞇	𐞈	𐞉	𐞊	𐞋	𐞌	𐞍	𐞎	𐞏	Latin Extended-F; 10780–107BF	62
10790	𐞐	𐞑	𐞒	𐞓	𐞔	𐞕	𐞖	𐞗	𐞘	𐞙	𐞚	𐞛	𐞜	𐞝	𐞞	𐞟	Latin Extended-F; 10780–107BF	62
107A0	𐞠	𐞡	𐞢	𐞣	𐞤	𐞥	𐞦	𐞧	𐞨	𐞩	𐞪	𐞫	𐞬	𐞭	𐞮	𐞯	Latin Extended-F; 10780–107BF	62
107B0	𐞰		𐞲	𐞳	𐞴	𐞵	𐞶	𐞷	𐞸	𐞹	𐞺	𐞻	𐞼	𐞽	𐞾	𐞿	Latin Extended-F; 10780–107BF	62
1DF00	𝼀	𝼁	𝼂	𝼃	𝼄	𝼅	𝼆	𝼇	𝼈	𝼉	𝼊	𝼋	𝼌	𝼍	𝼎	𝼏	Latin Extended-G; 1DF00–1DFFF	186
1DF10	𝼐	𝼑	𝼒	𝼓	𝼔	𝼕	𝼖	𝼗	𝼘	𝼙	𝼚	𝼛	𝼜	𝼝	𝼞	𝼟	Latin Extended-G; 1DF00–1DFFF	186
1DF20	𝼠	𝼡	𝼢	𝼣	𝼤	𝼥	𝼦	𝼧	𝼨	𝼩	𝼪	𝼫	𝼬	𝼭	𝼮	𝼯	Latin Extended-G; 1DF00–1DFFF	186
1DF30	𝼰	𝼱	𝼲	𝼳	𝼴	𝼵	𝼶	𝼷	𝼸	𝼹	𝼺	𝼻	𝼼	𝼽	𝼾	𝼿	Latin Extended-G; 1DF00–1DFFF	186
1DF40	𝽀	𝽁	𝽂	𝽃	𝽄	𝽅	𝽆	𝽇	𝽈	𝽉	𝽊	𝽋	𝽌	𝽍	𝽎	𝽏	Latin Extended-G; 1DF00–1DFFF	186
1DF50	𝽐	𝽑	𝽒	𝽓	𝽔	𝽕	𝽖	𝽗	𝽘	𝽙	𝽚	𝽛	𝽜	𝽝	𝽞	𝽟	Latin Extended-G; 1DF00–1DFFF	186
1DF60	𝽠	𝽡	𝽢	𝽣	𝽤	𝽥	𝽦	𝽧	𝽨	𝽩	𝽪	𝽫	𝽬	𝽭	𝽮	𝽯	Latin Extended-G; 1DF00–1DFFF	186
1DF70	𝽰	𝽱	𝽲	𝽳	𝽴	𝽵	𝽶	𝽷	𝽸	𝽹	𝽺	𝽻	𝽼	𝽽	𝽾	𝽿	Latin Extended-G; 1DF00–1DFFF	186
1DF80	𝾀	𝾁															Latin Extended-G; 1DF00–1DFFF	186
1DF90	𝾐	𝾑	𝾒	𝾓	𝾔	𝾕	𝾖										Latin Extended-G; 1DF00–1DFFF	186
1DFA0																	Latin Extended-G; 1DF00–1DFFF	186
1DFB0																	Latin Extended-G; 1DF00–1DFFF	186
1DFC0														𝿍	𝿎	𝿏	Latin Extended-G; 1DF00–1DFFF	186
1DFD0	𝿐	𝿑	𝿒	𝿓	𝿔	𝿕	𝿖	𝿗	𝿘	𝿙	𝿚	𝿛	𝿜	𝿝	𝿞	𝿟	Latin Extended-G; 1DF00–1DFFF	186
1DFE0	𝿠	𝿡	𝿢	𝿣	𝿤	𝿥	𝿦	𝿧	𝿨	𝿩	𝿪	𝿫	𝿬	𝿭	𝿮	𝿯	Latin Extended-G; 1DF00–1DFFF	186
1DFF0	𝿰	𝿱	𝿲	𝿳	𝿴	𝿵	𝿶	𝿷	𝿸	𝿹	𝿺	𝿻	𝿼	𝿽	𝿾	𝿿	Latin Extended-G; 1DF00–1DFFF	186
Total characters																		1,653

== See also ==
- Universal Character Set characters
- Letterlike Symbols (Unicode block)
- List of Latin-script letters
- List of Latin letters by shape
- Mathematical Alphanumeric Symbols
- European Unicode subset (DIN 91379)
