= List of precomposed Latin characters in Unicode =

This is a list of precomposed Latin characters in Unicode. Unicode typefaces may be needed for these to display correctly.

== Letters with diacritics ==
	Aa	Ææ	Bb	Cc	Dd	Ee	Ff	Gg	Hh	Ii	Jj	Kk	Ll	Mm	Nn	Oo	Øø	Pp	Qq	Rr	Ssſ	Tt	Uu	Vv	Ww	Xx	Yy	Zz	Ʒʒ
acute	Áá	Ǽǽ		Ćć		Éé		Ǵǵ		Íí		Ḱḱ	Ĺĺ	Ḿḿ	Ńń	Óó	Ǿǿ	Ṕṕ		Ŕŕ	Śś		Úú		Ẃẃ		Ýý	Źź	
acute and dot above																					Ṥṥ								
breve	Ăă					Ĕĕ		Ğğ		Ĭĭ						Ŏŏ							Ŭŭ						
breve and acute	Ắắ																												
breve and dot below	Ặặ																												
breve and grave	Ằằ																												
breve and hook above	Ẳẳ																												
breve and tilde	Ẵẵ																												
breve below									Ḫḫ																				
caron	Ǎǎ			Čč	Ďď	Ěě		Ǧǧ	Ȟȟ	Ǐǐ	ǰ	Ǩǩ	Ľľ		Ňň	Ǒǒ				Řř	Šš	Ťť	Ǔǔ					Žž	Ǯǯ
caron and dot above																					Ṧṧ								
cedilla				Çç	Ḑḑ	Ȩȩ		Ģģ	Ḩḩ			Ķķ	Ļļ		Ņņ					Ŗŗ	Şş	Ţţ							
cedilla and acute				Ḉḉ																									
cedilla and breve						Ḝḝ																							
circumflex	Ââ			Ĉĉ		Êê		Ĝĝ	Ĥĥ	Îî	Ĵĵ					Ôô					Ŝŝ		Ûû		Ŵŵ		Ŷŷ	Ẑẑ	
circumflex and acute	Ấấ					Ếế										Ốố													
circumflex and dot below	Ậậ					Ệệ										Ộộ													
circumflex and grave	Ầầ					Ềề										Ồồ													
circumflex and hook above	Ẩẩ					Ểể										Ổổ													
circumflex and tilde	Ẫẫ					Ễễ										Ỗỗ													
circumflex below					Ḓḓ	Ḙḙ							Ḽḽ		Ṋṋ							Ṱṱ	Ṷṷ						
comma below																					Șș	Țț							
diaeresis	Ää					Ëë			Ḧḧ	Ïï						Öö						ẗ	Üü		Ẅẅ	Ẍẍ	Ÿÿ		
diaeresis and acute										Ḯḯ													Ǘǘ						
diaeresis and caron																							Ǚǚ						
diaeresis and grave																							Ǜǜ						
diaeresis and macron	Ǟǟ															Ȫȫ							Ǖǖ						
diaeresis below																							Ṳṳ						
dot above	Ȧȧ		Ḃḃ	Ċċ	Ḋḋ	Ėė	Ḟḟ	Ġġ	Ḣḣ	İ				Ṁṁ	Ṅṅ	Ȯȯ		Ṗṗ		Ṙṙ	Ṡṡẛ	Ṫṫ			Ẇẇ	Ẋẋ	Ẏẏ	Żż	
dot above and macron	Ǡǡ															Ȱȱ													
dot below	Ạạ		Ḅḅ		Ḍḍ	Ẹẹ			Ḥḥ	Ịị		Ḳḳ	Ḷḷ	Ṃṃ	Ṇṇ	Ọọ				Ṛṛ	Ṣṣ	Ṭṭ	Ụụ	Ṿṿ	Ẉẉ		Ỵỵ	Ẓẓ	
dot below and dot above																					Ṩṩ								
dot below and macron													Ḹḹ							Ṝṝ									
double acute																Őő							Űű						
double grave	Ȁȁ					Ȅȅ				Ȉȉ						Ȍȍ				Ȑȑ			Ȕȕ						
grave	Àà					Èè				Ìì					Ǹǹ	Òò							Ùù		Ẁẁ		Ỳỳ		
hook above	Ảả					Ẻẻ				Ỉỉ						Ỏỏ							Ủủ				Ỷỷ		
horn																Ơơ							Ưư						
horn and acute																Ớớ							Ứứ						
horn and dot below																Ợợ							Ựự						
horn and grave																Ờờ							Ừừ						
horn and hook above																Ởở							Ửử						
horn and tilde																Ỡỡ							Ữữ						
inverted breve	Ȃȃ					Ȇȇ				Ȋȋ						Ȏȏ				Ȓȓ			Ȗȗ						
macron	Āā	Ǣǣ				Ēē		Ḡḡ		Īī						Ōō							Ūū				Ȳȳ		
macron and acute						Ḗḗ										Ṓṓ													
macron and diaeresis																							Ṻṻ						
macron and grave						Ḕḕ										Ṑṑ													
macron below			Ḇḇ		Ḏḏ				ẖ			Ḵḵ	Ḻḻ		Ṉṉ					Ṟṟ		Ṯṯ						Ẕẕ	
ogonek	Ąą					Ęę				Įį						Ǫǫ							Ųų						
ogonek and macron																Ǭǭ													
ring above	Åå																						Ůů		ẘ		ẙ		
ring above and acute	Ǻǻ																												
ring below	Ḁḁ																												
tilde	Ãã					Ẽẽ				Ĩĩ					Ññ	Õõ							Ũũ	Ṽṽ			Ỹỹ		
tilde and acute																Ṍṍ							Ṹṹ						
tilde and diaeresis																Ṏṏ													
tilde and macron																Ȭȭ													
tilde below						Ḛḛ				Ḭḭ													Ṵṵ						

== Digraphs and ligatures ==
- Ǳ, ǲ, ǳ
- Ǆ, ǅ, ǆ
- ﬀ
- ﬃ
- ﬄ
- ﬁ
- ﬂ
- Ĳ, ĳ
- Ǉ, ǈ, ǉ
- Ǌ, ǋ, ǌ
- ﬆ
- ﬅ

== Other characters ==
Name	Uppercase	Lowercase
angstrom sign	Å	
a with right half ring		ẚ
kelvin sign	K	
l with interpunct	Ŀ	ŀ
apostrophe n		ŉ
long s		ſ

A collection of precomposed Latin characters (mostly abbreviations of units of measurement) is also included in the CJK Compatibility and Enclosed CJK Letters and Months sections of Unicode, as are a set of precomposed Roman numerals; these characters are intended for use in East Asian languages and are not meant to be mixed with Latin languages. Several enclosed alphanumerics are also featured in Unicode.

Some characters in the Letterlike Symbols block can be substituted with characters in the ASCII range.

== See also ==
- Latin script
