= Latin Extended Additional =

- Range: U+1E00..U+1EFF (256 code points)
- Plane: BMP
- Scripts: Latin
- Major alphabets: Vietnamese alphabet; transliteration
- Assigned: 256 code points
- Unused: 0 reserved code points

Unicode Version History
- 1.1 (1993): 245 (+245)
- 2.0 (1996): 246 (+1)
- 5.1 (2008): 256 (+10)

Unicode documentation
- Code chart ∣ Web page

Latin Extended Additional is a Unicode block.

Almost all characters (as many as 246) in this block are precomposed combinations of Latin letters with one or more general diacritical marks. Ninety of the characters are used in the Vietnamese alphabet. There are also a few Medievalist characters.

== Latin extended additional table ==
The following table shows the contents of the block:

Code	Result	Description
Latin General Use Extensions
U+1E00	Ḁ	Latin Capital Letter A with ring below
U+1E01	ḁ	Latin Small Letter A with ring below
U+1E02	Ḃ	Latin Capital Letter B with dot above
U+1E03	ḃ	Latin Small Letter B with dot above
U+1E04	Ḅ	Latin Capital Letter B with dot below
U+1E05	ḅ	Latin Small Letter B with dot below
U+1E06	Ḇ	Latin Capital Letter B with line below
U+1E07	ḇ	Latin Small Letter B with line below
U+1E08	Ḉ	Latin Capital Letter C with cedilla and acute
U+1E09	ḉ	Latin Small Letter C with cedilla and acute
U+1E0A	Ḋ	Latin Capital Letter D with dot above
U+1E0B	ḋ	Latin Small Letter D with dot above
U+1E0C	Ḍ	Latin Capital Letter D with dot below
U+1E0D	ḍ	Latin Small Letter D with dot below
U+1E0E	Ḏ	Latin Capital Letter D with line below
U+1E0F	ḏ	Latin Small Letter D with line below
U+1E10	Ḑ	Latin Capital Letter D with cedilla
U+1E11	ḑ	Latin Small Letter D with cedilla
U+1E12	Ḓ	Latin Capital Letter D with circumflex below
U+1E13	ḓ	Latin Small Letter D with circumflex below
U+1E14	Ḕ	Latin Capital Letter E with macron and grave
U+1E15	ḕ	Latin Small Letter E with macron and grave
U+1E16	Ḗ	Latin Capital Letter E with macron and acute
U+1E17	ḗ	Latin Small Letter E with macron and acute
U+1E18	Ḙ	Latin Capital Letter E with circumflex below
U+1E19	ḙ	Latin Small Letter E with circumflex below
U+1E1A	Ḛ	Latin Capital Letter E with tilde below
U+1E1B	ḛ	Latin Small Letter E with tilde below
U+1E1C	Ḝ	Latin Capital Letter E with cedilla and breve
U+1E1D	ḝ	Latin Small Letter E with cedilla and breve
U+1E1E	Ḟ	Latin Capital Letter F with dot above
U+1E1F	ḟ	Latin Small Letter F with dot above
U+1E20	Ḡ	Latin Capital Letter G with macron
U+1E21	ḡ	Latin Small Letter G with macron
U+1E22	Ḣ	Latin Capital Letter H with dot above
U+1E23	ḣ	Latin Small Letter H with dot above
U+1E24	Ḥ	Latin Capital Letter H with dot below
U+1E25	ḥ	Latin Small Letter H with dot below
U+1E26	Ḧ	Latin Capital Letter H with diaeresis
U+1E27	ḧ	Latin Small Letter H with diaeresis
U+1E28	Ḩ	Latin Capital Letter H with cedilla
U+1E29	ḩ	Latin Small Letter H with cedilla
U+1E2A	Ḫ	Latin Capital Letter H with breve below
U+1E2B	ḫ	Latin Small Letter H with breve below
U+1E2C	Ḭ	Latin Capital Letter I with tilde below
U+1E2D	ḭ	Latin Small Letter I with tilde below
U+1E2E	Ḯ	Latin Capital Letter I with diaeresis and acute
U+1E2F	ḯ	Latin Small Letter I with diaeresis and acute
U+1E30	Ḱ	Latin Capital Letter K with acute
U+1E31	ḱ	Latin Small Letter K with acute
U+1E32	Ḳ	Latin Capital Letter K with dot below
U+1E33	ḳ	Latin Small Letter K with dot below
U+1E34	Ḵ	Latin Capital Letter K with line below
U+1E35	ḵ	Latin Small Letter K with line below
U+1E36	Ḷ	Latin Capital Letter L with dot below
U+1E37	ḷ	Latin Small Letter L with dot below
U+1E38	Ḹ	Latin Capital Letter L with dot below and macron
U+1E39	ḹ	Latin Small Letter L with dot below and macron
U+1E3A	Ḻ	Latin Capital Letter L with line below
U+1E3B	ḻ	Latin Small Letter L with line below
U+1E3C	Ḽ	Latin Capital Letter L with circumflex below
U+1E3D	ḽ	Latin Small Letter L with circumflex below
U+1E3E	Ḿ	Latin Capital Letter M with acute
U+1E3F	ḿ	Latin Small Letter M with acute
U+1E40	Ṁ	Latin Capital Letter M with dot above
U+1E41	ṁ	Latin Small Letter M with dot above
U+1E42	Ṃ	Latin Capital Letter M with dot below
U+1E43	ṃ	Latin Small Letter M with dot below
U+1E44	Ṅ	Latin Capital Letter N with dot above
U+1E45	ṅ	Latin Small Letter N with dot above
U+1E46	Ṇ	Latin Capital Letter N with dot below
U+1E47	ṇ	Latin Small Letter N with dot below
U+1E48	Ṉ	Latin Capital Letter N with line below
U+1E49	ṉ	Latin Small Letter N with line below
U+1E4A	Ṋ	Latin Capital Letter N with circumflex below
U+1E4B	ṋ	Latin Small Letter N with circumflex below
U+1E4C	Ṍ	Latin Capital Letter O with tilde and acute
U+1E4D	ṍ	Latin Small Letter O with tilde and acute
U+1E4E	Ṏ	Latin Capital Letter O with tilde and diaeresis
U+1E4F	ṏ	Latin Small Letter O with tilde and diaeresis
U+1E50	Ṑ	Latin Capital Letter O with macron and grave
U+1E51	ṑ	Latin Small Letter O with macron and grave
U+1E52	Ṓ	Latin Capital Letter O with macron and acute
U+1E53	ṓ	Latin Small Letter O with macron and acute
U+1E54	Ṕ	Latin Capital Letter P with acute
U+1E55	ṕ	Latin Small Letter P with acute
U+1E56	Ṗ	Latin Capital Letter P with dot above
U+1E57	ṗ	Latin Small Letter P with dot above
U+1E58	Ṙ	Latin Capital Letter R with dot above
U+1E59	ṙ	Latin Small Letter R with dot above
U+1E5A	Ṛ	Latin Capital Letter R with dot below
U+1E5B	ṛ	Latin Small Letter R with dot below
U+1E5C	Ṝ	Latin Capital Letter R with dot below and macron
U+1E5D	ṝ	Latin Small Letter R with dot below and macron
U+1E5E	Ṟ	Latin Capital Letter R with line below
U+1E5F	ṟ	Latin Small Letter R with line below
U+1E60	Ṡ	Latin Capital Letter S with dot above
U+1E61	ṡ	Latin Small Letter S with dot above
U+1E62	Ṣ	Latin Capital Letter S with dot below
U+1E63	ṣ	Latin Small Letter S with dot below
U+1E64	Ṥ	Latin Capital Letter S with acute and dot above
U+1E65	ṥ	Latin Small Letter S with acute and dot above
U+1E66	Ṧ	Latin Capital Letter S with caron and dot above
U+1E67	ṧ	Latin Small Letter S with caron and dot above
U+1E68	Ṩ	Latin Capital Letter S with dot below and dot above
U+1E69	ṩ	Latin Small Letter S with dot below and dot above
U+1E6A	Ṫ	Latin Capital Letter T with dot above
U+1E6B	ṫ	Latin Small Letter T with dot above
U+1E6C	Ṭ	Latin Capital Letter T with dot below
U+1E6D	ṭ	Latin Small Letter T with dot below
U+1E6E	Ṯ	Latin Capital Letter T with line below
U+1E6F	ṯ	Latin Small Letter T with line below
U+1E70	Ṱ	Latin Capital Letter T with circumflex below
U+1E71	ṱ	Latin Small Letter T with circumflex below
U+1E72	Ṳ	Latin Capital Letter U with diaeresis below
U+1E73	ṳ	Latin Small Letter U with diaeresis below
U+1E74	Ṵ	Latin Capital Letter U with tilde below
U+1E75	ṵ	Latin Small Letter U with tilde below
U+1E76	Ṷ	Latin Capital Letter U with circumflex below
U+1E77	ṷ	Latin Small Letter U with circumflex below
U+1E78	Ṹ	Latin Capital Letter U with tilde and acute
U+1E79	ṹ	Latin Small Letter U with tilde and acute
U+1E7A	Ṻ	Latin Capital Letter U with macron and diaeresis
U+1E7B	ṻ	Latin Small Letter U with macron and diaeresis
U+1E7C	Ṽ	Latin Capital Letter V with tilde
U+1E7D	ṽ	Latin Small Letter V with tilde
U+1E7E	Ṿ	Latin Capital Letter V with dot below
U+1E7F	ṿ	Latin Small Letter V with dot below
U+1E80	Ẁ	Latin Capital Letter W with grave
U+1E81	ẁ	Latin Small Letter W with grave
U+1E82	Ẃ	Latin Capital Letter W with acute
U+1E83	ẃ	Latin Small Letter W with acute
U+1E84	Ẅ	Latin Capital Letter W with diaeresis
U+1E85	ẅ	Latin Small Letter W with diaeresis
U+1E86	Ẇ	Latin Capital Letter W with dot above
U+1E87	ẇ	Latin Small Letter W with dot above
U+1E88	Ẉ	Latin Capital Letter W with dot below
U+1E89	ẉ	Latin Small Letter W with dot below
U+1E8A	Ẋ	Latin Capital Letter X with dot above
U+1E8B	ẋ	Latin Small Letter X with dot above
U+1E8C	Ẍ	Latin Capital Letter X with diaeresis
U+1E8D	ẍ	Latin Small Letter X with diaeresis
U+1E8E	Ẏ	Latin Capital Letter Y with dot above
U+1E8F	ẏ	Latin Small Letter Y with dot above
U+1E90	Ẑ	Latin Capital Letter Z with circumflex
U+1E91	ẑ	Latin Small Letter Z with circumflex
U+1E92	Ẓ	Latin Capital Letter Z with dot below
U+1E93	ẓ	Latin Small Letter Z with dot below
U+1E94	Ẕ	Latin Capital Letter Z with line below
U+1E95	ẕ	Latin Small Letter Z with line below
U+1E96	ẖ	Latin Small Letter H with line below
U+1E97	ẗ	Latin Small Letter T with diaeresis
U+1E98	ẘ	Latin Small Letter W with ring above
U+1E99	ẙ	Latin Small Letter Y with ring above
U+1E9A	ẚ	Latin Small Letter A with right half ring
U+1E9B	ẛ	Latin Small Letter Long S with dot above
Medievalist additions
U+1E9C	ẜ	Latin Small Letter Long S with diagonal stroke
U+1E9D	ẝ	Latin Small Letter Long S with high stroke
Addition for German typography
U+1E9E	ẞ	Latin Capital Letter Sharp S
Medievalist addition
U+1E9F	ẟ	Latin Small Letter Delta
Additional letters for Vietnamese
U+1EA0	Ạ	Latin Capital Letter A with dot below
U+1EA1	ạ	Latin Small Letter A with dot below
U+1EA2	Ả	Latin Capital Letter A with hook above
U+1EA3	ả	Latin Small Letter A with hook above
U+1EA4	Ấ	Latin Capital Letter A with circumflex and acute
U+1EA5	ấ	Latin Small Letter A with circumflex and acute
U+1EA6	Ầ	Latin Capital Letter A with circumflex and grave
U+1EA7	ầ	Latin Small Letter A with circumflex and grave
U+1EA8	Ẩ	Latin Capital Letter A with circumflex and hook above
U+1EA9	ẩ	Latin Small Letter A with circumflex and hook above
U+1EAA	Ẫ	Latin Capital Letter A with circumflex and tilde
U+1EAB	ẫ	Latin Small Letter A with circumflex and tilde
U+1EAC	Ậ	Latin Capital Letter A with circumflex and dot below
U+1EAD	ậ	Latin Small Letter A with circumflex and dot below
U+1EAE	Ắ	Latin Capital Letter A with breve and acute
U+1EAF	ắ	Latin Small Letter A with breve and acute
U+1EB0	Ằ	Latin Capital Letter A with breve and grave
U+1EB1	ằ	Latin Small Letter A with breve and grave
U+1EB2	Ẳ	Latin Capital Letter A with breve and hook above
U+1EB3	ẳ	Latin Small Letter A with breve and hook above
U+1EB4	Ẵ	Latin Capital Letter A with breve and tilde
U+1EB5	ẵ	Latin Small Letter A with breve and tilde
U+1EB6	Ặ	Latin Capital Letter A with breve and dot below
U+1EB7	ặ	Latin Small Letter A with breve and dot below
U+1EB8	Ẹ	Latin Capital Letter E with dot below
U+1EB9	ẹ	Latin Small Letter E with dot below
U+1EBA	Ẻ	Latin Capital Letter E with hook above
U+1EBB	ẻ	Latin Small Letter E with hook above
U+1EBC	Ẽ	Latin Capital Letter E with tilde
U+1EBD	ẽ	Latin Small Letter E with tilde
U+1EBE	Ế	Latin Capital Letter E with circumflex and acute
U+1EBF	ế	Latin Small Letter E with circumflex and acute
U+1EC0	Ề	Latin Capital Letter E with circumflex and grave
U+1EC1	ề	Latin Small Letter E with circumflex and grave
U+1EC2	Ể	Latin Capital Letter E with circumflex and hook above
U+1EC3	ể	Latin Small Letter E with circumflex and hook above
U+1EC4	Ễ	Latin Capital Letter E with circumflex and tilde
U+1EC5	ễ	Latin Small Letter E with circumflex and tilde
U+1EC6	Ệ	Latin Capital Letter E with circumflex and dot below
U+1EC7	ệ	Latin Small Letter E with circumflex and dot below
U+1EC8	Ỉ	Latin Capital Letter I with hook above
U+1EC9	ỉ	Latin Small Letter I with hook above
U+1ECA	Ị	Latin Capital Letter I with dot below
U+1ECB	ị	Latin Small Letter I with dot below
U+1ECC	Ọ	Latin Capital Letter O with dot below
U+1ECD	ọ	Latin Small Letter O with dot below
U+1ECE	Ỏ	Latin Capital Letter O with hook above
U+1ECF	ỏ	Latin Small Letter O with hook above
U+1ED0	Ố	Latin Capital Letter O with circumflex and acute
U+1ED1	ố	Latin Small Letter O with circumflex and acute
U+1ED2	Ồ	Latin Capital Letter O with circumflex and grave
U+1ED3	ồ	Latin Small Letter O with circumflex and grave
U+1ED4	Ổ	Latin Capital Letter O with circumflex and hook above
U+1ED5	ổ	Latin Small Letter O with circumflex and hook above
U+1ED6	Ỗ	Latin Capital Letter O with circumflex and tilde
U+1ED7	ỗ	Latin Small Letter O with circumflex and tilde
U+1ED8	Ộ	Latin Capital Letter O with circumflex and dot below
U+1ED9	ộ	Latin Small Letter O with circumflex and dot below
U+1EDA	Ớ	Latin Capital Letter O with horn and acute
U+1EDB	ớ	Latin Small Letter O with horn and acute
U+1EDC	Ờ	Latin Capital Letter O with horn and grave
U+1EDD	ờ	Latin Small Letter O with horn and grave
U+1EDE	Ở	Latin Capital Letter O with horn and hook above
U+1EDF	ở	Latin Small Letter O with horn and hook above
U+1EE0	Ỡ	Latin Capital Letter O with horn and tilde
U+1EE1	ỡ	Latin Small Letter O with horn and tilde
U+1EE2	Ợ	Latin Capital Letter O with horn and dot below
U+1EE3	ợ	Latin Small Letter O with horn and dot below
U+1EE4	Ụ	Latin Capital Letter U with dot below
U+1EE5	ụ	Latin Small Letter U with dot below
U+1EE6	Ủ	Latin Capital Letter U with hook above
U+1EE7	ủ	Latin Small Letter U with hook above
U+1EE8	Ứ	Latin Capital Letter U with horn and acute
U+1EE9	ứ	Latin Small Letter U with horn and acute
U+1EEA	Ừ	Latin Capital Letter U with horn and grave
U+1EEB	ừ	Latin Small Letter U with horn and grave
U+1EEC	Ử	Latin Capital Letter U with horn and hook above
U+1EED	ử	Latin Small Letter U with horn and hook above
U+1EEE	Ữ	Latin Capital Letter U with horn and tilde
U+1EEF	ữ	Latin Small Letter U with horn and tilde
U+1EF0	Ự	Latin Capital Letter U with horn and dot below
U+1EF1	ự	Latin Small Letter U with horn and dot below
U+1EF2	Ỳ	Latin Capital Letter Y with grave
U+1EF3	ỳ	Latin Small Letter Y with grave
U+1EF4	Ỵ	Latin Capital Letter Y with dot below
U+1EF5	ỵ	Latin Small Letter Y with dot below
U+1EF6	Ỷ	Latin Capital Letter Y with hook above
U+1EF7	ỷ	Latin Small Letter Y with hook above
U+1EF8	Ỹ	Latin Capital Letter Y with tilde
U+1EF9	ỹ	Latin Small Letter Y with tilde
Medievalist additions
U+1EFA	Ỻ	Latin Capital Letter Middle-Welsh LL
U+1EFB	ỻ	Latin Small Letter Middle-Welsh LL
U+1EFC	Ỽ	Latin Capital Letter Middle-Welsh V
U+1EFD	ỽ	Latin Small Letter Middle-Welsh V
U+1EFE	Ỿ	Latin Capital Letter Y with loop
U+1EFF	ỿ	Latin Small Letter Y with loop

== Compact table ==
Latin Extended Additional^{[1]} Official Unicode Consortium code chart (PDF)
	0	1	2	3	4	5	6	7	8	9	A	B	C	D	E	F
U+1E0x	Ḁ	ḁ	Ḃ	ḃ	Ḅ	ḅ	Ḇ	ḇ	Ḉ	ḉ	Ḋ	ḋ	Ḍ	ḍ	Ḏ	ḏ
U+1E1x	Ḑ	ḑ	Ḓ	ḓ	Ḕ	ḕ	Ḗ	ḗ	Ḙ	ḙ	Ḛ	ḛ	Ḝ	ḝ	Ḟ	ḟ
U+1E2x	Ḡ	ḡ	Ḣ	ḣ	Ḥ	ḥ	Ḧ	ḧ	Ḩ	ḩ	Ḫ	ḫ	Ḭ	ḭ	Ḯ	ḯ
U+1E3x	Ḱ	ḱ	Ḳ	ḳ	Ḵ	ḵ	Ḷ	ḷ	Ḹ	ḹ	Ḻ	ḻ	Ḽ	ḽ	Ḿ	ḿ
U+1E4x	Ṁ	ṁ	Ṃ	ṃ	Ṅ	ṅ	Ṇ	ṇ	Ṉ	ṉ	Ṋ	ṋ	Ṍ	ṍ	Ṏ	ṏ
U+1E5x	Ṑ	ṑ	Ṓ	ṓ	Ṕ	ṕ	Ṗ	ṗ	Ṙ	ṙ	Ṛ	ṛ	Ṝ	ṝ	Ṟ	ṟ
U+1E6x	Ṡ	ṡ	Ṣ	ṣ	Ṥ	ṥ	Ṧ	ṧ	Ṩ	ṩ	Ṫ	ṫ	Ṭ	ṭ	Ṯ	ṯ
U+1E7x	Ṱ	ṱ	Ṳ	ṳ	Ṵ	ṵ	Ṷ	ṷ	Ṹ	ṹ	Ṻ	ṻ	Ṽ	ṽ	Ṿ	ṿ
U+1E8x	Ẁ	ẁ	Ẃ	ẃ	Ẅ	ẅ	Ẇ	ẇ	Ẉ	ẉ	Ẋ	ẋ	Ẍ	ẍ	Ẏ	ẏ
U+1E9x	Ẑ	ẑ	Ẓ	ẓ	Ẕ	ẕ	ẖ	ẗ	ẘ	ẙ	ẚ	ẛ	ẜ	ẝ	ẞ	ẟ
U+1EAx	Ạ	ạ	Ả	ả	Ấ	ấ	Ầ	ầ	Ẩ	ẩ	Ẫ	ẫ	Ậ	ậ	Ắ	ắ
U+1EBx	Ằ	ằ	Ẳ	ẳ	Ẵ	ẵ	Ặ	ặ	Ẹ	ẹ	Ẻ	ẻ	Ẽ	ẽ	Ế	ế
U+1ECx	Ề	ề	Ể	ể	Ễ	ễ	Ệ	ệ	Ỉ	ỉ	Ị	ị	Ọ	ọ	Ỏ	ỏ
U+1EDx	Ố	ố	Ồ	ồ	Ổ	ổ	Ỗ	ỗ	Ộ	ộ	Ớ	ớ	Ờ	ờ	Ở	ở
U+1EEx	Ỡ	ỡ	Ợ	ợ	Ụ	ụ	Ủ	ủ	Ứ	ứ	Ừ	ừ	Ử	ử	Ữ	ữ
U+1EFx	Ự	ự	Ỳ	ỳ	Ỵ	ỵ	Ỷ	ỷ	Ỹ	ỹ	Ỻ	ỻ	Ỽ	ỽ	Ỿ	ỿ
Notes 1.As of Unicode version 17.0

== History ==
The following Unicode-related documents record the purpose and process of defining specific characters in the Latin Extended Additional block:

Version	Final code points (Note: Proposed code points and characters names may differ from final code points and names)	Count	L2 ID	WG2 ID	Document
1.1	U+1E00..1E9A, 1EA0..1EF9	245			(to be determined)
2.0	U+1E9B	1		N1058	Everson, Michael (1994-08-23), Proposal for support of Irish Gaelic characters
2.0	U+1E9B	1		N1132R	Everson, Michael (1995-04-15), Revised Proposal Summary for document N1058, Proposal to ISO/IEC 10646-1 for support of Irish Gaelic characters
2.0	U+1E9B	1		N1203	Umamaheswaran, V. S.; Ksar, Mike (1995-05-03), "6.1.5.2", Unconfirmed minutes of SC2/WG2 Meeting 27, Geneva
2.0	U+1E9B	1	X3L2/95-090	N1253 (doc, txt)	Umamaheswaran, V. S.; Ksar, Mike (1995-09-09), "6.4.7", Unconfirmed Minutes of WG 2 Meeting # 28 in Helsinki, Finland; 1995-06-26--27
2.0	U+1E9B	1		N1315	Updated Table of replies and national body feedback on pDAM7 - Additional characters (SC2 N2656), 1996-01-09
2.0	U+1E9B	1		N1353	Umamaheswaran, V. S.; Ksar, Mike (1996-06-25), "6.3", Draft minutes of WG2 Copenhagen Meeting # 30
2.0	U+1E9B	1		N1539	Table of Replies and Feedback on Amendment 7 – Hebrew etc., 1997-01-29
2.0	U+1E9B	1	L2/97-127	N1563	Paterson, Bruce (1997-05-27), Draft Report on JTC1 letter ballot on DAM No. 7 to ISO/IEC 10646-1 (33 additional characters)
2.0	U+1E9B	1		N1572	Paterson, Bruce (1997-06-23), Almost Final Text – DAM 7 – 33 additional characters
2.0	U+1E9B	1	L2/97-288	N1603	Umamaheswaran, V. S. (1997-10-24), "5.3.3", Unconfirmed Meeting Minutes, WG 2 Meeting # 33, Heraklion, Crete, Greece, 20 June – 4 July 1997
5.1	U+1E9C..1E9D, 1E9F, 1EFA..1EFF	9	L2/05-183	N2957	Everson, Michael; Haugen, Odd Einar; Emiliano, António; Pedro, Susana; Grammel, Florian; Baker, Peter; Stötzner, Andreas; Dohnicht, Marcus; Luft, Diana (2005-08-02), Preliminary proposal to add medievalist characters to the UCS
5.1	U+1E9C..1E9D, 1E9F, 1EFA..1EFF	9	L2/06-027	N3027	Everson, Michael; Baker, Peter; Emiliano, António; Grammel, Florian; Haugen, Odd Einar; Luft, Diana; Pedro, Susana; Schumacher, Gerd; Stötzner, Andreas (2006-01-30), Proposal to add Medievalist characters to the UCS
5.1	U+1E9C..1E9D, 1E9F, 1EFA..1EFF	9	L2/06-049		Pedro, Susana (2006-01-31), Letter of support for Medievalist letters (L2/06-027)
5.1	U+1E9C..1E9D, 1E9F, 1EFA..1EFF	9	L2/06-048		Emiliano, Antonio (2006-02-02), Letter of support for Medievalist letters (L2/06-027)
5.1	U+1E9C..1E9D, 1E9F, 1EFA..1EFF	9	L2/06-008R2		Moore, Lisa (2006-02-13), "C.14", UTC #106 Minutes
5.1	U+1E9C..1E9D, 1E9F, 1EFA..1EFF	9		N2953 (pdf, doc)	Umamaheswaran, V. S. (2006-02-16), "7.4.6", Unconfirmed minutes of WG 2 meeting 47, Sophia Antipolis, France; 2005-09-12/15
5.1	U+1E9C..1E9D, 1E9F, 1EFA..1EFF	9	L2/06-074R	N3039R	Feedback on N3027 Proposal to add Medievalist Characters, 2006-03-16
5.1	U+1E9C..1E9D, 1E9F, 1EFA..1EFF	9	L2/06-101	N3060	Feedback on N3027 "Proposal to add medievalist characters to the UCS", 2006-03-27
5.1	U+1E9C..1E9D, 1E9F, 1EFA..1EFF	9	L2/06-116	N3077	Everson, Michael; Baker, Peter; Emiliano, António; Grammel, Florian; Haugen, Odd Einar; Luft, Diana; Pedro, Susana; Schumacher, Gerd; Stötzner, Andreas (2006-03-31), Response to UTC/US contribution N3037R, "Feedback on N3027 Proposal to add medievalist characters"
5.1	U+1E9C..1E9D, 1E9F, 1EFA..1EFF	9	L2/06-108		Moore, Lisa (2006-05-25), "Consensus 107-C36", UTC #107 Minutes
5.1	U+1E9C..1E9D, 1E9F, 1EFA..1EFF	9		N3103 (pdf, doc)	Umamaheswaran, V. S. (2006-08-25), "M48.14", Unconfirmed minutes of WG 2 meeting 48, Mountain View, CA, USA; 2006-04-24/27
5.1	U+1E9C..1E9D, 1E9F, 1EFA..1EFF	9	L2/06-318	N3160	Response to Project Editor's contribution N3146, "Draft disposition of comments on SC2 N3875 (PDAM text for Amendment 3.2 to ISO/IEC 10646:2003)", 2006-09-21
5.1	U+1E9E	1	L2/04-395	N2888	Stötzner, Andreas (2004-11-10), Capital Double S: Proposal to the Unicode Consortium
5.1	U+1E9E	1	L2/07-157		Paulwitz, Thomas (2007-03-06), Standardisation of "Capital sharp-S"
5.1	U+1E9E	1	L2/07-108	N3227R	Proposal to encode Latin Capital Letter Sharp S, 2007-03-21
5.1	U+1E9E	1		N3353 (pdf, doc)	Umamaheswaran, V. S. (2007-10-10), "M51.3b", Unconfirmed minutes of WG 2 meeting 51 Hanzhou, China; 2007-04-24/27, "Improvement of the glyph for 1E9E"
5.1	U+1E9E	1	L2/07-156		Sievers, Jörn (2007-05-02), Proposal by the DIN working group "Encoded Character Sets" to the relevant ISO committee to encode an uppercase ß
5.1	U+1E9E	1	L2/07-149		Freytag, Asmus (2007-05-08), Uppercase Sharp S Issues
5.1	U+1E9E	1	L2/07-118R2		Moore, Lisa (2007-05-23), "Motion 111-M1", UTC #111 Minutes
5.1	U+1E9E	1	L2/07-268	N3253 (pdf, doc)	Umamaheswaran, V. S. (2007-07-26), "M50.18", Unconfirmed minutes of WG 2 meeting 50, Frankfurt-am-Main, Germany; 2007-04-24/27

== See also ==
- Vietnamese language and computers
