= Bookshelf Symbol 7 =

Typeface

- Category: Symbol
- Foundry: Ricoh
- Date released: c. 2003
- Sample

Bookshelf Symbol 7 is a typeface which was packaged with Microsoft Office 2003. It is a pi font encoding several less common variants of Roman letters (including a small subset of those used in the International Phonetic Alphabet), a few musical symbols and mathematical symbols, a few additional symbols (including torii), and a few rare or obscure kanji.

== Controversy ==
In late 2003, several customers contacted Microsoft about the inclusion of two swastikas in this font (one diagonal, one straight), complaining that they did not like having the font on their computers. After being informed of the issue, Microsoft contacted several Jewish organizations about the font.

In December 2003, Microsoft published a tool to remove the font from Microsoft Office, and Steven Sinofsky, Senior Vice President for Microsoft Office, issued a public apology on behalf of Microsoft for the inclusion of the swastikas. Microsoft Office product manager Simon Marks clarified that the font was based on a Japanese font set, and the inclusion of the swastikas was accidental.

In February 2004, Microsoft released a critical update (KB833407) for Microsoft Office 2003 to remove "unacceptable symbols" from this font. This update removed the two swastikas and a Star of David from this typeface. According to Microsoft Office product manager Simon Marks, the Star of David was removed from Bookshelf Symbol 7 due to its proximity to the swastikas, but remains in other fonts shipped by Microsoft.

The removed symbols are shown in the chart below at 0x7E, 0x86, and 0x74.

== Encoding ==
Bookshelf Symbol 7
	0	1	2	3	4	5	6	7	8	9	A	B	C	D	E	F
0x																
1x																
2x	SP	ǎ 01CE	ā́	bʼ	B́	C̀	D́	D̀	F́	f́	℉ 2109	Ǵ 01F4	G̀	H́	h́	ǐ 01D0
3x	ī́	Ḿ 1E3E	m̥	Ǹ 01F8	Ṕ 1E54	ṕ 1E55	P̀	Q́	q́	Q̀	S̀	T́	t́	T̀	ṭ 1E6D	V́
4x	V̀	X́	ȳ 0233	ɑ́	ɑ̀	ɑ̃	ɪ́	ɪ̀	ᴜ 1D1C	ᴜ́	ᴜ̀	ʌ́	ʌ̀	ə́	ə̀	ɚ́
5x	ɚ̀	ɔ́	ɔ̀	ɔ̃	ɛ̃	æ̀	œ́	œ̃	ʤ 02A4	ŋ 014B	1̇	3̇	4́	8́	－́	－̀
6x	〜́	〜̀	…́	♩ 2669	𝄐 1D110	𝄑 1D111	♮ 266E	𝅝 1D15D	𝄞 1D11E	𝄪 1D12A	(Note: Double barred dollar sign.) 0024	∓ 2213	≓ 2253	=⃥	↘ 2198	↗ 2197
7x	✓ 2713	┒ 2512	‴ 2034	┈ 2508	✡ (Note: Removed by KB833407.) 2721	⁂ 2042	(Note: Turned asterism, i.e. ⁂ upside down.)	♥ 2665	♠ 2660	⁀ 2040	‿ 203F	︷ FE37	悪⃝	善⃝	卐 (Note: Diagonal right-pointing swastika, similar in orientation and rotation to the thick grotesque type-style form used by Nazi Germany. Removed by KB833407.)	
8x	ヘ (Note: Resembles 〽 but with only one peak.)	〽 303D	﹅ FE45	◦ 25E6	• 2022	⛩ 26E9	卐 (Note: Unicode U+0FD5 (halfwidth) or U+5350 (as a kanji). Possibly intended as a symbol for a Buddhist temple (especially given that it follows the ⛩ (torii) for a Shinto shrine), but the usual map symbol is the left-pointing 卍 (U+0FD6 or U+534D). Removed by KB833407.) 5350	𥝱 25771	𩺊 29E8A	焮 712E	莽 83BD	攲 6532	麽 9EBD	𩸽 29E3D	鯼 9BFC	〻 303B
9x	(Note: IDS ⿰虫⿱廿内. Resembles 蜗, but with 廿 instead of 口. It may be U+8739 蜹.)	汴 6C74	㕞 355E													
Ax																
Bx																
Cx																
Dx																
Ex																
Fx																
