= B' =

B' (B + apostrophe) may represent:

- Bʼ (B + modifier apostrophe), symbol for palatalised b in Slavic notation
- B′ (B + prime), symbolising bottomness in particle physics
- Β′ or β′ (Beta prime)

It is not to be confused with:

- B́ (B + acute accent)
- Ḃ (B + overdot)
- Bʻ (B + ʻokina)
- Bꞌ (B + saltillo)
- Bʾ (B + right half ring)
- Bʿ (B + left half ring)
