= V with hook =

Latin letter V with hook; used in some African alphabets and IPA

- Ʋ ʋ

Usage
- Writing system: Latin script
- Type: Alphabetic
- Sound values: [β]; [ʊ]; [ə]; [ʋ]; [u̙]
- In Unicode: U+01B2, U+028B

History
- Descendants: ᶹ

Other
- Writing direction: Left-to-Right

The letter V with hook (majuscule: Ʋ, minuscule: ʋ) is a Latin script character based on an italic form of V, although in modern typefaces it more closely resembles U.

== Usage ==
It is used in the orthographies of some African languages to represent the sound [β] (similar to the pronunciation of ⟨v⟩ in van but using only the lips), such as in Ewe, and formerly Shona from 1931 to 1955.

In Mossi (Mooré) and Phuie, it is used to represent the sound [ʊ], like the pronunciation of ⟨oo⟩ in foot.

In Kabiye and Ikposso it is used to represent the sound [u̙] ([u] with retracted tongue root), similar to the pronunciation of ⟨oo⟩ in food.

It is also used in the North American language Choctaw to represent the sound [ə] (often called schwa), like the pronunciation of ⟨a⟩ in above.

Its lowercase form, [ʋ], is used in the International Phonetic Alphabet for a voiced labiodental approximant.

Its Unicode code points are U+01B2 ("Latin capital letter V with hook") and U+028B ("Latin small letter V with hook"), respectively.

== Gallery ==
V hook as drawn in the African reference
alphabet of 1978

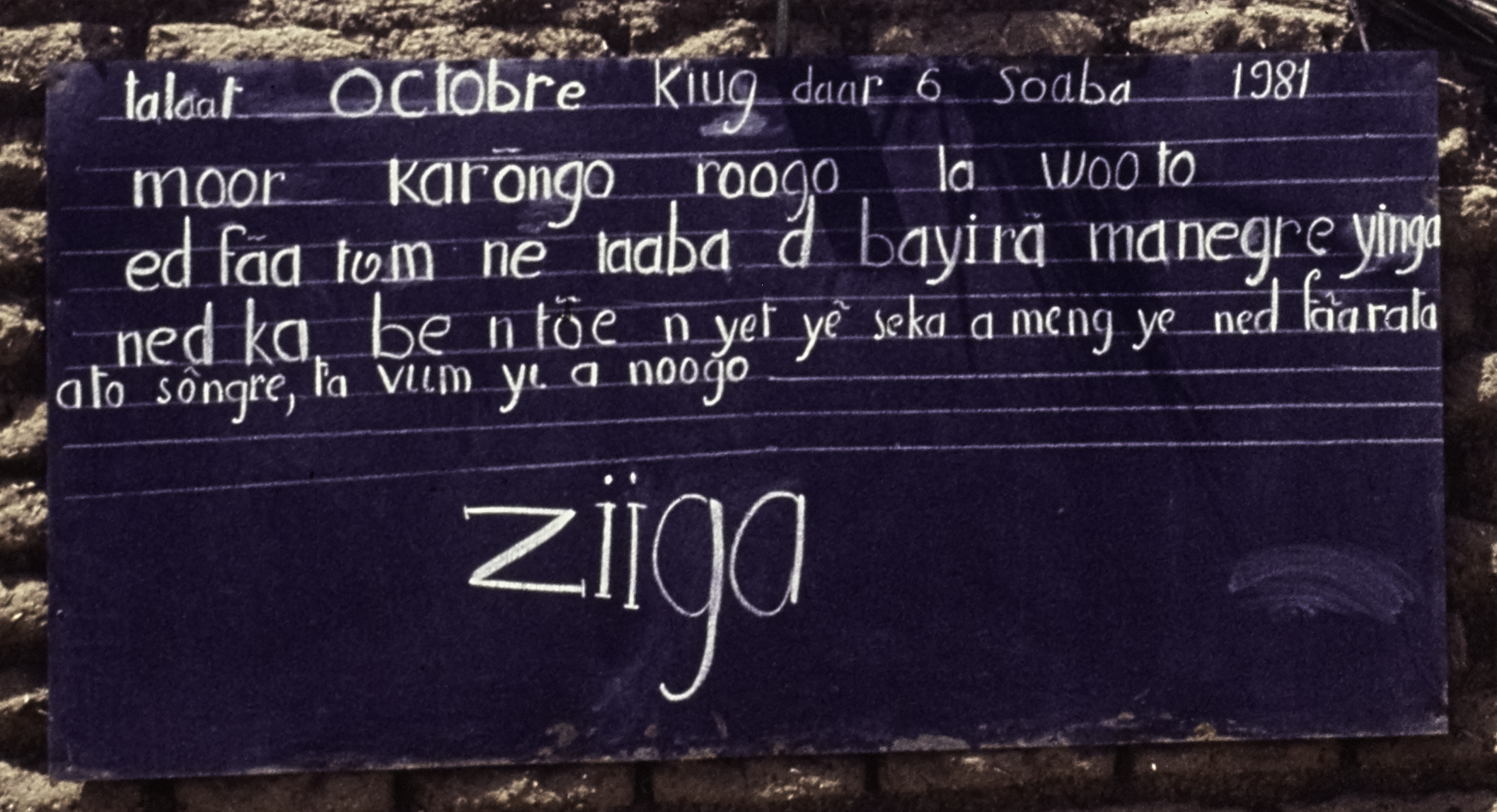
Mossi text using a letter V with hook (third line, ed fãa tʋm).

== See also ==
- Middle-Welsh V ⟨Ỽ, ỽ⟩
- Latin upsilon ⟨Ʊ, ʊ⟩
