= Ě =

Latin letter E with caron

Majuscule and minuscule ě.

The grapheme Ě, ě (E with caron) is used in the Czech, the Sorbian alphabets, in Pinyin, in Indonesian, in Javanese, in Sundanese and in Proto-Slavic notation.

== Czech ==
The letter ě is a vestige of Old-Czech palatalization. The originally-palatalizing phoneme, yat /ě/ [ʲɛ], became extinct and changed to [ɛ] or [jɛ], but it is preserved as a grapheme.

The letter never appears in the initial position, and its pronunciation depends on the preceding consonant:

- Dě, tě, ně [ɟɛ, cɛ, ɲɛ] is written instead of ďe, ťe, ňe (analogously to di, ti, ni).
- Bě, pě, vě, fě is written instead of bje, pje, vje, fje. Nevertheless, some words (vjezd, "entry, drive-in"; objem, "volume") are written with bje, vje because –je- is part of the etymological root of the word, preceded by the prefix v- or ob-.
- Mě [mɲɛ] is written instead of mňe. For etymological reasons, mně is written in some words (jemný, "soft" -> jemně, "softly").

== Serbo-Croatian ==
The grapheme is sometimes used in Serbo-Croatian to denote a jat (něsam, věra, lěpo, pověst, tělo). It is pronounced in different ways depending on the dialect: Ekavian (nesam, vera, lepo, povest, telo), Ikavian (nisam, vira, lipo, povist, tilo) or Ijekavian (nijesam, vjera, lijepo, povijest, tijelo). Historically its use was very widespread, but it gradually lost favour to combined j and e graphemes and was eventually dropped from the Gaj's Latin alphabet. It is found only in scientific and historically-accurate literature.

== Interslavic ==
In Interslavic, the letter is the Latin alphabet rendition of the etymological yat, with the assigned sound equivalent to the Czech pronunciation of /ě/. It is a palatalizing vowel. This vowel is the continuation of the Proto-Slavic *ě, and uses the same grapheme to preserve the tradition. The prescribed Cyrillic equivalent is Є, but the traditional yat symbol Ѣ ѣ has also seen occasional use.

== Chinese ==
=== Mandarin ===
Pinyin uses this ě (e caron), not the e breve (ĕ), to indicate the third tone of Mandarin Chinese.

=== Southern Min ===
Tâi-Lô use ě to indicate the sixth tone of Southern Min (Taiwanese).

== Indonesian ==
Indonesian uses ě (e caron), to indicate pěpět (schwa) ⟨ə⟩ as well as Javanese and Sundanese.

== Javanese ==
Javanese uses ě (e caron), to indicate pěpět (schwa) ⟨ə⟩.

== Sundanese ==
Like in Javanese, ě (e caron) in Sundanese also indicates pěpět (schwa) ⟨ə⟩.

== Encoding ==
Character information
Preview	Ě		ě	
Unicode name	LATIN CAPITAL LETTER E WITH CARON		LATIN SMALL LETTER E WITH CARON	
Encodings	decimal	hex	dec	hex
Unicode	282	U+011A	283	U+011B
UTF-8	196 154	C4 9A	196 155	C4 9B
Numeric character reference	&#282;	&#x11A;	&#283;	&#x11B;
Named character reference	&Ecaron;		&ecaron;	
ISO 8859-2	204	CC	236	EC

== Gallery ==
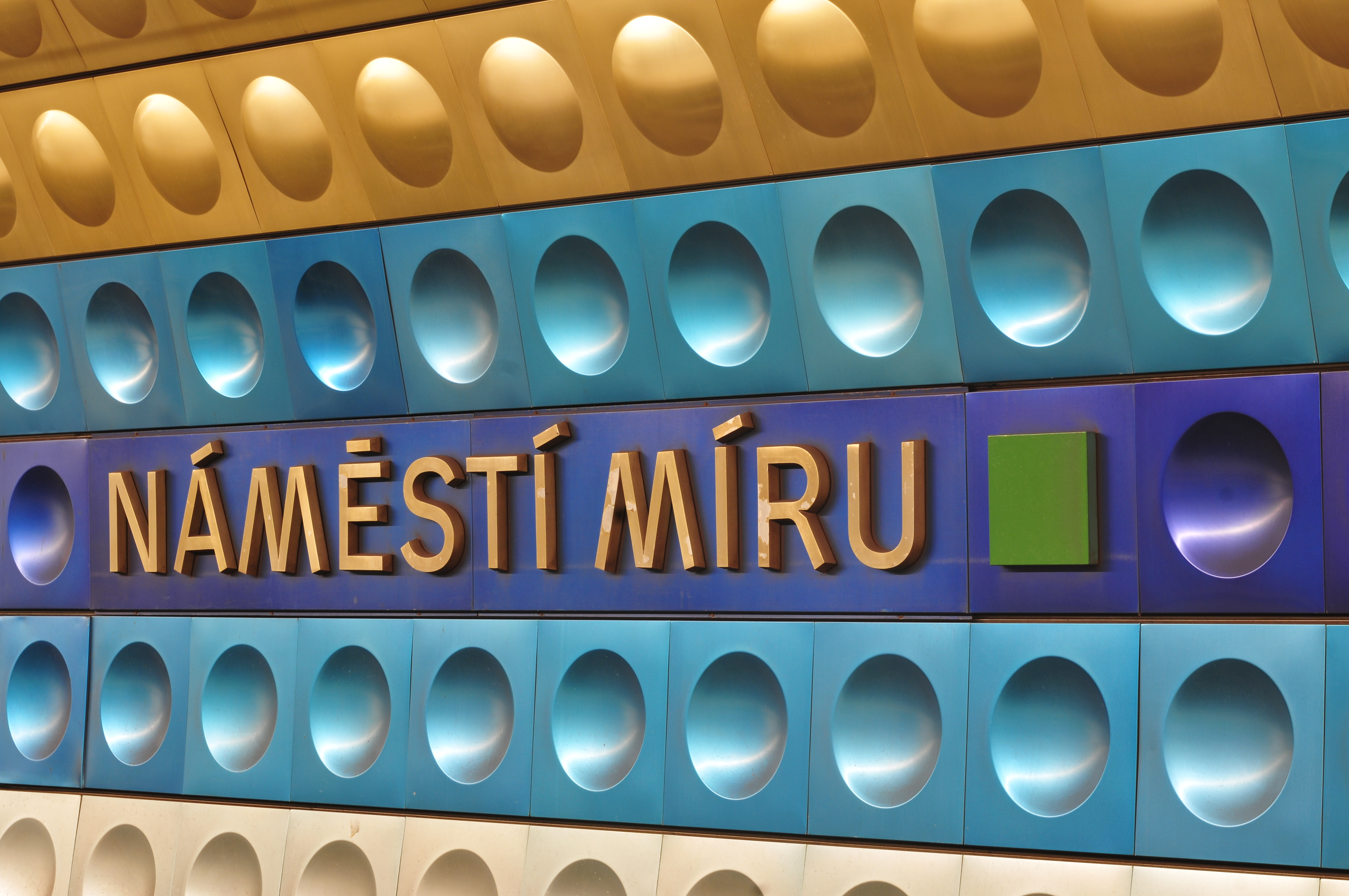
Náměstí Míru Prague Metro station
