= B́ =

Latin letter B with acute accent

B with acute
- B́ b́

Usage
- Writing system: Latin script

Other
- Writing direction: Left-to-Right

B with acute (uppercase: B́, lowercase: b́) is a letter of the Latin alphabet formed by addition of the acute accent over the letter B. It is used in Ntcham and Shinasha, and Võro. It was also formerly used in Upper Sorbian, Lower Sorbian and Polish.

== Usage ==
In Ntcham and Shinasha, <b́> is used to represent the phoneme /b/ with a high tone.

In Võro, the letter represents the palatalized voiced bilabial plosive /bʲ/. The letter was previously used for the same phoneme in the Upper Sorbian and Lower Sorbian languages, where it was replaced by the digraph <bj> as part of a 1948 orthographic reform, as well as in Jan Kochanowski's proposed 16th-century orthography for Polish.
