= Ý =

Latin letter Y with acute accent

- Ý ý

Usage
- Writing system: Latin
- Type: Alphabet
- Sound values: /i/ /iː/ /j/
- In Unicode: U+00DD, U+00FD

History
- Sisters: Y; Ȳ; Ŷ; Ÿ; Ẏ; Ỳ; Ỵ; Ỷ; Ỹ; ¥; Ⓨ; 🄨

Other
- Writing direction: Left-to-right

Ý (minuscule: ý), known as Y-acute, is a Latin-script character composed of the letter Y and an acute accent. It is found in Czech, Faroese, Icelandic, and the Turkmen alphabets, as well as romanizations of Russian. It is also used in Vietnamese as a borrowed letter pronounced with a rising high tone. It was previously used in Asturleonese, Old Norse, and Old Spanish.

== Usage ==
In Icelandic, Ý is the 29th letter of the alphabet, between Y and Þ. It is read as /i/ (short) or /iː/ (long).

In Turkmen, Ý represents the consonant /j/, as opposed to Y, which represents the vowel sound /ɯ/.

In Kazakh, Ý was suggested as a letter for the voiced labio-velar approximant [w] (as well as the diphthongs /ʊw/ and /ʉw/); the corresponding Cyrillic letter is У. The 2021 revision proposed the letter U, with the letter U with a macron (Ū) for the U sound in Kazakh.

In the Czech and Slovak languages it represents a long form of the vowel y and cannot occur in initial position. It is pronounced /iː/, the same as Í; ý used to represent a distinct sound until it merged with the sound of í by the 15th century. Today it is used to distinguish homophones, such as vít (to weave) and výt (to howl) in Czech.

In the Portuguese Language, the letter was used until 1911 in Portugal and 1947 in Brazil. Ý was used in words like: Proparoxýtona, Caýdos and Fýgo. Ý was later substituted by Í or Ì. Ý was used in words originating from the Greek Language.

In romanizations of the Russian language, Ý is used for Ы́, the letter Ы with a diacritic marking stress.

== Other uses ==
In Vietnamese, Ý means "Italy". The word is a shortened form of Ý Đại Lợi, which comes from Chinese 義大利 (Yìdàlì in Mandarin, a phonetic rendering of the country's name).

Ý does not exist in Modern Spanish, but the letter has persisted in proper names like Aýna, a municipality in Albacete, Spain, and Baý, a municipality in Laguna, Philippines, where it is pronounced as [i]. Ý was used in Early Modern Spanish, and it can be observed by some archaic spellings such as the name Ýñigo for Inigo or by the former spelling ýbamos for "íbamos" in older 16th–18th century Spanish writings.

== Character mappings ==
Character information
Preview	Ý		ý	
Unicode name	LATIN CAPITAL LETTER Y WITH ACUTE		LATIN SMALL LETTER Y WITH ACUTE	
Encodings	decimal	hex	dec	hex
Unicode	221	U+00DD	253	U+00FD
UTF-8	195 157	C3 9D	195 189	C3 BD
Numeric character reference	&#221;	&#xDD;	&#253;	&#xFD;
Named character reference	&Yacute;		&yacute;	
