= ᵵ =

Latin letter t with middle tilde

T with middle tilde ( ᵵ ) is a letter of the Latin script. At present, there is no uppercase version encoded in Unicode.

It is used in the International Phonetic Alphabet for a velarised or pharyngealised voiceless alveolar stop.

== Encoding ==
Character information
Preview	ᵵ	
Unicode name	LATIN SMALL LETTER T WITH MIDDLE TILDE	
Encodings	decimal	hex
Unicode	7541	U+1D75
UTF-8	225 181 181	E1 B5 B5
Numeric character reference	&#7541;	&#x1D75;
