= Y with loop =

Latin letter Y with loop

Ỿ
- Ỿ ỿ

Usage
- Writing system: Latin
- Type: Alphabet
- In Unicode: U+1EFE, U+1EFF

Ỿ (or ỿ) is a letter of the Latin alphabet. Its form is derived from the Latin letter Y (Y y) with the addition of a loop. It is used by some Welsh medievalists to indicate the schwa sound of ⟨y⟩.

Character information
Preview	Ỿ		ỿ	
Unicode name	LATIN CAPITAL LETTER Y WITH LOOP		LATIN SMALL LETTER Y WITH LOOP	
Encodings	decimal	hex	dec	hex
Unicode	7934	U+1EFE	7935	U+1EFF
UTF-8	225 187 190	E1 BB BE	225 187 191	E1 BB BF
Numeric character reference	&#7934;	&#x1EFE;	&#7935;	&#x1EFF;
