= Ȳ =

Latin letter Y with macron

- Ȳ ȳ

Usage
- Writing system: Latin
- Type: Alphabet
- Language of origin: Cornish
- Sound values: /yː/
- In Unicode: U+0232, U+0233

History
- Sisters: Y; Ý; Ŷ; Ÿ; Ẏ; Ỳ; Ỵ; Ỷ; Ỹ; ¥; Ⓨ; 🄨

Other
- Writing direction: Left-to-right

Ȳ (or ȳ) is a letter of the Latin alphabet. Its form is derived from the Latin letter Y (Y y) with the addition of a macron.

In modern dictionaries and textbooks for Latin and Old English, ȳ may be used to indicate a long "y" ([yː]). In Latin, this only occurs in loanwords. It is used in Cornish, and was used in Livonian.

== Unicode ==
Character information
Preview	Ȳ		ȳ	
Unicode name	LATIN CAPITAL LETTER Y WITH MACRON		LATIN SMALL LETTER Y WITH MACRON	
Encodings	decimal	hex	dec	hex
Unicode	562	U+0232	563	U+0233
UTF-8	200 178	C8 B2	200 179	C8 B3
Numeric character reference	&#562;	&#x232;	&#563;	&#x233;

== See also ==
- U with macron (Cyrillic) (Ӯ, ӯ) - a similar looking character
