= Lj (digraph) =

Letter found in Slavic languages

ǈ in titlecase and lowercase

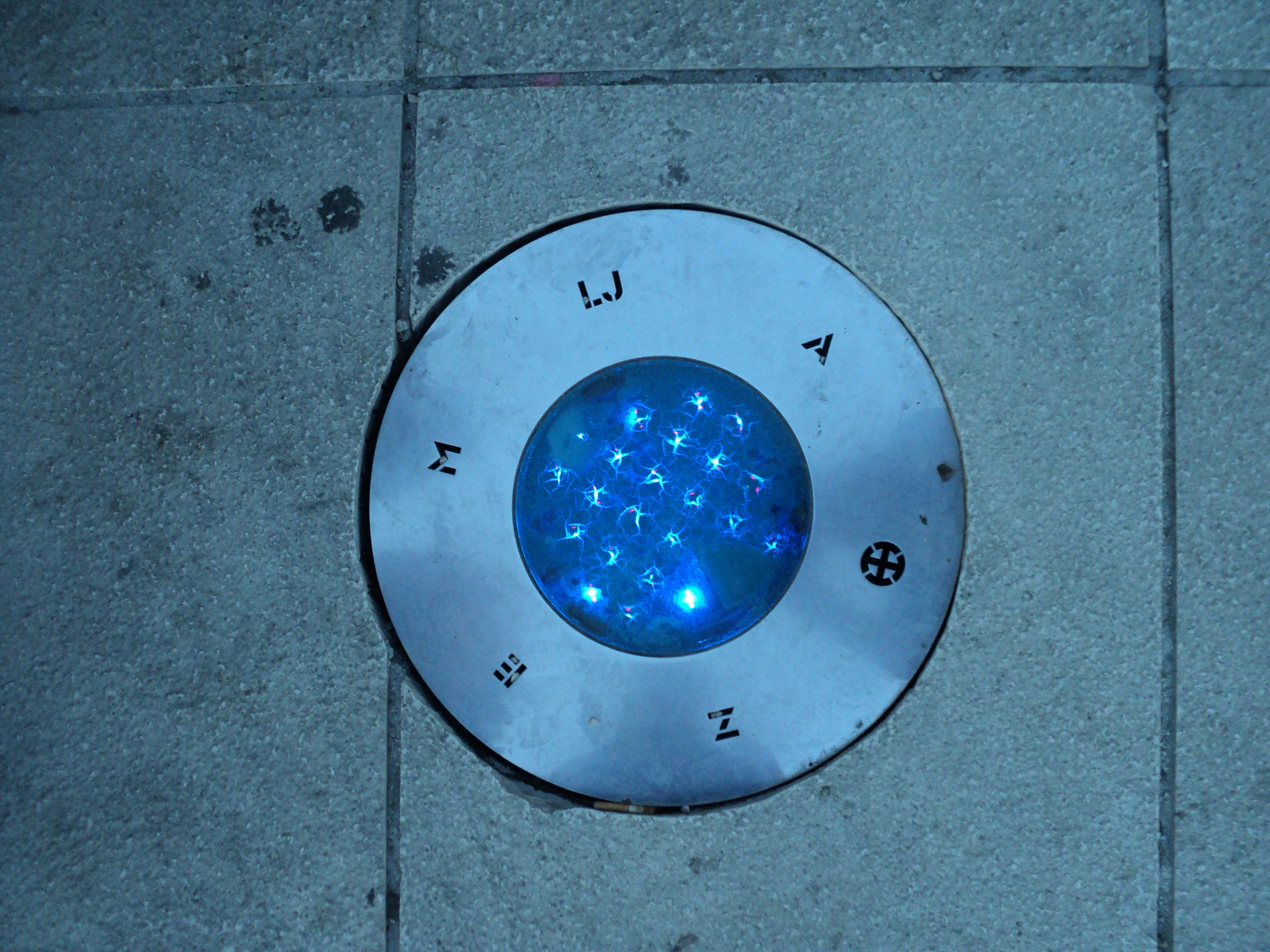
The digraph Ǉ in word ZEMǇA ("EARTH") is treated as a single letter (Croatian language).

ǈ (titlecase; Ǉ in upper case; ǉ in lower case) is a digraph present in orthographies of some Slavic languages, such as Gaj's Latin alphabet used by Serbo-Croatian and in romanised Macedonian, where it represents a palatal lateral approximant /ʎ/. For example, the word ljiljan is pronounced /ʎiʎan/. Most languages containing the letter ⟨ǈ⟩ in the alphabet are phonemic, which means that every symbol represents one sound, and is always pronounced the same way. In this case, joining the letters L and J creates a new letter or a sound. The digraph is treated as a single letter, and therefore it has its own place in the alphabet, takes up only one space in crossword puzzles and is written in line in vertical text. However, it is not found on standard computer keyboards. Like its Latin counterpart, the Cyrillic alphabet has a specific symbol for the same sound: Љ.

In sentence case and with proper nouns, only L is capitalized, while j is always written in lowercase unless the entire word or text appears in uppercase.

The same sound appears in Italian spelled with ⟨gl⟩, in some variants of Spanish and Catalan as ⟨ll⟩, in Portuguese as ⟨lh⟩, in Breton ⟨ilh⟩, in some Hungarian dialects as ⟨ly⟩ and in Latvian as ⟨ļ⟩. In Czech and Slovak, it is often transcribed as ⟨ľ⟩ (it is used more frequently on the latter language).

Ljudevit Gaj first proposed this digraph in 1835.

ǈ is a precomposed character with 3 variants:

- U+01C7 Ǉ LATIN CAPITAL LETTER LJ
- U+01C8 ǈ LATIN CAPITAL LETTER L WITH SMALL LETTER J
- U+01C9 ǉ LATIN SMALL LETTER LJ
- roughly \(1.016 \times 10^{1,292,913,991}\)

== See also ==
- Љ, the Cyrillic version of ǈ
- Gaj's Latin alphabet
