= Middle-Welsh v =

Middle Welsh letter

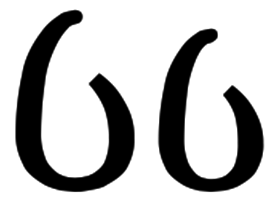
Uppercase and lowercase Middle Welsh V

The Middle Welsh V, depicted as Ỽ or ỽ, is a letter employed in Middle Welsh texts between the 13th and 14th centuries. It represented the sounds of v, u, and w and – prior to inclusion in the Latin Extended Additional block of Unicode characters – was typically represented by the letter w in transcriptions.

== Unicode ==
Character information
Preview	Ỽ		ỽ	
Unicode name	LATIN CAPITAL LETTER MIDDLE-WELSH V		LATIN SMALL LETTER MIDDLE-WELSH V	
Encodings	decimal	hex	dec	hex
Unicode	7932	U+1EFC	7933	U+1EFD
UTF-8	225 187 188	E1 BB BC	225 187 189	E1 BB BD
Numeric character reference	&#7932;	&#x1EFC;	&#7933;	&#x1EFD;
