= Latin delta =

Letter of the Latin alphabet

Latin delta (ẟ, lower-case only) is a Latin letter similar in appearance to the Greek lowercase letter delta (δ), but derived from the handwritten Latin lowercase d. It is also known as "script d" or "insular d" and is used in medieval Welsh transcriptions for the [ð] sound (English th in this) represented by "dd" in Modern Welsh. It is also used in the Cypriot Arabic alphabet, and Wakhi for the same purpose.

A proposal to include several medieval characters in the Universal Character Set included this character with the name LATIN SMALL LETTER SCRIPT D. This was renamed to LATIN SMALL LETTER DELTA and added to Unicode as U+1E9F when Unicode 5.1 was released on 4 April 2008.

U+018D ƍ LATIN SMALL LETTER TURNED DELTA is a former symbol in the International Phonetic Alphabet for a voiced "labialized" alveolar or dental fricative.
