= Sorbian alphabet =

Alphabet of the Sorbian languages

The Sorbian alphabet is based on the ISO basic Latin alphabet but uses diacritics such as the acute accent and the caron, making it similar to the Czech and Polish alphabets. (This mixture is also found in the Belarusian Latin alphabet.) The standard character encoding for the Sorbian alphabet is ISO 8859-2 (Latin-2).

The alphabet is used for the Sorbian languages, although some letters are used in only one of the two languages (Upper Sorbian and Lower Sorbian).

== Alphabet table ==
Upper case	HTML code	Lower case	HTML code	Name	Usual phonetic value	Other phonetic values	Comments
A		a		a	[a]		
B		b		bej	[b]	[p]	
C		c		cej	[ts]		
Č	&#268;	č	&#269;	čej	[tʃ]		
Ć	&#262;	ć	&#263;	ćet	[tɕ]	[dʑ]	
D		d		dej	[d]	[t]	
E		e		ej	[ɛ]		
Ě	&#282;	ě	&#283;	jět/ět (Upper), ět (Lower)	[iɪ]		
F		f		ef	[f]		
G		g		gej	[ɡ]		
H		h		ha	Upper [ʔ͡h] Lower [ʔ] or silent		
I		i		i	[i]		
J		j		jot/jót (Upper), jot (Lower)	[j]		
K		k		ka	[k]		
Ł	&#321;	ł	&#322;	eł	[w]		
L		l		el	[l]		
M		m		em	[m]		
N		n		en	[n]		
Ń	&#323;	ń	&#324;	eń (Upper), ejn (Lower)	[ɲ]		
O		o		o	[ɔ]		
Ó	&#211;	ó	&#243;	ót	Upper [uʊ] Lower [ɛ] or [ɨ]		
P		p		pej	[p]	[b]	
R		r		er	[ʁ]		
Ř	&#344;	ř	&#345;	eř	[ʃ]		Upper Sorbian only. Represents older r after a voiceless consonant and before a front vowel, e.g. přećel /ˈpʃɛt͡ɕɛl/ 'friend' from Proto-Slavic *prijateljь.
Ŕ	&#340;	ŕ	&#341;	ejŕ	[ʁʲ]		Lower Sorbian only
S		s		es	[s]	[z], [ɕ]	
Š	&#352;	š	&#353;	eš	[ʃ]		
Ś	&#346;	ś	&#347;	śej	[ɕ]	[ʑ]	Lower Sorbian only
T		t		tej	[t]	[d]	
U		u		u	[u]		
W		w		wej	Upper [v] Lower [w] or silent	Upper Sorbian [f]	
Y		y		y	[ɨ]		
Z		z		zet	[z]	[s], [ʑ]	
Ž	&#381;	ž	&#382;	žet	[ʒ]		
Ź	&#377;	ź	&#378;	źej	[ʑ]	[ɕ]	Lower Sorbian only (except as part of digraph dź)

An earlier version of the Lower Sorbian alphabet included the use of the letters b́ (or b’), ṕ (or p’), ḿ (or m’), ẃ (or w’) and rarely f́ (or f’) to indicate palatalized labials. These have been replaced by bj, pj, mj, wj, and fj.

Sorbian orthography also includes two digraphs:

Upper case	HTML code	Lower case	HTML code	Name	Usual phonetic value	Other phonetic values
Ch		ch		cha	Upper [kʰ] word/root initially; [x] otherwise Lower [x]	
Dź	D&#378;	dź	d&#378;	dźej/dźet	[dʑ]	[tɕ]

The digraph ch follows h in alphabetical order. These letters are used in foreign words and names:

Upper case	Lower case	Name	Usual phonetic value	Other phonetic values	Substitute letter(s)
Q	q	ku	[k]	[ɡ]	KW
V	v	fau	[v]	[f]	W
X	x	iks	[ks]	[ɡz]	KS
