= Ȧ =

Latin letter A with dot above

Latin A with dot above.

Ȧ (minuscule: ȧ) is a letter of the Latin alphabet, derived from A with the addition of a dot above the letter. It is occasionally used as a phonetic symbol for a low central vowel, /ä/. As a character in a computer file, it can be represented in the Unicode character encoding but not the standard ASCII character encoding. It was used in Harari romanization for a voiced pharyngeal fricative.

Character information
Preview	Ȧ		ȧ	
Unicode name	LATIN CAPITAL LETTER A WITH DOT ABOVE		LATIN SMALL LETTER A WITH DOT ABOVE	
Encodings	decimal	hex	dec	hex
Unicode	550	U+0226	551	U+0227
UTF-8	200 166	C8 A6	200 167	C8 A7
Numeric character reference	&#550;	&#x226;	&#551;	&#x227;
