= Ả =

Latin letter A with hook above

A with hook above
- Ả ả

Usage
- Writing system: Latin script
- Type: alphabetic
- Language of origin: Vietnamese language
- Sound values: [a˧˩˧]
- In Unicode: U+1EA2, U+1EA3

History
- Development: 𓃾: Α α; 𐌀; A a; Ả ả

Other
- Writing direction: Left-to-Right

A with hook above (majuscule: Ả, minuscule: ả) is a letter of the Latin alphabet formed by addition of the hook above diacritic to the letter A. It is used in the Vietnamese language.

== Usage ==
The letter is used in Vietnamese language, where it represents the open front unrounded vowel with falling-rising mid-tone (hỏi) ([a˧˩˧]).

== Encoding ==
Character information
Preview	Ả		ả	
Unicode name	LATIN CAPITAL LETTER A WITH HOOK ABOVE		LATIN SMALL LETTER A WITH HOOK ABOVE	
Encodings	decimal	hex	dec	hex
Unicode	7842	U+1EA2	7843	U+1EA3
UTF-8	225 186 162	E1 BA A2	225 186 163	E1 BA A3
Numeric character reference	&#7842;	&#x1EA2;	&#7843;	&#x1EA3;
