= Ṕ =

Latin letter P with acute accent

P with acute
- Ṕ ṕ

Usage
- Writing system: Latin script
- Type: alphabetic
- Language of origin: Washo; Chimane (Gill alphabet); Abkhaz language (ISO 9 romanization); Upper and Lower Sorbian (obsolete); Middle Polish (obsolete)
- Sound values: [pʼ], [pʰ], [pʲ] (formerly)
- In Unicode: 1E54 (uppercase), 1E55 (lowercase)

History
Development
D21
              - 𐌐
                - P p
                  - Ṕ ṕ
- Time period: 16th century to present

Other
- Writing direction: Left-to-Right

P with acute (majuscule: Ṕ, minuscule: ṕ) is a letter of the Latin alphabet formed by addition of the acute diacritic over the letter P. It is used in Washo, the Chimane alphabet by Wayne Gill, and in the ISO 9 romanization of Abkhaz language. In the past, it was used in Upper and Lower Sorbian and Middle Polish.

== Usage ==
In Washo, it represents the bilabial ejective stop ([pʼ]) sound.

In the ISO 9 romanization of Abkhaz language, the letter replaces pe with middle hook (majuscule: Ҧ, minuscule: ҧ), which is pronounced as aspirated voiceless bilabial plosive ([pʰ]) sound.

The letter appeared in the alphabet made by Jan Kochanowski for the Middle Polish language, that was used from 16th until 18th century. It represented the palatalized voiceless bilabial plosive ([pʲ]) sound.

== Bibliography ==
- ISO 9: 1995. Information et documentation — Translittération des caractères cyrilliques en caractères latins — Langues slaves et non slaves, Organisation internationale de normalisation, 1995.
- Georg Kral, Grammatik der Wendischen Sprache in der Oberlausitz, Bautzen, M. Schmaler, 1895.
- Josef Páta, Krátká příručka hornolužické srbštiny stručná mluvnice, rozhovory a korespondence, Prague, Adolf Černy, 1920.
- C. T. Pfuhl, Laut- und Formenlehre der oberlausitzisch-wendischen Sprache : mit besonderer Rücksicht auf das Altslawische, Bautzen, M. Schmaler, 1895.
- Jeanette Sake, A Grammar of Mosetén, Berlin/New York, Mouton de Gruyter, 2004, 504 p.
