= Ḿ =

Latin letter M with acute accent

Latin M with acute

Ḿ, ḿ (m-acute) is a letter in Chinese pinyin. In Chinese pinyin ḿ is the yángpíng tone (阳平, high-rising tone) of “m”. It was also used in an old version of the Sorbian alphabet and in older Polish.

This letter is also used in the Bube alphabet, a language from Equatorial Guinea. It is also used in Võro, a language of southern Estonia.

== Character mappings ==
Charset	Unicode
Majuscule Ḿ	U+1E3E
Minuscule ḿ	U+1E3F

== See also ==
- Acute accent
