= Ẑ =

Latin letter Z with circumflex

Z with circumflex
- Ẑ ẑ

Usage
- Writing system: Latin script
- Type: alphabetic
- Language of origin: ISO 9 Cyrillic transliteration, Poliespo, Tsilhqot'in
- Sound values: /ẕˤ/
- In Unicode: U+1E90, U+1E91

Ẑ is a Latin script letter, the letter Z with a circumflex, used for transliteration of the Cyrillic letter Ѕ in ISO 9 family of transliteration standards, and rarely used in Pinyin as a shorthand of zh. It is also used in Poliespo for the sound /kts/, and in the Tsilhqotʼin language to represent /zˤ/.

In mathematics, ẑ often refers to the unit vector in the +Z direction. In advanced mathematics, $\widehat{\mathbb{Z}}$ refers to the ring of profinite integers.
