= Ẋ =

Latin letter X with dot above

- Ẋ ẋ

Usage
- Writing system: Latin script
- Type: Alphabetic
- Language of origin: Chechen
- Sound values: /ħ/
- In Unicode: U+1E8A, U+1E8B

History
- Development: X x: Ẋ ẋ
- Transliterations: Хь

Ẋ (minuscule: ẋ) is a letter of the Latin alphabet, formed from X with the addition of a dot.

== Usage ==
=== Chechen ===
Ẋ is present in the Chechen Latin alphabet, created in the 1990s. The Cyrillic equivalent is Хь, which represents the voiceless pharyngeal fricative /ħ/.

== Computing code ==
Character information
Preview	Ẋ		ẋ	
Unicode name	LATIN CAPITAL LETTER X WITH DOT ABOVE		LATIN SMALL LETTER X WITH DOT ABOVE	
Encodings	decimal	hex	dec	hex
Unicode	7818	U+1E8A	7819	U+1E8B
UTF-8	225 186 138	E1 BA 8A	225 186 139	E1 BA 8B
Numeric character reference	&#7818;	&#x1E8A;	&#7819;	&#x1E8B;
