= Ḫ =

Latin letter H with breve below

H with breve below in Doulos SIL

Ḫ, ḫ (h with breve below) is a Latin letter used to transliterate:

- Arabic Ḫāʾ (خ) /x/
- Aramaic Ḫēt (𐡄) and (ח) /x/
- Akkadian /χ/
- Hittite laryngeal h, see Hittite cuneiform
- Egyptian x, see Egyptian hieroglyphs
- Geʽez letter ኀ (Ḫarm)
- Khalaj Latin alphabet
- Sumerian /x/
