= Ḉ =

Latin letter C with acute accent and cedilla

- Ḉ ḉ

Usage
- Writing system: Latin script
- Type: alphabetic
- Language of origin: Abkhaz language, Abaza language, Adyghe language, Ubykh language
- Sound values: [kʼ] or [t͡ʃʼ], [t͡ɕʼ] [t͡s]

History
Development
Z4
        - Ζ ζ
          - 𐌆
            - Z z
              - Ꝣ ꝣ
                - Ç ç
                  - Ḉ ḉ
- Transliterations: ЧӀ, Ҷ ҷ, КӀ

Ḉ (minuscule: ḉ) is a Latin script letter formed from C with added acute accent and cedilla.

== Usage ==
It is used in the Estonian KNAB transliteration standard when representing Cyrillic letters of several Northwest Caucasian languages. In transliteration of Abaza, it represents the letter ЧӀ. In transliteration of Abkhaz, it represents the letter Ҷ. In transliteration of Adyghe, it represents the digraph КӀ.

== Unicode ==
The Unicode codepoints are U+1E08 for the upper-case letter, and U+1E09 for the lower-case one.

Character information
Preview	Ḉ		ḉ	
Unicode name	LATIN CAPITAL LETTER C WITH CEDILLA AND ACUTE		LATIN SMALL LETTER C WITH CEDILLA AND ACUTE	
Encodings	decimal	hex	dec	hex
Unicode	7688	U+1E08	7689	U+1E09
UTF-8	225 184 136	E1 B8 88	225 184 137	E1 B8 89
Numeric character reference	&#7688;	&#x1E08;	&#7689;	&#x1E09;
