= Ṡ =

Latin letter S with dot above

Latin S with dot above

Ṡ u+1E60 (lowercase: ṡ u+1E61 or ẛ) is a letter of the extended Latin alphabet, formed by S with the addition of a dot above.

In Irish orthography, the dot was used only for ẛ and ṡ, while a following h was used for c, p, and t; lenition of other letters was not indicated. Later the two systems spread to the entire set of lenitable consonants and competed with each other. Eventually the standard practice was to use the dot when writing in Gaelic script and the following h when writing in antiqua. Thus, ċ and ch represent the same phonetic element in Modern Irish. This is also used to write in Hindustani Music for writing higher Sa also known as C4.

== Current usage ==
=== Emilian ===
Ṡ is used in the Emilian language to represent /z/ as opposed to /s/, e.g. faṡû [faˈzuː] 'beans' (Bolognese dialect).

== Gallery ==
Erste Group

== See also ==
- Ṣ
