= Ẓ =

Latin letter Z with dot below

Z with dot below
- Ẓ ẓ

Usage
- Writing system: Latin script
- Type: alphabetic
- Sound values: [zˤ]

History
- Transliterations: ظ

Ẓ (minuscule: ẓ) is a letter of the Latin alphabet, formed from Z with the addition of a dot below the letter.

It is used in the transcription of Afroasiatic languages, specifically:

- as transcription of the Arabic letter Ẓāʾ
- in the Berber Latin alphabet to represent /zˤ/ (an emphatic z)
