= Ḱ =

Latin letter K with acute accent

Latin K with acute

Ḱ ḱ (K with acute accent) is used in the following sense:

- transliteration of Cyrillic Kje (Ќ, ќ) that is used in Macedonian.
- /k̠ʷ/ in the Saanich orthography
- in the Santali Latin orthography
- transliteration of the Kharosthi script
- representing the Proto-Indo-European phoneme */kʲ/

== Encodings ==
Character information
Preview	Ḱ		ḱ	
Unicode name	LATIN CAPITAL LETTER K WITH ACUTE		LATIN SMALL LETTER K WITH ACUTE	
Encodings	decimal	hex	dec	hex
Unicode	7728	U+1E30	7729	U+1E31
UTF-8	225 184 176	E1 B8 B0	225 184 177	E1 B8 B1
Numeric character reference	&#7728;	&#x1E30;	&#7729;	&#x1E31;

The HTML codes are:

- &#7728; for Ḱ (upper case)
- &#7729; for ḱ (lower case)

The Unicode codepoints are U+1E30 for Ḱ and U+1E31 for ḱ.
