= Ǹ =

Latin letter N with grave accent

Latin N with grave

Ǹ, ǹ (n-grave) is a letter in the Yoruba language to place emphasis on the consonant; however, this rarely occurs. It is also part of the digraph ǹg in Hokkien Pe̍h-ōe-jī, which is used as a syllabic voiced velar nasal in the third tone (Chinese: 陰去; Pe̍h-ōe-jī: im-khì; lit. 'dark departing').

== Character mappings ==
Charset	Unicode
Upper case Ǹ	U+01F8
Lower case ǹ	U+01F9

== See also ==
- Grave accent
