= Ẃ =

Latin letter W with acute accent

W with acute
- Ẃ ẃ

Usage
- Writing system: Latin script
- Type: Alphabetic
- Language of origin: Lower Sorbian (obsolete); Middle Polish (obsolete); Welsh language
- Sound values: [vʲ] (formerly)
- In Unicode: U+1E82, U+1E83

Other
- Writing direction: Left-to-Right

W with acute (majuscule: Ẃ, minuscule: ẃ) is a letter of the Latin alphabet formed by addition of the acute diacritic over the letter W. In the past, it was used in Lower Sorbian and Middle Polish. Now it is used in the Welsh orthography as an accented form of w, e. g. gẃraidd 'manly'.

== Usage ==
The letter appeared in the alphabet made by Jan Kochanowski for Middle Polish, which was used from 16th until 18th century. It represented the palatalizated voiced labiodental fricative (vʲ) sound. It also was used in Lower Sorbian.

== Encoding ==
Character information
Preview	Ẃ		ẃ	
Unicode name	LATIN CAPITAL LETTER W WITH ACUTE		LATIN SMALL LETTER W WITH ACUTE	
Encodings	decimal	hex	dec	hex
Unicode	7810	U+1E82	7811	U+1E83
UTF-8	225 186 130	E1 BA 82	225 186 131	E1 BA 83
Numeric character reference	&#7810;	&#x1E82;	&#7811;	&#x1E83;

== Bibliography ==
- Georg Kral, Grammatik der Wendischen Sprache in der Oberlausitz, Bautzen, M. Schmaler, 1895.
- Josef Páta, Krátká příručka hornolužické srbštiny stručná mluvnice, rozhovory a korespondence, Praze, Adolf Černy, 1920.
- C. T. Pfuhl, Laut- und Formenlehre der oberlausitzisch-wendischen Sprache : mit besonderer Rücksicht auf das Altslawische, Bautzen, M. Schmaler, 1895.
