= Ă =

Latin letter A with breve

Latin A-breve.

Ă (upper case) or ă (lower case), usually referred to in English as A-breve, is a letter used in standard Romanian and Vietnamese orthographies. In Romanian, it is used to represent the mid-central unrounded vowel, while in Vietnamese it represents the short a sound. It is the second letter of the Romanian, Vietnamese, and the pre-1972 Malaysian alphabets, after A.

Ă/ă is also used in several languages for transliteration of the Bulgarian letter Ъ/ъ.

== Romanian ==
Letter ă in Romanian Braille

The sound represented in Romanian by ă is a mid-central vowel /ə/, i.e. schwa. Unlike in English, Catalan and French but like in Indonesian (using e rather than ă), the vowel can be stressed. There are words in which it is the only vowel, such as măr /mər/ ("apple") or văd /vəd/ ("I see"). Additionally, some words that also contain other vowels (i. e. polysyllabic) can have the stress on ă like cărțile /ˈkərt͡sile/ ("the books") and odăi /oˈdəj/ ("rooms"). Another grapheme <a> with diacritic in Romanian is <â>.

== Vietnamese ==
Ă is the 2nd letter of the Vietnamese alphabet and represents /ă/. Because Vietnamese is a tonal language this letter may have any one of the 5 tonal symbols above or below it (or even no accent at all, since the Vietnamese first tone is identified by the lack of accent marks, see also Vietnamese phonology): Ằ ằ, Ắ ắ, Ẳ ẳ, Ẵ ẵ, Ặ ặ.

== Malay ==
The sound represented in pre-1972 Malaysian orthography by ă is a vowel. It occurred in the final syllable of the root word such as lamă /lamə/ ("long", "old"), mată /matə/ ("eye"), and sană /sanə/ ("there"). The letter was replaced in 1972 with a in the New Rumi Spelling.

== Balinese ==
Ă or ă are used in Balinese romanization, e.g. Kabupatén Tăbăṅan (Tabanan Regency ).

== Pronunciation respelling for English ==
In some systems for Pronunciation respelling for English including American Heritage Dictionary notation, ă represents the short A sound, /æ/.

== Unicode ==
- U+0103 ă LATIN SMALL LETTER A WITH BREVE
- U+0102 Ă LATIN CAPITAL LETTER A WITH BREVE

== See also ==
- A with breve (Cyrillic), Cyrillic letter а with breve, visually indistinguishable
- Breve
