= Hook above =

Diacritical mark

◌̉o

Hook above
- U+0309 ̉ COMBINING HOOK ABOVE

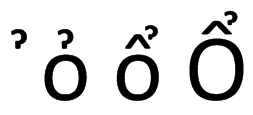
The hook in Times New Roman (top) and Calibri (bottom)

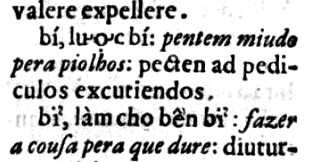
Alexandre de Rhodes's Dictionarium Annamiticum Lusitanum et Latinum (Vietnamese–Portuguese–Latin dictionary) showing bí without its tittle and bỉ with both a hook and tittle.

In typesetting, the hook above (Vietnamese: dấu hỏi) is a diacritic mark placed on top of vowels in the Vietnamese alphabet. In shape it looks like a tiny question mark without the dot underneath, or a tiny glottal stop ⟨ʔ⟩. For example, a capital A with a hook is "Ả", and a lower case "u" with a hook is "ủ". The hook is usually written to the right of the circumflex in conventional Vietnamese orthography. If Vietnamese characters are unavailable, it is often replaced by a question mark after the vowel (VIQR encoding).

This diacritic functions as a tone marker, indicating a "mid falling" tone (hỏi): which is "dipping" (˨˩˥) in Southern Vietnamese or "falling" (˧˩) in Northern Vietnamese; see Vietnamese language § Regional variation: Tones. The Southern "dipping" tone is similar to the questioning intonation in English.

The hook above can be used as a tone marker, but is not regarded as part of the alphabet.

== Letters with hook above ==
- Hook above ◌̉
  Vietnamese: Ả ả
- Ẩ ẩ
- Ẳ ẳ
- Ẻ ẻ
- Ể ể
- Ỉ ỉ
- Ỏ ỏ
- Ổ ổ
- Ở ở
- Ủ ủ
- Ử ử
- Ỷ ỷ

== Unicode ==
Apart from precomposed characters, in multiple scripts, the combining diacritical mark is encoded at U+0309 ̉ COMBINING HOOK ABOVE

== See also ==
- Horn (diacritic) (dấu móc)
- Hook (diacritic)
