= List of Latin-script alphabets =

The distribution of the Latin scripts. Countries where the Latin script is the main script Countries where Latin co-exists with other scripts

The lists and tables below summarize and compare the letter inventories of some of the Latin-script alphabets. In this article, the scope of the word "alphabet" is broadened to include letters with tone marks, and other diacritics used to represent a wide range of orthographic traditions, without regard to whether or how they are sequenced in their alphabet or the table.

Parentheses indicate characters not used in modern standard orthographies of the languages, but used in obsolete and/or dialectal forms.

== Letters contained in the ISO basic Latin alphabet ==
=== Alphabets that contain only ISO basic Latin letters ===
Among alphabets for natural languages the English,^{[36]} Indonesian, and Malay alphabets only use the 26 letters in both cases.

Among alphabets for constructed languages the Ido and Interlingua alphabets only use the 26 letters, while Toki Pona uses a 14-letter subset.

==== Extended by ligatures ====
- German (ß), Scandinavian (æ)

==== Extended by diacritical marks ====
- Spanish (ñ), German (ä, ö, and ü)

==== Extended by multigraphs ====
- Filipino (ng)
- Old French (ch)

=== Alphabets that contain all ISO basic Latin letters ===
Among alphabets for natural languages the Afrikaans,^{[54]} Aromanian, Azerbaijani (some dialects),^{[53]} Basque,^{[4]} Celtic British, Catalan,^{[6]} Cornish, Czech,^{[8]} Danish,^{[9]} Dutch,^{[10]} Emilian-Romagnol, Filipino,^{[11]} Finnish, French,^{[12]}, German,^{[13]} Greenlandic, Hmong, Hungarian,^{[15]} Irish,^{[16]} Javanese, Karakalpak,^{[23]} Kurdish, Modern Latin, Luxembourgish, Norwegian,^{[9]} Oromo^{[65]}, Papiamento^{[63]}, Polish,^{[22]} Portuguese, Quechua, Rhaeto-Romance, Romanian, Slovak,^{[24]} Spanish,^{[25]} Sundanese, Swedish, Tswana,^{[52]} Venda,^{[51]} Võro, Walloon,^{[27]} Waray,^{[11]} West Frisian, Xhosa, Zhuang, Zulu alphabets include all 26 letters, at least in their largest version.

Among alphabets for constructed languages the Interglossa and Occidental alphabets include all 26 letters.

The International Phonetic Alphabet (IPA) includes all 26 letters in their lowercase forms, although g is always single-storey (ɡ) in the IPA and never double-storey.

=== Alphabets that do not contain all ISO basic Latin letters ===
This list is based on official definitions of each alphabet. However, excluded letters might occur in non-integrated loan words and place names.

Reduced usage of the letters of the ISO basic Latin alphabet (A–Z) in various alphabets:
Alphabet	A	B	C	D	E	F	G	H	I	J	K	L	M	N	O	P	Q	R	S	T	U	V	W	X	Y	Z	#
Classical Latin^{[2]}	A	B	C	D	E	F	G	H	I		K	L	M	N	O	P	Q	R	S	T		V		X	Y	Z	23
Albanian^{[3]}	A	B	C	D	E	F	G	H	I	J	K	L	M	N	O	P	Q	R	S	T	U	V		X	Y	Z	25
Anglo-Saxon	A	B	C	D	E	F	G	H	I		K	L	M	N	O	P	Q	R	S	T	U			X	Y	Z	23
Arapaho		B	C		E			H	I		K			N	O				S	T	U		W		Y		13
Arbëresh	A	B	C	D	E	F	G	H	I	J	K	L	M	N	O	P	Q	R	S	T	U	V		X	Y	Z	25
Asturian	A	B	C	D	E	F	G	H	I			L	M	N	O	P	Q	R	S	T	U	V		X	Y	Z	23
Ayta Magbukun	A	B		D			G	H	I		K	L	M	N		P		R		T	U		W		Y		16
Azerbaijani^{[53]}	A	B	C	D	E	F	G	H	I	J	K	L	M	N	O	P	Q	R	S	T	U	V		X	Y	Z	25
Bambara^{[39]}	A	B	C	D	E	F	G	H	I	J	K	L	M	N	O	P		R	S	T	U		W		Y	Z	23
Belarusian^{[5]}	A	B	C	D	E	F	G	H	I	J	K	L	M	N	O	P		R	S	T	U	V			Y	Z	23
Berber	A	B	C	D	E	F	G	H	I	J	K	L	M	N	O		Q	R	S	T	U		W	X	Y	Z	24
Bislama^{[45]}	A	B		D	E	F	G	H	I	J	K	L	M	N	O	P		R	S	T	U	V	W		Y		22
Breton	A	B		D	E	F	G	H	I	J	K	L	M	N	O	P		R	S	T	U	V	W		Y	Z	23
Chamorro^{[43]}	A	B	C	D	E	F	G	H	I		K	L	M	N	O	P		R	S	T	U				Y		20
Chewa	A	B	C	D	E	F	G	H	I	J	K	L	M	N	O	P		R	S	T	U	V	W		Y	Z	24
Corsican^{[31]}	A	B	C	D	E	F	G	H	I	J		L	M	N	O	P	Q	R	S	T	U	V				Z	22
Crimean Tatar	A	B	C	D	E	F	G	H	I	J	K	L	M	N	O	P	Q	R	S	T	U	V			Y	Z	24
Croatian ^{[7]}	A	B	C	D	E	F	G	H	I	J	K	L	M	N	O	P		R	S	T	U	V				Z	22
Cypriot Arabic^{[59]}	A	B	C	D	E	F	G		I	J	K	L	M	N	O	P		R	S	T	U	V	W	X	Y	Z	24
Dakelh^{[61]}	A	B	C	D	E	F	G	H	I	J	K	L	M	N	O	P		R	S	T	U	V	W		Y	Z	22
Dakota	A	B	C	D	E		G	H	I	J	K		M	N	O	P			S	T	U		W		Y	Z	20
Dalecarlian	A	B		D	E	F	G	H	I	J	K	L	M	N	O	P		R	S	T	U	V	W		Y		22
Dinka^{[40]}	A	B	C	D	E		G	H	I	J	K	L	M	N	O	P		R		T	U		W		Y		20
Esperanto	A	B	C	D	E	F	G	H	I	J	K	L	M	N	O	P		R	S	T	U	V				Z	22
Estonian	A	B		D	E	F	G	H	I	J	K	L	M	N	O	P		R	S	T	U	V				Z	21
Extremaduran	A	B	C	D	E	F	G	H	I	J		L	M	N	O	P	Q	R	S	T	U	V		X	Y	Z	24
Fala	A	B	C	D	E	F	G	H	I	J		L	M	N	O	P	Q	R	S	T	U	V		X		Z	23
Faroese	A	B		D	E	F	G	H	I	J	K	L	M	N	O	P		R	S	T	U	V			Y		21
Filipino Abakada^{[11]}	A	B		D	E		G	H	I		K	L	M	N	O	P		R	S	T	U		W		Y		19
Friulian	A	B	C	D	E	F	G	H	I	J		L	M	N	O	P		R	S	T	U	V				Z	21
Fula^{[41]}	A	B	C	D	E	F	G	H	I	J	K	L	M	N	O	P		R	S	T	U		W	X	Y		23
Gagauz	A	B	C	D	E	F	G	H	I	J	K	L	M	N	O	P		R	S	T	U	V			Y	Z	23
Galician^{[33]}	A	B	C	D	E	F	G	H	I			L	M	N	O	P	Q	R	S	T	U	V		X		Z	22
Gilbertese	A	B			E				I		K		M	N	O			R		T	U		W				12
Glosa	A	B	C	D	E	F	G	H	I	J	K	L	M	N	O	P	Q	R	S	T	U	V	W	X		Z	25
Traditional Greenlandic	A				E	F	G		I	J	K	L	M	N	O	P	Q	R	S	T	U	V					18
Guaraní^{[14]}	A	B	C	D	E		G	H	I	J	K	L	M	N	O	P		R	S	T	U	V			Y		21
Gwich'in^{[67]}	A	B	C	D	E	F	G	H	I	J	K	L	M	N	O			R	S	T	U	V	W		Y	Z	23
Haitian	A	B	C	D	E	F	G	H	I	J	K	L	M	N	O	P		R	S	T	U	V	W	X	Y	Z	25
Hän	A	B	C	D	E		G	H	I	J	K	L	M	N	O	P		R	S	T	U		W		Y	Z	22
Hausa^{[30]}	A	B	C	D	E	F	G	H	I	J	K	L	M	N	O	P		R	S	T	U		W		Y	Z	23
Hawaiian	A				E			H	I		K	L	M	N	O	P					U		W				12
Icelandic	A	B		D	E	F	G	H	I	J	K	L	M	N	O	P		R	S	T	U	V		X	Y		22
Igbo^{[42]}	A	B	C	D	E	F	G	H	I	J	K	L	M	N	O	P		R	S	T	U	V	W		Y	Z	24
Inari Sami	A	B	C	D	E	F	G	H	I	J	K	L	M	N	O	P		R	S	T	U	V			Y	Z	23
Traditional Irish^{[16]}	A	B	C	D	E	F	G	H	I			L	M	N	O	P		R	S	T	U						18
Italian^{[17]}	A	B	C	D	E	F	G	H	I			L	M	N	O	P	Q	R	S	T	U	V				Z	21
Karelian	A	B	C	D	E	F	G	H	I	J	K	L	M	N	O	P		R	S	T	U	V			Y	Z	23
Kashubian	A	B	C	D	E	F	G	H	I	J	K	L	M	N	O	P		R	S	T	U		W		Y	Z	23
Kazakh^{[38]}	A	B		D	E	F	G	H	I	J	K	L	M	N	O	P	Q	R	S	T	U	V			Y	Z	23
Khasi	A	B		D	E		G	H	I	J	K	L	M	N	O	P		R	S	T	U		W		Y		20
Latvian^{[18]}	A	B	C	D	E	F	G	H	I	J	K	L	M	N	O	P		R	S	T	U	V			(Y)	Z	23
Lithuanian^{[19]}	A	B	C	D	E	F	G	H	I	J	K	L	M	N	O	P		R	S	T	U	V			Y	Z	23
Livonian^{[46]}	A	B		D	E	F	G	H	I	J	K	L	M	N	O	P		R	S	T	U	V			(Y)	Z	23
Lojban	A	B	C	D	E	F	G		I	J	K	L	M	N	O	P		R	S	T	U	V		X	Y	Z	23
Lule Sami^{[60]}	A	B		D	E	F	G	H	I	J	K	L	M	N	O	P		R	S	T	U	V					20
Malagasy	A	B		D	E	F	G	H	I	J	K	L	M	N	O	P		R	S	T		V			Y	Z	21
Maltese^{[20]}	A	B		D	E	F	G	H	I	J	K	L	M	N	O	P	Q	R	S	T	U	V	W	X		Z	24
Manx Gaelic	A	B	C	D	E	F	G	H	I	J	K	L	M	N	O	P	Q	R	S	T	U	V	W		Y		24
Māori^{[34]}	A				E		G	H	I		K		M	N	O	P		R		T	U		W				14
Marshallese^{[47]}	A	B		D	E				I	J	K	L	M	N	O	P		R		T	U		W		Y		17
Massachusett^{[62]}	A		C		E			H			K		M	N		P	Q		S	T	U		W		Y		14
Mirandese	A	B	C	D	E	F	G	H	I	J		L	M	N	O	P	Q	R	S	T	U			X	Y	Z	23
Mohawk	A				E			H	I		K			N	O			R	S	T			W		Y		12
Na'vi^{[57]}	A				E	F	G	H	I		K	L	M	N	O	P		R	S	T	U	V	W	X	Y	Z	21
Navajo	A	B	C	D	E		G	H	I	J	K	L	M	N	O				S	T			W	X	Y	Z	20
Northern Sami	A	B	C	D	E	F	G	H	I	J	K	L	M	N	O	P		R	S	T	U	V				Z	22
Nuxalk	A		C					H	I		K	L	M	N		P	Q		S	T	U		W	X	Y		16
Occitan	A	B	C	D	E	F	G	H	I	J		L	M	N	O	P	Q	R	S	T	U	V		X		Z	23
Pan-Nigerian	A	B	C	D	E	F	G	H	I	J	K	L	M	N	O	P		R	S	T	U	V	W		Y	Z	24
Piedmontese	A	B	C	D	E	F	G	H	I	J		L	M	N	O	P	Q	R	S	T	U	V				Z	22
Pinyin^{[32]}	A	B	C	D	E	F	G	H	I	J	K	L	M	N	O	P	Q	R	S	T	U		W	X	Y	Z	25
Romani^{[29]}	A	B	C	D	E	F	G	H	I	J	K	L	M	N	O	P		R	S	T	U	V		X		Z	23
Rotokas	A				E		G		I		K				O	P		R	S	T	U	V					12
Samoan	A				E	F	G	H	I		K	L	M	N	O	P		R	S	T	U	V					17
Sardinian	A	B	C	D	E	F	G	H	I	J		L	M	N	O	P	Q	R	S	T	U	V		X	Y	Z	24
Scottish Gaelic	A	B	C	D	E	F	G	H	I			L	M	N	O	P		R	S	T	U						18
Serbian^{[7]}	A	B	C	D	E	F	G	H	I	J	K	L	M	N	O	P		R	S	T	U	V				Z	22
Shona	A	B	C	D	E	F	G	H	I	J	K		M	N	O	P		R	S	T	U	V	W		Y	Z	24
Sicilian	A	B	C	D	E	F	G	H	I	J		L	M	N	O	P	Q	R	S	T	U	V				Z	22
Skolt Sami	A	B	C	D	E	F	G	H	I	J	K	L	M	N	O	P		R	S	T	U	V				Z	22
Slovenian	A	B	C	D	E	F	G	H	I	J	K	L	M	N	O	P		R	S	T	U	V				Z	22
Somali	A	B	C	D	E	F	G	H	I	J	K	L	M	N	O		Q	R	S	T	U		W	X	Y		23
Sorbian^{[64]}	A	B	C	D	E	F	G	H	I	J	K	L	M	N	O	P		R	S	T	U		W		Y	Z	23
Southern Sami	A	B		D	E	F	G	H	I	J	K	L	M	N	O	P		R	S	T	U	V			Y		21
Swahili	A	B	C	D	E	F	G	H	I	J	K	L	M	N	O	P		R	S	T	U	V	W		Y	Z	24
Tahitian	A				E	F		H	I				M	N	O	P		R		T	U	V					13
Tetun	A	B		D	E	F	G	H	I	J	K	L	M	N	O	P		R	S	T	U	V	W	X		Z	23
Toki Pona	A				E				I	J	K	L	M	N	O	P			S	T	U		W				14
Tongan	A				E	F	G	H	I		K	L	M	N	O	P			S	T	U	V					16
Turkish	A	B	C	D	E	F	G	H	I	J	K	L	M	N	O	P		R	S	T	U	V			Y	Z	23
Turkmen^{[55]}	A	B		D	E	F	G	H	I	J	K	L	M	N	O	P		R	S	T	U		W		Y	Z	22
Ulithian^{[49]}	A	B	C	D	E	F	G	H	I		K	L	M	N	O	P		R	S	T	U		W		Y		21
Ume Sami	A	B		D	E	F	G	H	I	J	K	L	M	N	O	P		R	S	T	U	V			Y		21
Uyghur	A	B	C	D	E	F	G	H	I	J	K	L	M	N	O	P	Q	R	S	T	U		W	X	Y	Z	25
Uzbek^{[25]}	A	B	C	D	E	F	G	H	I	J	K	L	M	N	O	P	Q	R	S	T	U	V		X	Y	Z	25
Veps	A	B	C	D	E	F	G	H	I	J	K	L	M	N	O	P		R	S	T	U	V				Z	22
Vietnamese^{[26]}	A	B	C	D	E		G	H	I		K	L	M	N	O	P	Q	R	S	T	U	V		X	Y		22
Volapük	A	B	C	D	E	F	G	H	I	J	K	L	M	N	O	P		R	S	T	U	V		X	Y	Z	24
Welsh^{[28]}	A	B	C	D	E	F	G	H	I	J		L	M	N	O	P		R	S	T	U		W		Y		21
Wolof	A	B	C	D	E	F	G		I	J	K	L	M	N	O	P	Q	R	S	T	U		W	X	Y		24
Yapese^{[50]}	A	B	C	D	E	F	G	H	I	J	K	L	M	N	O	P	Q	R	S	T	U		W		Y		23
Yoruba^{[44]}	A	B		D	E	F	G	H	I	J	K	L	M	N	O	P		R	S	T	U		W		Y		21
Zuni^{[66]}	A	B	C	D	E			H	I		K	L	M	N	O	P			S	T	U		W		Y		18
count	103	93	74	91	102	86	96	98	103	79	88	95	101	103	101	97	33	96	97	103	100	67	49	32	72	66	

The I is used in two distinct versions in Turkic languages: dotless (I ı) and dotted (İ i). They are considered different letters, and case conversion must take care to preserve the distinction. Irish traditionally does not write the dot, or tittle, over the small letter i, but the language makes no distinction here if a dot is displayed, so no specific encoding and special case conversion rule is needed as it is for Turkic alphabets.

==== Statistics ====
The chart above lists a variety of alphabets that do not officially contain all 26 letters of the ISO basic Latin alphabet. In this list of 104 languages, at least one language lacks one of every letter. For each of the 26 basic ISO Latin alphabet letters, the number of alphabets in the list above using it is as follows:

Letter	A	I	N	T	E	O	M	U	S	P	H	R	G	L	B	D	K	F	J	C	Y	V	Z	W	Q	X
Alphabets	102	102	102	102	101	100	100	99	96	96	96	95	94	94	93	90	87	85	78	73	71	68	64	48	33	32

== Letters not contained in the ISO basic Latin alphabet ==
Some languages have extended the Latin alphabet with ligatures, modified letters, or digraphs. These symbols are listed below.

=== Additional letters by type ===
==== Independent letters and ligatures ====
Additional base letters	Æ	Ɑ	Ꞵ	Ð	Ǝ	Ə	Ɛ	Ɣ	I	Ɩ	Ŋ	Œ	Ɔ	Ꞷ	Ʊ	K'	ẞ	Ʃ	Þ	Ʋ	Ƿ	Ȝ	Ʒ	ʔ
Additional base letters	æ	ɑ	ꞵ	ð	ǝ	ə	ɛ	ɣ	ı	ɩ	ŋ	œ	ɔ	ꞷ	ʊ	ĸ	ß	ʃ	þ	ʋ	ƿ	ȝ	ʒ	ʔ
Anglo-Saxon	Æ			Ð															Þ		Ƿ	Ȝ		
Azeri^{[53]}						Ə			I															
Bambara^{[39]}							Ɛ				Ŋ		Ɔ											
Northern Berber							Ɛ	Ɣ																
Southern Berber					Ǝ			Ɣ			Ŋ													
Crimean Tatar									I															
Dalecarlian				Ð																				
Danish^{[9]} Norwegian^{[9]} Southern Sami (Norway)	Æ																							
Dinka							Ɛ	Ɣ			Ŋ		Ɔ											
Faroese	Æ			Ð																				
Greenlandic	Æ															(ĸ)								
German^{[13]}																	ß							
Icelandic Norn	Æ			Ð															Þ					
Celtic British English^{[36]} French^{[12]} Latin^{[2]}	Æ											Œ												
Inari Sami Northern Sami Lule Sami^{[60]} Fula^{[41]} Alphabet of Mauritania Alphabet of Senegal											Ŋ													
Skolt Sami											Ŋ												Ʒ	
Pan-Nigerian					Ǝ																			
Turkish Kazakh^{[38]}									I															
Alphabet of Cameroon	Æ	Ɑ				Ə	Ɛ				Ŋ	Œ	Ɔ											
Alphabet of Benin					Ǝ		Ɛ	Ɣ			Ŋ		Ɔ		Ʊ					Ʋ				
Alphabet of Burkina Faso					Ǝ		Ɛ			Ɩ	Ŋ		Ɔ							Ʋ				
Alphabet of Chad^{[68]}						Ə	Ɛ				Ŋ		Ɔ											
Alphabet of Côte d'Ivoire							Ɛ			Ɩ	Ŋ		Ɔ		Ʊ									Ɂ
Scientific Alphabet of Gabon			Ꞵ	Ð	Ǝ		Ɛ	Ɣ			Ŋ		Ɔ					Ʃ					Ʒ	Ɂ
Alphabet of Mali					Ǝ		Ɛ	Ɣ			Ŋ		Ɔ											Ɂ
Alphabet of Niger					Ǝ			Ɣ			Ŋ													
Alphabet of Zaïre							Ɛ						Ɔ											
African reference alphabet		Ɑ			Ǝ		Ɛ	Ɣ		Ɩ	Ŋ		Ɔ	Ꞷ				Ʃ		Ʋ			Ʒ	Ɂ
Count	7	2	1	5	8	3	12	8	3	3	14	2	11	1	2	1	1	2	2	3	1	1	3	4

==== Letter–diacritic combinations: connected or overlaid ====
Modified letters	Ą	A̧	Ą̊	Ɓ	Ƈ	Ç	Đ	Ɗ	Ɖ	Ę	Ȩ	Ə̧	Ɛ̧	Ƒ	Ǥ	Ɠ	Ħ	Ɦ	Į	I̧	Ɨ	Ɨ̧	Ƙ	Ł	M̧	Ɲ	Ǫ	O̧	Ø	Ơ	Ɔ̧	Ƥ	Ɍ	Ş	Ƭ	Ţ	Ŧ	Ų	U̧	Ư	Ʉ	Y̨	Ƴ
Modified letters	ą	a̧	ą̊	ɓ	ƈ	ç	đ	ɗ	ɖ	ę	ȩ	ə̧	ɛ̧	ƒ	ǥ	ɠ	ħ	ɦ	į	i̧	ɨ	ɨ̧	ƙ	ł	m̧	ɲ	ǫ	o̧	ø	ơ	ɔ̧	ƥ	ɍ	ş	ƭ	ţ	ŧ	ų	u̧	ư	ʉ	y̨	ƴ
Albanian^{[3]} Arbëresh Catalan^{[6]} English^{[36]} Extremaduran Fala French^{[12]} Friulian German^{[13]} Manx Mirandese Norwegian^{[9]} Occitan Portuguese^{[23]} (Spanish)^{[25]} Walloon^{[27]}						Ç																																					
Azeri^{[53]} Crimean Tatar Kurdish Turkish Turkmen^{[55]}						Ç																												Ş									
Bambara^{[39]} Dinka^{[40]}																										Ɲ																	
Belarusian^{[5]} Sorbian^{[64]}																								Ł																			
Croatian^{[7]} Inari Sami							Đ																																				
Cypriot Arabic^{[59]} Kazakh^{[38]}																																		Ş									
Danish^{[9]} Faroese Greenlandic Norn Norwegian^{[9]} Southern Sami (Norway)																													Ø														
Dalecarlian	Ą		Ą̊							Ę									Į																			Ų				Y̨	
Fula^{[41]}				Ɓ				Ɗ								Ɠ										Ɲ																	Ƴ
Gagauz						Ç																												Ş		Ţ							
Hän Navajo	Ą									Ę									Į					Ł			Ǫ																
Hausa^{[30]}				Ɓ				Ɗ															Ƙ																				Ƴ
Gwich'in	Ą									Ę									Į					Ł			Ǫ											Ų					
Kashubian Polish^{[22]}	Ą									Ę														Ł																			
Lithuanian^{[19]}	Ą									Ę									Į																			Ų					
Pan-Nigerian				Ɓ				Ɗ															Ƙ																				
Maltese^{[20]}																	Ħ																										
Marshallese^{[47]}																									M̧			O̧															
Romanian (nonstandard)^{[10]}																																		Ş		Ţ							
Northern Sami Ume Sami							Đ																														Ŧ						
Skolt Sami							Đ								Ǥ																												
Vietnamese^{[26]}							Đ																							Ơ										Ư			
Zuni^{[66]}																								Ł																			
Alphabet of Benin									Ɖ					Ƒ																													
Alphabet of Burkina Faso				Ɓ		Ç		Ɗ																																			Ƴ
Alphabet of Chad^{[68]}				Ɓ				Ɗ										Ɦ			Ɨ																						Ƴ
Alphabet of Cameroon		A̧		Ɓ				Ɗ			Ȩ	Ə̧	Ɛ̧							I̧	Ɨ	Ɨ̧						O̧	Ø		Ɔ̧								U̧				Ƴ
Scientific Alphabet of Gabon									Ɖ																								Ɍ										
Alphabet of Mali				Ɓ				Ɗ																		Ɲ																	Ƴ
Alphabet of Mauritania				Ɓ				Ɗ																																			Ƴ
Alphabet of Niger				Ɓ				Ɗ															Ƙ			Ɲ							Ɍ										Ƴ
Alphabet of Senegal				Ɓ	Ƈ			Ɗ																										Ş	Ƭ	Ţ	Ŧ						Ƴ
Count	7	1	1	10	1	23	6	10	2	7	1	1	1	1	1	1	1	1	4	1	2	1	3	8	1	5	2	2	7	1	1	0	2	10	1	3	3	3	1	1	0	1	9

=== Other letters in collation order ===
The tables below are a work in progress. Eventually, table cells with light blue shading will indicate letter forms that do not constitute distinct letters in their associated alphabets. Please help with this task if you have the required linguistic knowledge and technical editing skill.

For the order in which the characters are sorted in each alphabet, see collating sequence.

==== Letters derived from A–H ====
Letter-diacritic combinations (detached) in various Latin alphabets (A–H)
Alphabet	Á	À	Ȧ	Â	Ä	Ǟ	Ǎ	Ă	Ā	Ã	Å	Ǻ	Ǽ	Ǣ	Ḅ	Ć	Ċ	Ĉ	Č	Ď	Ḍ	Ḑ	Ḓ	É	È	Ė	Ê	Ë	Ě	Ĕ	Ē	Ẽ	E̊	Ẹ	Ǵ	Ġ	Ĝ	Ǧ	Ğ	G̃	Ģ	Ĥ	Ḥ
Alphabet	á	à	ȧ	â	ä	ǟ	ǎ	ă	ā	ã	å	ǻ	ǽ	ǣ	ḅ	ć	ċ	ĉ	č	ď	ḍ	ḑ	ḓ	é	è	ė	ê	ë	ě	ĕ	ē	ẽ	e̊	ẹ	ǵ	ġ	ĝ	ǧ	ğ	g̃	ģ	ĥ	ḥ
Latin^{[2]}								Ă	Ā																			Ë		Ĕ	Ē												
Afrikaans^{[54]}	Á				Ä																			É	È		Ê	Ë															
Albanian^{[3]}				(Â)																							(Ê)	Ë															
Alemannic	Á	À		Â	Ä						Å													É	È		Ê																
Anglo-Saxon									Ā					Ǣ																	Ē												
Arbëresh	Á																							É				Ë															
Aromanian										Ã																																	
Asturian	Á																							É																			Ḥ
Austro-Bavarian	Á	À		Â	Ä						Å													É	È		Ê																
Ayta Magbukun	Á	À		Â																																							
Azeri^{[53]}					(Ä)																																		Ğ				
Belarusian^{[5]}																Ć			Č																								
Northern Berber																			Č		Ḍ																	Ǧ					Ḥ
Southern Berber								Ă							Ḅ						Ḍ																						Ḥ
Bislama^{[45]}																								É																			
Breton				Â																				É			Ê																
Catalan^{[6]}		À																						É	È																		
Celtic British								Ă	Ā																					Ĕ	Ē												
Chamorro^{[43]}	Á										Å	Ǻ														É																	
Corsican^{[31]}		À																							È																		
Crimean Tatar				Â																																			Ğ				
Croatian^{[7]}																Ć			Č																								
Cypriot Arabic^{[59]}																	Ċ																			Ġ							
Czech^{[8]}	Á																		Č	Ď				É					Ě														
Dalecarlian					Ä						Å																																
Danish^{[9]}	Á										Å	Ǻ	Ǽ											É																			
Dutch^{[10]}	Á	À		Â	Ä																			É	È		Ê	Ë															
Emilian-Romagnol		À		Â	Ä						Å													É	È		Ê	Ë			Ē												
English^{[36]}		À		Â	Ä						Å													É	È		Ê	Ë															
Esperanto																		Ĉ																			Ĝ					Ĥ	
Estonian					Ä																																						
Extremaduran	Á																							É																			
Fala	Á									Ã														É								Ẽ											
Faroese	Á																																										
Filipino^{[11]}	Á	À		Â																				É	È		Ê	Ë												G̃			
Finnish					Ä						Å																																
French^{[12]}		À		Â																				É	È		Ê	Ë															
Friulian		À		Â																					È		Ê																
Gagauz					Ä																						Ê																
Galician^{[33]}	Á																							É																			
German^{[13]}	Á	À		Â	Ä																			É	È		Ê																
Greenlandic	(Á)			(Â)						(Ã)	Å													(É)			(Ê)																
Guaraní^{[14]}	Á									Ã														É								Ẽ								G̃			
Gwich'in		À																							È																		
Haitian		À																							È																		
Hän		À		Â	Ä		Ǎ																		È		Ê	Ë	Ě														
Hawaiian									Ā																						Ē												
Hungarian^{[15]}	Á																							É																			
Icelandic	Á																							É																			
Igbo	Á	À																						É	È																		
Inari Sami	Á			Â	Ä						Å								Č																								
Irish^{[16]}	Á																							É																			
Italian^{[17]}	Á	À																						É	È																		
Javanese																								É	È																		
Karakalpak^{[23]}	Á																																		Ǵ								
Karelian					Ä														Č																								
Kashubian										Ã						Ć								É				Ë															
Kazakh^{[38]}					Ä																																		Ğ				
Kurdish																											Ê																
Latvian^{[18]}									Ā										Č												Ē										Ģ		
Lithuanian^{[19]}																			Č							Ė																	
Livonian^{[46]}					Ä	Ǟ			Ā													Ḑ									Ē												
Lule Sami^{[60]}	Á				Ä						Å																																
Luxembourgish				Â	Ä																			É	È		Ê	Ë															
Malagasy	Á	À		Â																					È		Ê																
Maltese^{[20]}		À															Ċ								È											Ġ							
Māori									Ā																						Ē												
Marshallese^{[47]}									Ā																																		
Massachusett^{[62]}				Â																																							
Mirandese	Á																							É			Ê																
Mohawk	Á	À																						É	È																		
Na'vi^{[57]}					Ä																																						
Navajo	Á																							É																			
Norn	Á										Å													É																			
Northern Sami	Á																		Č																								
Norwegian^{[9]}		À			Ä						Å													É	È		Ê																
Occitan	Á	À																						É	È																		
Pan-Nigerian																																		Ẹ									
Papiamento^{[63]}	Á																							É	È																		
Piedmontese^{[37]}		À																						É	È			Ë															
Pinyin^{[32]}	Á	À					Ǎ		Ā															É	È		Ê		Ě		Ē												
Polish^{[22]}																Ć								(É)																			
Portuguese^{[23]}	Á	À		Â						Ã														É	(È)		Ê					(Ẽ)											
Rhaeto-Romance		À																						É	È																		
Romani^{[29]}																			Č																								
Romanian				Â				Ă																																			
Samoan	Á								Ā															É							Ē												
Sardinian	Á	À																						É	È																		
Scottish Gaelic	(Á)	À																						(É)	È																		
Alphabet of Senegal																					Ḍ							Ë														Ĥ	Ḥ
Serbian^{[7]}																Ć			Č																								
Sicilian		À		Â																					È		Ê																
Skolt Sami				Â	Ä						Å								Č																			Ǧ					
Slovak^{[24]}	Á				Ä														Č	Ď				É																			
Slovenian	Á	À			Ä											Ć			Č					É	È		Ê																
Sorbian^{[64]}																Ć			Č										Ě														
Southern Sami (Norway)											Å																																
Southern Sami (Sweden)					Ä						Å																																
Spanish^{[25]}	Á																							É																			
Sundanese																								É																			
Swedish^{[21]}	Á	À			Ä						Å													É	È			Ë															
Tahitian									Ā																						Ē												
Tetun	Á																							É																			
Tongan	Á								Ā															É							Ē												
Tswana^{[52]}																											Ê																
Turkish				Â																																			Ğ				
Turkmen^{[55]}					Ä																																						
Ulithian^{[49]}			Ȧ																							Ė																	
Ume Sami	Á				Ä						Å																																
Uyghur																												Ë															
Venda^{[51]}	Á																						Ḓ	É																			
Veps					Ä														Č																								
Vietnamese^{[26]}	Á	À		Â				Ă		Ã														É	È		Ê					Ẽ		Ẹ									
Volapük					Ä																																						
Võro					Ä																																						
Walloon^{[27]}		À		Â							Å													É	È		Ê	Ë					E̊										
Waray^{[11]}	Á	À		Â																				É	È		Ê	Ë												G̃			
Welsh^{[28]}	Á	À		Â	Ä																			É	È		Ê	Ë															
West Frisian				Â	Ä																			É			Ê	Ë															
Wolof Alphabet of Mauritania		À																						É				Ë															
Xhosa	Á	À		Â	Ä																			É	È		Ê	Ë															
Yapese^{[50]}					Ä																							Ë															
Yoruba^{[56]}	Á	À		Â			Ǎ			Ã														É	È		Ê		Ě			Ẽ		Ẹ									

==== Letters derived from I–O ====
Letter-diacritic combinations (detached) in various Latin alphabets (I–O)
Alphabet	Í	Ì	İ	Î	Ï	Ǐ	Ĭ	Ī	Ĩ	Ị	Ĵ	Ķ	Ǩ	Ĺ	Ļ	Ľ	Ŀ	Ḷ	Ḽ	M̂	M̄	ʼN	Ń	N̂	Ṅ	N̈	Ň	N̄	Ñ	Ņ	Ṋ	Ó	Ò	Ȯ	Ȱ	Ô	Ö	Ȫ	Ǒ	Ŏ	Ō	Õ	Ȭ	Ő	Ọ	Ǿ	Ơ
Alphabet	í	ì	i	î	ï	ǐ	ĭ	ī	ĩ	ị	ĵ	ķ	ǩ	ĺ	ļ	ľ	ŀ	ḷ	ḽ	m̂	m̄	ŉ	ń	n̂	ṅ	n̈	ň	n̄	ñ	ņ	ṋ	ó	ò	ȯ	ȱ	ô	ö	ȫ	ǒ	ŏ	ō	õ	ȭ	ő	ọ	ǿ	ơ
Latin^{[2]}							Ĭ	Ī																																Ŏ	Ō						
Afrikaans^{[54]}	Í			Î	Ï																	ŉ										Ó				Ô	Ö										
Albanian^{[3]}				(Î)																																(Ô)											
Alemannic	Í	Ì		Î																												Ó	Ò			Ô	Ö										
Anglo-Saxon								Ī																																	Ō						
Arbëresh	Í																															Ó	Ò			Ô											
Asturian	Í																	Ḷ											Ñ			Ó															
Austro-Bavarian	Í	Ì		Î																												Ó	Ò			Ô	Ö										
Ayta Magbukun	Í	Ì		Î																																											
Azeri^{[53]}			İ																																		Ö										
Basque^{[4]}																													Ñ																		
Belarusian^{[5]}																							Ń																								
Northern Berber																																															
Southern Berber																		Ḷ																													
Bislama^{[45]}					Ï																(M̄)																										
Breton				Î																									Ñ							Ô											
Catalan^{[6]}	Í				Ï												Ŀ															Ó	Ò														
Celtic British							Ĭ	Ī																																Ŏ	Ō						
Chamorro^{[43]}	Í																												Ñ			Ó															
Corsican^{[31]}		Ì			Ï																												Ò														
Crimean Tatar			İ																										Ñ								Ö										
Czech^{[8]}	Í																										Ň					Ó															
Dalecarlian																																					Ö										
Danish^{[9]}	Í																															Ó														Ǿ	
Dutch^{[10]}	Í	Ì		Î	Ï																											Ó	Ò			Ô	Ö										
Emilian-Romagnol		Ì		Î																					Ṅ							Ó	Ò			Ô	Ö				Ō						
English^{[36]}				Î	Ï																											Ó				Ô	Ö										
Esperanto											Ĵ																																				
Estonian																																					Ö					Õ					
Extremaduran	Í																												Ñ			Ó															
Fala	Í								Ĩ																							Ó										Õ					
Faroese	Í																															Ó															
Filipino^{[11]}	Í	Ì		Î																									Ñ			Ó	Ò														
Finnish																																					Ö										
French^{[12]}				Î	Ï																															Ô											
Friulian		Ì		Î																													Ò			Ô											
Fula^{[41]}																													Ñ																		
Gagauz			İ																										Ñ								Ö										
Galician^{[33]}	Í				Ï																								Ñ			Ó															
German^{[13]}																													Ñ								Ö										
Greenlandic	(Í)			(Î)					(Ĩ)																											(Ô)											
Guaraní^{[14]}	Í								Ĩ																				Ñ			Ó										Õ					
Gwich'in		Ì																															Ò														
Haitian																																	Ò														
Hän		Ì		Î		Ǐ																											Ò			Ô			Ǒ								
Hawaiian								Ī																																	Ō						
Hungarian^{[15]}	Í																															Ó					Ö							Ő			
Icelandic	Í																															Ó					Ö										
Igbo	Í	Ì								Ị															Ṅ							Ó	Ò												Ọ		
Inari Sami																																					Ö										
Irish^{[16]}	Í																															Ó															
Italian^{[17]}	Í	Ì		Î	Ï																											Ó	Ò														
Karakalpak^{[23]}	Í																						Ń									Ó															
Karelian																																					Ö										
Kashubian																							Ń									Ó	Ò			Ô											
Kazakh^{[38]}			İ																										Ñ								Ö										
Khasi					Ï																								Ñ																		
Kurdish				Î																																											
Latvian^{[18]}								Ī				Ķ			Ļ															Ņ											(Ō)						
Livonian^{[46]}								Ī							Ļ															Ņ				Ȯ	Ȱ		(Ö)	(Ȫ)			Ō	Õ	Ȭ				
Luxembourgish				Î																(M̂)				(N̂)												Ô	Ö										
Malagasy		Ì																								N̈			Ñ				Ò			Ô											
Maltese^{[20]}		Ì		Î																													Ò														
Māori								Ī																																	Ō						
Marshallese^{[47]}															Ļ													N̄		Ņ											Ō						
Massachusett^{[62]}																																				Ô											
Mirandese	Í																															Ó				Ô											
Mohawk	Í	Ì																														Ó	Ò														
Na'vi^{[57]}		Ì																																													
Navajo	Í																															Ó															
Norn	Í																															Ó															
Norwegian^{[9]}				Î																												Ó	Ò			Ô											
Occitan	Í																															Ó	Ò														
Pan-Nigerian										Ị																																			Ọ		
Papiamento^{[63]}	Í																												Ñ			Ó	Ò														
Piedmontese^{[37]}		Ì																															Ò														
Pinyin^{[32]}	Í	Ì				Ǐ		Ī																								Ó	Ò						Ǒ		Ō						
Polish^{[22]}																							Ń									Ó															
Portuguese^{[23]}	Í	(Ì)			(Ï)																											Ó	(Ò)			Ô						Õ					
Quechua																													Ñ																		
Rhaeto-Romance		Ì		Î																													Ò														
Romanian				Î																																											
Samoan	Í							Ī																								Ó									Ō						
Sardinian	Í	Ì																														Ó	Ò														
Scottish Gaelic		Ì																														(Ó)	Ò														
Alphabet of Senegal																													Ñ																		
Sicilian		Ì		Î																													Ò			Ô											
Skolt Sami													Ǩ																								Ö					Õ					
Slovak^{[24]}	Í													Ĺ		Ľ											Ň					Ó				Ô	Ö										
Slovenian	Í	Ì																														Ó	Ò			Ô	Ö										
Sorbian^{[64]}																							Ń									Ó															
Southern Sami (Norway)					Ï																																										
Southern Sami (Sweden)					Ï																																Ö										
Spanish^{[25]}	Í				Ï																								Ñ			Ó															
Swedish^{[21]}																																					Ö										
Tahitian								Ī																																	Ō						
Tetun	Í																												Ñ			Ó															
Tongan	Í							Ī																								Ó									Ō						
Tswana^{[52]}																																				Ô											
Turkish			İ	Î																																	Ö										
Turkmen^{[55]}																												Ň									Ö										
Ulithian^{[49]}																																		Ȯ													
Ume Sami					Ï																																Ö										
Uyghur																																					Ö										
Venda^{[51]}	Í																		Ḽ						Ṅ						Ṋ	Ó															
Veps																																				Ö											
Vietnamese^{[26]}	Í	Ì							Ĩ	Ị																					Ó	Ò			Ô						Õ			Ọ			Ơ
Volapük																																				Ö											
Võro																																				Ö					Õ						
Walloon^{[27]}		Ì		Î																															Ô	Ö											
Waray^{[11]}	Í	Ì		Î																									Ñ			Ó	Ò														
Welsh^{[28]}	Í	Ì		Î	Ï																										Ó	Ò			Ô	Ö											
West Frisian					Ï																														Ô	Ö											
Wolof Alphabet of Mauritania																												Ñ			Ó																
Xhosa	Í	Ì		Î	Ï																										Ó	Ò			Ô	Ö											
Yapese^{[50]}																																				Ö											
Yoruba^{[56]}	Í	Ì		Î		Ǐ			Ĩ											M̄		Ń					N̄				Ó	Ò			Ô			Ǒ			Õ			Ọ			

==== Letters derived from P–Z ====
Letter-diacritic combinations (detached) in various Latin alphabets (P–Z)
Alphabet	P̄	Ŕ	Ř	Ŗ	Ṛ	Ś	Ŝ	Ṡ	Š	Ș	Ṣ	Ť	Ț	Ṭ	Ṱ	Ú	Ù	Û	Ü	Ǔ	Ŭ	Ū	Ũ	Ű	Ů	Ụ	Ẃ	Ẁ	Ŵ	Ẅ	Ẋ	Ý	Ỳ	Ŷ	Ÿ	Ȳ	Ỹ	Ź	Ż	Ž	Ẓ	Ǯ
Alphabet	p̄	ŕ	ř	ŗ	ṛ	ś	ŝ	ṡ	š	ș	ṣ	ť	ț	ṭ	ṱ	ú	ù	û	ü	ǔ	ŭ	ū	ũ	ű	ů	ụ	ẃ	ẁ	ŵ	ẅ	ẋ	ý	ỳ	ŷ	ÿ	ȳ	ỹ	ź	ż	ž	ẓ	ǯ
Latin^{[2]}																					Ŭ	Ū																				
Afrikaans^{[54]}																Ú		Û	Ü													Ý										
Albanian^{[3]}																		(Û)																(Ŷ)								
Alemannic																Ú	Ù	Û	Ü																							
Anglo-Saxon																						Ū														Ȳ						
Arbëresh																Ú	Ù	Û																								
Asturian																Ú			Ü																							
Austro-Bavarian																Ú	Ù	Û	Ü																							
Ayta Magbukun																Ú	Ù	Û																								
Azeri^{[53]}																			Ü																							
Basque^{[4]}																			Ü																							
Belarusian^{[5]}						Ś			Š												Ŭ																	Ź		Ž		
Northern Berber			Ř		Ṛ						Ṣ			Ṭ																											Ẓ	
Southern Berber									Š		Ṣ			Ṭ																										Ž	Ẓ	
Bislama^{[45]}	(P̄)																		Ü																							
Breton																	Ù	Û	Ü																							
Alphabet of Burkina Faso																			Ü																							
Catalan^{[6]}																Ú			Ü																							
Celtic British																					Ŭ	Ū																				
Chamorro^{[43]}																Ú																										
Chewa																													Ŵ													
Corsican^{[31]}																	Ù																									
Crimean Tatar																			Ü																							
Croatian^{[7]}									Š																															Ž		
Czech^{[8]}			Ř						Š			Ť				Ú			Ü						Ů							Ý								Ž		
Danish^{[9]}																Ú																Ý										
Dutch^{[10]}																Ú	Ù	Û	Ü																							
Emilian-Romagnol								Ṡ									Ù	Û	Ü																				Ż			
English^{[36]}																		Û	Ü																							
Esperanto							Ŝ														Ŭ																					
Estonian									Š										Ü																					Ž		
Extremaduran																Ú			Ü																							
Fala																Ú			Ü				Ũ																			
Faroese																Ú																Ý										
Filipino^{[11]}																Ú	Ù	Û																								
Finnish									Š																															Ž		
French^{[12]}																	Ù	Û	Ü																Ÿ							
Friulian																	Ù	Û																								
Gagauz																			Ü																							
Galician^{[33]}																Ú			Ü																							
German^{[13]}																			Ü																							
Greenlandic																(Ú)		(Û)					(Ũ)																			
Guaraní^{[14]}																Ú							Ũ									Ý					Ỹ					
Gwich'in																	Ù																									
Hän																	Ù	Û		Ǔ																						
Hawaiian																						Ū																				
Hungarian^{[15]}																Ú			Ü					Ű																		
Icelandic																Ú																Ý										
Igbo																Ú	Ù									Ụ																
Inari Sami									Š																															Ž		
Irish^{[16]}																Ú																										
Italian^{[17]}																Ú	Ù																									
Karakalpak^{[23]}																Ú																										
Karelian									Š										(Ü)																					Ž		(Ǯ)
Kashubian						Ś											Ù																					Ź	Ż			
Kazakh^{[38]}																			Ü			Ū																				
Kurdish																		Û																								
Latvian^{[18]}				(Ŗ)					Š													Ū																		Ž		
Lithuanian^{[19]}									Š													Ū																		Ž		
Livonian^{[46]}				Ŗ					Š				Ț									Ū														(Ȳ)				Ž		
Luxembourgish																		Û	Ü																							
Malagasy																																	Ỳ									
Maltese^{[20]}																	Ù																						Ż			
Māori																						Ū																				
Marshallese^{[47]}																						Ū																				
Mirandese																Ú							Ũ																			
Norn																Ú																Ý										
Northern Sami									Š																															Ž		
Norwegian^{[9]}																	Ù		Ü																							
Occitan																Ú																										
Pan-Nigerian											Ṣ															Ụ																
Papiamento^{[63]}																Ú	Ù		Ü																							
Piedmontese^{[37]}																	Ù																									
Pinyin^{[32]}																Ú	Ù		Ü	Ǔ		Ū																				
Polish^{[22]}						Ś																																Ź	Ż			
Portuguese^{[23]}																Ú	(Ù)		(Ü)																							
Rhaeto-Romance																	Ù																									
Romani^{[29]}									Š																															Ž		
Romanian										Ș			Ț																													
Samoan																Ú						Ū																				
Sardinian																Ú	Ù																									
Scottish Gaelic																	Ù																									
Alphabet of Senegal							Ŝ				Ṣ			Ṭ															Ŵ		Ẋ			Ŷ					Ż		Ẓ	
Serbian^{[7]}									Š																															Ž		
Sicilian																	Ù	Û																								
Skolt Sami									Š																															Ž		Ǯ
Slovak^{[24]}		Ŕ							Š			Ť				Ú			Ü													Ý								Ž		
Slovenian									Š							Ú	Ù		Ü																					Ž		
Sorbian^{[64]}		Ŕ	Ř			Ś			Š																													Ź		Ž		
Spanish^{[25]}																Ú			Ü																							
Swedish																			Ü																							
Tahitian																						Ū																				
Tetun																Ú																										
Tongan																Ú						Ū																				
Tswana^{[52]}									Š																																	
Turkish																		Û	Ü																							
Turkmen^{[55]}																			Ü													Ý								Ž		
Ume Sami																			Ü																							
Uyghur																			Ü																							
Venda^{[51]}															Ṱ	Ú																										
Veps									Š										Ü																					Ž		
Vietnamese^{[26]}																Ú	Ù						Ũ			Ụ						Ý	Ỳ				Ỹ					
Volapük																			Ü																							
Võro									Š										Ü																					Ž		
Walloon^{[27]}																	Ù	Û																								
Waray^{[11]}																Ú	Ù	Û																								
Welsh^{[28]}																Ú	Ù	Û	Ü								Ẃ	Ẁ	Ŵ	Ẅ		Ý	Ỳ	Ŷ	Ÿ							
West Frisian																Ú		Û	Ü																							
Xhosa																Ú	Ù	Û	Ü																							
Yoruba^{[56]}											Ṣ					Ú	Ù	Û		Ǔ			Ũ																			

=== Notes ===
1. ↑↑↑↑ In classical Latin, the digraphs ⟨ch⟩, ⟨ph⟩, ⟨rh⟩, ⟨th⟩ were used in loanwords from Greek, but they were not included in the alphabet. The ligatures ⟨æ⟩, ⟨œ⟩ and ⟨w⟩, as well as lowercase letters, were added to the alphabet only in Middle Ages. The letters ⟨j⟩ and ⟨u⟩ were used as typographical variants of ⟨i⟩ and ⟨v⟩, respectively, roughly until the Enlightenment.
2. ↑↑↑↑ In Afrikaans, ⟨c⟩ and ⟨q⟩ are only (and ⟨x⟩ and ⟨z⟩ almost only) used in loanwords.
3. ↑↑↑↑ Albanian officially has the digraphs ⟨dh, gj, ll, nj, rr, sh, th, xh, zh⟩, which is sufficient to represent the Tosk dialect. The Gheg dialect supplements the official alphabet with 6 nasal vowels, namely ⟨â, ê, î, ô, û, ŷ⟩.
4. ↑↑↑↑ Arbëresh officially has the digraphs ⟨dh, gj, hj, ll, nj, rr, sh, th, xh, zh⟩. Arbëresh has the distinctive ⟨hj⟩, which is considered as a letter in its own right.
5. ↑↑ Achomi also has the digraph ⟨a'⟩.
6. ↑↑↑↑ Azeri only uses the letter ⟨ä⟩ as a substitute for ⟨ə⟩ if the latter cannot be used (it was replaced by the schwa one year later because it is the most common letter). These cases should be avoided! The letters ⟨w⟩, ⟨đ⟩, ⟨ŋ⟩, ⟨q̇⟩, ⟨ć⟩ (or the digraph ⟨ts⟩), and the digraph ⟨dz⟩ are only used in certain dialects.
7. ↑ Bambara also has the digraphs: ⟨kh⟩ (only present in loanwords), ⟨sh⟩ (also written as ⟨ʃ⟩; only present in some dialects). Historically, ⟨è⟩ was used instead of ⟨ɛ⟩, ⟨ny⟩ was used instead of ⟨ɲ⟩, and ⟨ò⟩ was used instead of ⟨ɔ⟩ in Mali.
8. ↑↑↑↑ Basque has several digraphs: ⟨dd, ll, rr, ts, tt, tx, tz⟩. The ⟨ü⟩, which represents /ø/, is required for various words in its Zuberoan dialect. ⟨c, q, v, w, y⟩ are used in foreign words, but are officially considered part of the alphabet.
9. ↑↑↑↑ Belarusian also has several digraphs: ⟨ch, dz, dź, dž⟩.
10. ↑↑↑↑ Bislama also has the digraph ⟨ng⟩.
11. ↑↑↑↑ Breton also has the digraphs ⟨ch, c'h, zh⟩. ⟨c, q, x⟩ are used in foreign words or digraphs only.
12. ↑↑↑ Catalan also has a large number of digraphs: ⟨dj, gu, gü, ig, ix, ll, l·l, ny, qu, qü, rr, ss, tg, tj, ts, tx, tz⟩. The letters ⟨k, q, w, y⟩ are only used in loanwords or the digraphs mentioned.
13. ↑↑ The Alphabet of Chad also uses the unique letters ⟨n̰⟩ and ⟨r̰⟩.
14. ↑↑↑ Chamorro also has the digraphs ⟨ch, ng⟩. ⟨c⟩ used only in digraphs.
15. ↑↑↑↑ Corsican has the trigraphs: ⟨chj, ghj⟩.
16. ↑↑↑↑↑↑↑↑ Croatian Gaj's alphabet also has the digraphs: ⟨dž, lj, nj⟩. There are also four tone markers that are sometimes used on vowels to avoid ambiguity in homophones, but this is generally uncommon. Gaj's alphabet has been adopted by the Serbian and Bosnian standards and that it has complete one-to-one congruence with Serbian Cyrillic, where the three digraphs map to Cyrillic letters ⟨џ⟩, ⟨љ⟩ and ⟨њ⟩, respectively. Rarely and non-standardly, digraph ⟨dj⟩ is used instead of ⟨đ⟩ (like it was previously) (Cyrillic ⟨ђ⟩). Montenegrin variant additionally uses ⟨ś⟩ and ⟨ź⟩ to indicate dialectal pronunciation.
17. ↑↑ Cypriot Arabic also has the letters ⟨Θ⟩ and ⟨Δ⟩.
18. ↑↑↑↑ Czech also has the digraph ⟨ch⟩, which is considered a separate letter and is sorted between ⟨h⟩ and ⟨i⟩. While ⟨á, ď, é, ě, í, ň, ó, ť, ú, ů, ý⟩ are considered separate letters, in collation they are treated merely as letters with diacritics. However, ⟨č, ř, š, ž⟩ are sorted as separate letters. ⟨q, w, x⟩ occur only in loanwords.
19. ↑ Dakelh also contains the letter ⟨'⟩, which represents the glottal stop. The letters ⟨f, p, r, v⟩ are only used in loanwords.
20. ↑↑↑↑↑↑ The Norwegian alphabet is currently identical with the Danish alphabet. ⟨c⟩ is part of both alphabets and is not used in native Danish or Norwegian words (except some proper names), but occurs quite frequently in well-established loanwords in Danish. Norwegian and Danish use ⟨é⟩ in some words such as én, although ⟨é⟩ is considered a diacritic mark, while ⟨å, æ, ø⟩ are letters. ⟨q, w, x, z⟩ are not used except for names and some foreign words.
21. ↑ Dinka also has the digraphs: ⟨dh, nh, ny, th⟩. ⟨h⟩ is only present in these digraphs. Dinka also used the letters ⟨ä, ë, ï, ö, ɛ̈, ɔ̈⟩ (the last two which do not exist as precomposed characters in Unicode)
22. ↑↑↑ The status of ⟨ij⟩ as a letter, ligature or digraph in Dutch is disputed. ⟨c⟩ (outside the digraph ⟨ch⟩), ⟨q⟩, ⟨x⟩, and ⟨y⟩ occur mostly in foreign words. Letters with grave and letters with circumflex occur only in loanwords.
23. ↑↑↑ English generally now uses extended Latin letters only in loan words, such as fiancé, fiancée, and résumé. Rare publication guides may still use the dieresis on words, such as "coöperate", rather than the now-more-common "co-operate" (UK) or "cooperate" (US). For a fuller discussion, see articles branching from Lists of English words of international origin, which was used to determine the diacritics needed for more unambiguous English. However, an ⟨é⟩ or ⟨è⟩ is sometimes used in poetry to show that a normally silent vowel is to be pronounced, as in "blessèd".
24. ↑↑↑↑ Filipino [and also applicable in or to Tagalog, which is the topmost influencer and contributor language of Filipino, among the rest of the other influencer and contributor languages of the Philippines and foreign languages for Filipino's evolution, further development, and further enrichment; it (Tagalog) is also the de facto historical, traditional, and linguistic basis of Filipino and the de jure or official basis of Filipino's both predecessor Philippine national and official language/s or language phase/s or stage/s since 1937 (as a national language) and 1946 (as an official language), which is lastly institutionally, officially, and constitutionally named or renamed as or into Pilipino from 1959 to 1987, before being constitutionally and officially replaced by Filipino as the national and an official language since 1987] also uses the digraph ⟨ng⟩, even originally with a large tilde that spanned both ⟨n⟩ and ⟨g⟩ (as in ⟨n͠g⟩) when a vowel follows the digraph. (The use of the tilde over the two letters is now rare). Among the diacriticized letters, only ⟨ñ⟩ is required for everyday use (only in loanwords). The accented vowels are used in dictionaries to indicate pronunciation, and ⟨g⟩ with tilde is only present in older works. ⟨Ë⟩ and ⟨ë⟩ are new variants of ⟨E⟩ and ⟨e⟩, respectively, and we're introduced in 2013 by the Komisyon sa Wikang Filipino (Commission on the Filipino Language)'s "Ortograpiyang Pambansa" (National Orthography) and in 2014 by the Komisyon sa Wikang Filipino (Commission on the Filipino Language)'s KWF Manwal sa Masinop na Pagsulat (KWF Manual on Provident Writing) to represent and preserve the schwa vowel sound /ə/ in non-Tagalog Filipino words of Philippine origin or from the other languages of the Philippines that natively have this vowel sound in their languages. The letters ⟨c, f, j, q, v, x, z⟩ are used only in loanwords (sometimes also in Spanish-styled spellings of proper names). Waray uses the same spelling conventions; ⟨e⟩ is also used only in loanwords in Waray, but the Waray alphabet, being the same as the Filipino alphabet, has all 26 letters of the ISO Basic Latin alphabet.
25. ↑↑↑ Uppercase diacritics in French are often (incorrectly) thought of as being optional, but the official rules of French orthography designate accents on uppercase letters as obligatory in most cases. Many pairs or triplets are read as digraphs or trigraphs depending on context, but are not treated as such lexicographically: consonants ⟨ph, (ng), th, gu/gü, qu, ce, ch/(sh/sch), rh⟩; vocal vowels ⟨(ee), ai/ay, ei/ey, eu, au/eau, ou⟩; nasal vowels ⟨ain/aim, in/im/ein, un/um/eun, an/am, en/em, om/on⟩; the half-consonant -⟨(i)ll⟩-; half-consonant and vowel pairs ⟨oi, oin/ouin, ien, ion⟩. When rules that govern the French orthography are not observed, they are read as separate letters, or using an approximating phonology of a foreign language for loan words, and there are many exceptions. In addition, most final consonants are mute (including those consonants that are part of feminine, plural, and conjugation endings). ⟨ÿ⟩ and ⟨ü⟩ are only used in certain geographical names and proper names plus their derivatives, or, in the case of ⟨ü⟩ with diaeresis, newly proposed reforms, e.g. capharnaüm 'shambles' is derived from the proper name Capharnaüm. ⟨æ⟩ occurs only in Latin or Greek loanwords.
26. ↑ Fula has ⟨x⟩ as part of the alphabet in all countries except Guinea, Guinea-Bissau, Liberia, and Sierra Leone (used only in loanwords in these countries). ⟨ɠ⟩, which is used only in loanwords (but still part of the alphabet), is used in Guinea only. Fula also uses the digraphs ⟨mb⟩ (In Guinea spelled ⟨mb⟩), ⟨nd, ng, nj⟩. ⟨aa, ee, ii, oo, uu⟩ are part of the alphabet in all countries except Guinea, Guinea-Bissau, Liberia, and Sierra Leone. ⟨ƴ⟩ is used in all countries except for Nigeria, where it is written ⟨'y⟩. ⟨ ŋ⟩ is used in all countries except for Nigeria. ⟨ɲ⟩ is used in Guinea, Mali, and Burkina Faso, ⟨ñ⟩ is used in Senegal, Gambia, Mauritania, Guinea-Bissau, Liberia, and Sierra Leone, and the digraph ⟨ny⟩ is used in Niger, Cameroon, Chad, Central African Republic, and Nigeria. The apostrophe is a letter (representing the glottal stop) in Guinea-Bissau, Liberia, and Sierra Leone. ⟨q, v, z⟩ are only used in loanwords, and are not part of the alphabet.
27. ↑↑↑↑ Galician. The standard of 1982 set also the digraphs gu, qu (both always before ⟨e⟩ and ⟨i⟩), ch, ll, nh and rr. In addition, the standard of 2003 added the grapheme ⟨ao⟩ as an alternative writing of ⟨ó⟩. Although not marked (or forgotten) in the list of digraphs, they are used to represent the same sound, so the sequence ⟨ao⟩ should be considered as a digraph. The sequence ⟨nh⟩ represents a velar nasal (not a palatal as in Portuguese) and is restricted only to three feminine words, being either demonstrative or pronoun: unha ('a' and 'one'), algunha ('some') and ningunha ('not one'). The Galician reintegracionismo movement uses it as in Portuguese. ⟨j⟩ (outside of the Limia Baixa region), ⟨k⟩, ⟨w⟩, and ⟨y⟩ are only used in loanwords, and are not part of the alphabet.
28. ↑↑↑↑ German also retains most original letters in French loan words. Swiss German does not use ⟨ß⟩ any more. The long s ⟨ſ⟩ was in use until the mid-20th century. ⟨sch⟩ is usually not considered a separate letter, neither are the digraphs ⟨ch, ck, st, sp, th, (ph, rh), qu⟩. ⟨q⟩ only appears in the sequence ⟨qu⟩ and in loanwords, while ⟨x⟩ and ⟨y⟩ are found almost only in loan words. The capital ⟨ß⟩ (⟨ẞ⟩) is almost never used. The accented letters (other than the letters ⟨ä⟩, ⟨ö⟩, ⟨ü⟩, and ⟨ß⟩) are used only in loanwords.
29. ↑↑↑↑ Guaraní also uses digraphs ⟨ch, mb, nd, ng, nt, rr⟩ and the glottal stop ⟨'⟩. ⟨b, c, d⟩ are only used in these digraphs.
30. ↑ Gwich'in also contains the letter ⟨'⟩, which represents the glottal stop. Gwich'in also uses the letters ⟨ą̀, ę̀, į̀, ǫ̀, ų̀⟩, which are not available as precomposed characters in Unicode. Gwich'in also uses the digraphs and trigraphs: ⟨aa, ąą, àà, ą̀ą̀, ch, ch', ddh, dh, dl, dr, dz, ee, ęę, èè, ę̀ę̀, gh, ghw, gw, ii, įį, ìì, į̀į̀, kh, kw, k', nd, nh, nj, oo, ǫǫ, òò, ǫ̀ǫ̀, rh, sh, shr, th, tl, tl', tr, tr', ts, ts', tth, tth', t', uu, ųų, ùù, ų̀ų̀, zh, zhr⟩. The letter ⟨c⟩ is only used the digraphs above. ⟨b, f, m⟩ are only used in loanwords.
31. ↑↑↑↑ Hausa has the digraphs: ⟨sh, ts⟩. Vowel length and tone are usually not marked. Textbooks usually use macron or doubled vowel to mark the length, grave to mark the low tone and circumflex to mark the falling tone. Therefore, in some systems, it is possible that macron is used in combination with grave or circumflex over a, e, i, o or u. The letter ⟨p⟩ is only used in loanwords.
32. ↑↑↑↑ Hungarian also has the digraphs: ⟨cs, dz, gy, ly, ny, sz, ty, zs⟩; and the trigraph: ⟨dzs⟩. ⟨á, é, í, ó, ő, ú, ű⟩ are considered separate letters, but are collated as variants of ⟨a, e, i, o, ö, u, ü⟩.
33. ↑↑↑↑ Irish traditionally used the dot diacritic (Irish: ponc séimhithe) to mark lenition, forming the dotted letters (litreacha buailte "struck letters") ⟨ḃ, ċ, ḋ, ḟ, ġ, ṁ, ṗ, ṡ, ṫ⟩. These have largely been replaced by the digraphs: ⟨bh, ch, dh, fh, gh, mh, ph, sh, th⟩ except for in decorative or self-consciously traditional contexts. ⟨v⟩ occurs in a small number of (mainly onomatopoeic) native words (e.g. vácarnach "to quack") and colloquialisms (vís for bís "screw"). ⟨j, k, q, w, x, y, z⟩ are "uncommon letters" that only occur in loanwords and scientific terminology.
34. ↑ Igbo writes ⟨ṅ⟩ alternatively as ⟨n̄⟩. Igbo has the digraphs: ⟨ch, gb, gh, gw, kp, kw, nw, ny, sh⟩. ⟨c⟩ is only used in the digraph before. Also, vowels take a grave accent, an acute accent, or no accent, depending on tone.
35. ↑↑↑↑ Italian also has the digraphs: ⟨ch, gh, gn, gl, sc⟩. ⟨j, k, w, x, y⟩ are used in foreign words, and are not part of the alphabet. ⟨x⟩ is also used for native words derived from Latin and Greek; ⟨j⟩ is also used for just a few native words, mainly names of persons (as in Jacopo) or of places (as in Jesolo and Jesi), in which represents /i/. While it does not occur in ordinary running texts, geographical names on maps are often written only with acute accents. The circumflex is used on an -i ending that was anciently written -ii (or -ji, -ij, -j, etc.) to distinguish homograph plurals and verb forms: e.g. principî form principi, genî from geni.
36. ↑ Karakalpak also has the digraphs: ⟨ch, sh⟩. ⟨c, f, v⟩ are used in foreign words.
37. ↑ Kazakh also has the digraphs: ⟨ia, io, iu⟩. ⟨f, h, v⟩ and the digraph ⟨io⟩ are used in foreign words.
38. ↑↑↑↑ Latvian also has the digraphs: ⟨dz, dž, ie⟩. Dz and dž are occasionally considered separate letters of the alphabet in more archaic examples, which have been published as recently as the 1950s; however, modern alphabets and teachings discourage this due to an ongoing effort to set decisive rules for Latvian and eliminate barbaric words accumulated during the Soviet occupation. The digraph "ie" is never considered a separate letter. Ō, Ŗ, and the digraphs CH (only used in loanwords) and UO are no longer part of the alphabet, but are still used in certain dialects and newspapers that use the old orthography. Y is used only in certain dialects and not in the standard language. F and H are only used in loanwords.
39. ↑↑↑↑ A nearby language, Pite Sami, uses Lule Sami orthography but also includes the letters ⟨đ⟩ and ⟨ŧ⟩, which are not in Lule Sami.
40. ↑↑↑↑ Lithuanian also has the digraphs: ⟨ch, dz, dž, ie, uo⟩. However, these are not considered separate letters of the alphabet. F, H, and the digraph CH are only used in loanwords. Demanding publications such as dictionaries, maps, schoolbooks etc. need additional diacritical marks to differentiate homographs. Using grave accent on A, E, I, O, U, acute accent on all vowels, and tilde accent on all vowels and on L, M, N and R. Small E and I (also with ogonek) must retain the dot when additional accent mark is added to the character; the use of ì and í (with missing dot) is considered unacceptable.
41. ↑↑↑↑ In Livonian, the letters Ö, Ȫ, Y, Ȳ were used by the older generation, but the younger generation merged these sounds; Around the late 1990s, these letters were removed from the alphabet.
42. ↑↑↑↑ Maltese also has the digraphs: ⟨ie, għ⟩.
43. ↑ Māori only uses ⟨g⟩ in ⟨ng⟩ digraph. ⟨wh⟩ is also a digraph.
44. ↑↑↑↑ Marshallese often uses the old orthography (because people did not approve of the new orthography), which writes ļ as l, m̧ as m, ņ as n, p as b, o̧ as o at the ends of words or in the word yokwe (also spelled iakwe under the old orthography; under the new orthography, spelled io̧kwe), but a at other places, and d as dr before vowels, or r after vowels. The old orthography writes ā as e in some words, but ā in others; it also writes ū as i between consonants. The old orthography writes geminates and long vowels as two letters instead. Allophones of /ɘ/, written as only e o ō in the new orthography, are also written as i u and very rarely, ū. The letter Y only occurs in the words yokwe or the phrase yokwe yuk (also spelled iakwe iuk in the old orthography or io̧kwe eok in the new orthography).
45. ↑↑↑ Massachusett also uses the digraphs ⟨ch, ee, sh, ty⟩ and the letter ⟨8⟩ (which was previously written ⟨oo⟩). ⟨c⟩ is only used in the digraph ⟨ch⟩.
46. ↑ Some Mohawk speakers use orthographic ⟨i⟩ in place of the consonant ⟨y⟩. The glottal stop is indicated with an apostrophe ⟨'⟩ and long vowels are written with a colon ⟨:⟩.
47. ↑ Na'vi uses the letter ʼ and the digraphs aw, ay, ew, ey, kx, ll, ng (sometimes written ⟨g⟩), px, rr, ts (sometimes written ⟨c⟩), tx. ⟨g⟩ (in standard orthography) and ⟨x⟩ are used only in digraphs.
48. ↑ Oromo uses the following digraphs: ⟨ch, dh, ny, ph, sh⟩. ⟨p⟩ is only used in the digraph ⟨ph⟩ and loanwords. ⟨v⟩ and ⟨z⟩ are only used in loanwords.
49. ↑↑↑↑ Papiamento also has the digraphs: ⟨ch, dj, sh, zj⟩. ⟨q, x⟩ are only used in loanwords and proper names. ⟨j⟩ is only used in digraphs, loanwords, and proper names. Papiamentu in Bonaire and Curaçao is different from Papiamento in Aruba in the following ways: Papiamento in Aruba uses a more etymological spelling, so Papiamento uses ⟨c⟩ in native words outside of the digraph ⟨ch⟩, but Papiamentu in Bonaire and Curaçao does not. Papiamentu in Bonaire and Curaçao uses ⟨è⟩, ⟨ò⟩, ⟨ù⟩, and ⟨ü⟩ for various sounds and ⟨á, é, í, ó, ú⟩ for stress, but Papiamento in Aruba does not use these letters.
50. ↑ Piedmontese also uses the letter ⟨n-⟩, which usually precedes a vowel, as in lun-a "moon".
51. ↑↑↑↑ Pinyin has four tone markers that can go on top of any of the six vowels (⟨a, e, i, o, u, ü⟩); e.g.: macron (⟨ā, ē, ī, ō, ū, ǖ⟩), acute accent (⟨á, é, í, ó, ú, ǘ⟩), caron (⟨ǎ, ě, ǐ, ǒ, ǔ, ǚ⟩), grave accent (⟨à, è, ì, ò, ù, ǜ⟩). It also uses the digraphs: ⟨ch, sh, zh⟩.
52. ↑↑↑↑ Polish also has the digraphs: ⟨ch, cz, dz, dż, dź, sz, rz⟩. ⟨q, v, x⟩ are part of the extended Polish alphabet, but are only used in loanwords (and are often replaced by ⟨k(w), w, ks/gz⟩ respectively).
53. ↑↑↑↑ Portuguese uses the digraphs ⟨ch, lh, nh, rr, ss⟩. The trema on ⟨ü⟩ was used in Brazilian Portuguese from 1943 to 2009. European Portuguese in that case used the grave accent (⟨ù⟩) from 1911 to 1920, then abolished. The grave accent was used on ⟨e, i, o, u⟩, until 1973. ⟨è, ò⟩ are used in geographical names outside Europe and not part of the language proper. The now abandoned practice was to indicate underlying stress in words with suffixes that begin with -z or in words ending in -mente, e.g. cafèzeiro, açaìzal, sòmente, ùltimamente etc. The trema on ⟨ï⟩ could be used to mark not stressed hiatuses, e.g. constituïção, although this use was only optional and applied to ⟨ü⟩ too. Neither the digraphs nor accented letters are considered part of the alphabet. ⟨k, w, y⟩ occur only in loanwords, and were not letters of the alphabet from 1911 (Portugal) or 1943 (Brazil) until 2009, but these letters were in fact used before 1911 in Portugal and before 1943 in Brazil when the word's etymology allowed, e.g. kilometro, sandwiche, typo etc. (although ⟨w⟩ was formally not included in the alphabet).
54. ↑↑↑↑ Romani has the digraphs: ⟨čh, dž, kh, ph, th⟩.
55. ↑ Romanian normally uses the letters ⟨ș, ț⟩ (⟨s, t⟩ with a comma diacritic below) but they are frequently replaced by ⟨ş, ţ⟩ (⟨s, t⟩ with a cedilla) due to past lack of standardization. ⟨k, q, w, x, y⟩ occur only in loanwords.
56. ↑↑↑ Slovak also has the digraphs ⟨dz, dž, ch⟩ which are considered separate letters. While ⟨á, ä, ď, é, í, ĺ, ň, ó, ô, ŕ, ť, ú', ý⟩ are considered separate letters, in collation they are treated merely as letters with diacritics. However, ⟨č, ľ, š, ž⟩, as well as the digraphs, are actually sorted as separate letters. ⟨q, w, x, ö, ü⟩ occur only in loanwords.
57. ↑↑↑↑↑ Sorbian also uses the digraphs: ⟨ch⟩, ⟨dź⟩. ⟨ř⟩ is only used in Upper Sorbian, and ⟨ŕ⟩, ⟨ś⟩, and ⟨ź⟩ (outside the digraph ⟨dź⟩) are only used in Lower Sorbian.
58. ↑↑↑ Spanish uses several digraphs to represent single sounds: ⟨ch⟩, ⟨gu⟩ (preceding ⟨e⟩ or ⟨i⟩), ⟨ll⟩, ⟨qu⟩, ⟨rr⟩; of these, the digraphs ⟨ch⟩ and ⟨ll⟩ were traditionally considered individual letters with their own name (che, elle) and place in the alphabet (after ⟨c⟩ and ⟨l⟩, respectively), but in order to facilitate international compatibility the Royal Spanish Academy decided to cease this practice in 1994 and all digraphs are now collated as combinations of two separate characters. While cedilla is etymologically Spanish diminutive of ceda (⟨z⟩) and Sancho Pança is the original form in Cervantes books, C with cedilla ⟨ç⟩ is now completely displaced by ⟨z⟩ in contemporary language. In poetry, the diaeresis may be used to break a diphthong into separate vowels. Regarding that usage, Ortografía de la lengua española states that "diaeresis is usually placed over the closed vowel [i.e. ⟨i⟩ or ⟨u⟩] and, when both are closed, generally over the first". In this context, the use of ⟨ï⟩ is rare, but part of the normative orthography.
59. ↑ Swedish uses ⟨é⟩ in well integrated loan words like idé and armé, although ⟨é⟩ is considered a modified ⟨e⟩, while ⟨å⟩, ⟨ä⟩, ⟨ö⟩ are letters. ⟨á⟩ and ⟨à⟩ are rarely used words. ⟨w⟩ and ⟨z⟩ are used in some integrated words like webb and zon. ⟨q⟩, ⟨ü⟩, ⟨è⟩, and ⟨ë⟩ are used for names only, but exist in Swedish names. For foreign names ⟨ó⟩, ⟨ç⟩, ⟨ñ⟩ and more are sometimes used, but usually not. Swedish has many digraphs and some trigraphs. ⟨ch, dj, lj, rl, rn, rs, sj, sk, si, ti, sch, skj, stj⟩ and others are usually pronounced as one sound.
60. ↑↑↑↑ Tswana also has the digraphs: ⟨kg, kh, ng, ph, th, tl, tlh, ts, tsh, tš, tšh⟩. The letters ⟨c⟩, ⟨q⟩, and ⟨x⟩ only appear in onomatopoeic and loanwords. The letters ⟨v⟩ and ⟨z⟩ only appear in loanwords.
61. ↑↑↑↑ Turkmen had a slightly different alphabet in 1993–1995 (which used some rare letters) ⟨ý⟩ was written as ⟨ÿ⟩ (capital ⟨¥⟩), ⟨ň⟩ as ⟨ñ⟩, ⟨ş⟩ as ⟨¢⟩ (capital ⟨$⟩), and ⟨ž⟩ as ⟨⌠⟩ (capital ⟨£⟩) (so that all characters were available in Code page 437). In the new alphabet, all characters are available in ISO/IEC 8859-2.
62. ↑↑↑ Ulithian also has the digraphs: ⟨ch, l', mw, ng⟩. ⟨c⟩ is used only in digraphs.
63. ↑ Uzbek also has the digraphs: ⟨ch, ng, sh⟩ considered as letters. ⟨c⟩ is used only in digraphs. ⟨g'⟩, ⟨o'⟩ and apostrophe ⟨'⟩ are considered as letters. These letters have preferred typographical variants: ⟨gʻ⟩, ⟨oʻ⟩, and ⟨ʼ⟩ respectively.
64. ↑↑↑↑ Venda also has the digraphs and trigraphs: ⟨bv, bw, dz, dzh, dzw, fh, hw, kh, khw, ng, ny, nz, ṅw, ph, pf, pfh, sh, sw, th, ts, tsh, tsw, ty, ṱh, vh, zh, zw⟩. ⟨c, j, q⟩ are used in foreign words.
65. ↑↑↑↑ Vietnamese has seven additional base letters: ⟨ă â đ ê ô ơ ư⟩. It uses five tone markers that can go on top (or below) any of the 12 vowels (⟨a, ă, â, e, ê, i, o, ô, ơ, u, ư, y⟩); e.g.: grave accent (⟨à, ằ, ầ, è, ề, ì, ò, ồ, ờ, ù, ừ, ỳ⟩), hook above (⟨ả, ẳ, ẩ, ẻ, ể, ỉ, ỏ, ổ, ở, ủ, ử, ỷ⟩), tilde (⟨ã, ẵ, ẫ, ẽ, ễ, ĩ, õ, ỗ, ỡ, ũ, ữ, ỹ⟩), acute accent (⟨á, ắ, ấ, é, ế, í, ó, ố, ớ, ú, ứ, ý⟩), and dot below (⟨ạ, ặ, ậ, ẹ, ệ, ị, ọ, ộ, ợ, ụ, ự, ỵ⟩). It also uses several digraphs and trigraphs ⟨ch, gh, gi, kh, ng, ngh, nh, ph, th, tr⟩ but they are no longer considered letters.
66. ↑↑↑↑ Walloon has the digraphs and trigraphs: ⟨ae, ch, dj, ea, jh, oe, oen, oi, sch, sh, tch, xh⟩. The letter ⟨x⟩ outside the digraph ⟨xh⟩ is in some orthographies, but not the default two. The letter ⟨q⟩ is in some orthographies, but not in the default two. Also in some orthographies are ⟨à⟩, ⟨ì⟩, ⟨ù⟩, and even ⟨e̊⟩ and ⟨o̊⟩ (which are not available as a precomposed character in Unicode, so ⟨ë⟩ and ⟨ö⟩ are used as substitutes)
67. ↑↑↑↑ Welsh has the digraphs ⟨ch⟩, ⟨dd⟩, ⟨ff⟩, ⟨ng⟩, ⟨ll⟩, ⟨ph⟩, ⟨rh⟩, ⟨th⟩. Each of these digraphs is collated as a separate letter, and ⟨ng⟩ comes immediately after ⟨g⟩ in the alphabet. It also frequently uses circumflexes, and occasionally uses diaereses, acute accents and grave accents, on its seven vowels (⟨a, e, i, o, u, w, y⟩), but accented characters are not regarded as separate letters of the alphabet.
68. ↑↑↑↑ Xhosa has a large number of digraphs, trigraphs, and even one tetragraph are used to represent various phonemes: ⟨bh, ch, dl, dy, dz, gc, gq, gr, gx, hh, hl, kh, kr, lh, mb, mf, mh, nc, ndl, ndz, ng, ng', ngc, ngh, ngq, ngx, nh, nkc, nkq, nkx, nq, nx, ntl, ny, nyh, ph, qh, rh, sh, th, ths, thsh, ts, tsh, ty, tyh, wh, xh, yh, zh⟩. It also occasionally uses acute accents, grave accents, circumflexes, and diaereses on its five vowels (⟨a, e, i, o, u⟩), but accented characters are not regarded as separate letters of the alphabet.
69. ↑↑↑ Yapese has the digraphs and trigraphs: ⟨aa, ae, ch, ea, ee, ii, k', l', m', n', ng, ng', oe, oo, p', t', th, th', uu, w', y'⟩. ⟨q⟩, representing the glottal stop, is not always used. Often an apostrophe is used to represent the glottal stop instead. ⟨c⟩ is used only in digraphs. ⟨h⟩ is used only in digraphs and loanwords. ⟨q⟩ is used only in loanwords.
70. ↑↑↑↑ Yoruba uses the digraph ⟨gb⟩. Also, vowels take a grave accent, an acute accent, or no accent, depending on tone. Although the "dot below" diacritic is widely used, purists prefer a short vertical underbar (Unicode COMBINING VERTICAL LINE BELOW U+0329) - this resembles the IPA notation for a syllabic consonant, attached to the base of the letter (⟨e⟩, ⟨o⟩ or ⟨s⟩). The seven Yoruba vowels (⟨a⟩, ⟨e⟩, ⟨ẹ⟩, ⟨i⟩, ⟨o⟩, ⟨ọ⟩, ⟨u⟩) can be uttered in three different tones: high (acute accent); middle (no accent) and low (grave accent). The letters ⟨m⟩ and ⟨n⟩, when written without diacritics, indicate nasalisation of the preceding vowel. ⟨m⟩ and ⟨n⟩ also occur as syllabics - in these circumstances, they take acute or grave tonal diacritics, like the vowels. Middle tone is marked with a macron to differentiate it from the unmarked nasalising consonants. A tilde was used in older orthography (still occasionally used) to indicate a double vowel. This is tonally ambiguous, and has now been replaced by showing the paired vowels, each marked with the appropriate tones. However, where a double vowel has the tonal sequence high-low or low-high, it may optionally be replaced by a single vowel with a circumflex (high-low) or caron (low-high), e.g. á + à = ⟨â⟩; à + á = ⟨ǎ⟩.
71. ↑↑ Zuni contains the glottal stop ⟨'⟩ and the digraph: ⟨ch⟩; ⟨c⟩ is only used in that digraph. The other digraphs ⟨kw⟩, ⟨sh⟩, and ⟨ts⟩ are not part of the alphabet.

== Miscellaneous ==
- Africa Alphabet
- African reference alphabet
- Calculator spelling – Method of writing text on seven-segment displays
- Gaj's Latin alphabet, is the only script of both the Croatian and Bosniak standard languages in current use, and one of the two scripts of both the Serbian and Montenegrin standard languages alongside the Cyrillic alphabet.
- Initial Teaching Alphabet
- International Phonetic Alphabet
- Łatynka for Ukrainian
- Leet (1337 alphabet)
- Romani alphabet for most Romani languages
- Sámi Latin alphabet
- Standard Alphabet by Lepsius
- Tatar alphabet, similar to Turkish alphabet and Jaꞑalif as a part of Uniform Turkic alphabet
- Uralic Phonetic Alphabet

== See also ==
- Diacritic
- Latin-script alphabet
- Latin-script multigraph
- Latin script in Unicode
- Ligature
- List of Latin-script letters
- List of precomposed Latin characters in Unicode
- Romanization
- Writing systems of Africa

Categories

- Letters with diacritics
- Latin-script ligatures
- Phonetic transcription symbols
