= Tetun =

Tetun (also spelled Tetum) may refer to:

- Tetun language, an Austronesian language
  - Tetun alphabet, used to write the Tetun language
- Tetun people, an ethnic group of East Timor and Indonesia
