= Papiamento orthography =

Two Latin-based writing systems of Papiamento

Papiamento has two standardised orthographies, one used on the island of Aruba and the other on the islands of Curaçao and Bonaire. The Aruban orthography is more etymological in nature, while the other is more phonemic. Among the differences between the two standards, one obvious difference is the way the name of the language is written. In Aruba it is written Papiamento, while in Curaçao and Bonaire it is written Papiamentu. The governments of Curaçao and Aruba formally standardised orthographic rules in 1976 and 1977, respectively.

== History ==
=== Development ===
The first efforts to formalise the language began in the early 1970s, with the first step made in 1969 in Curaçao. R.G. Römer presented to the Central Government of the Netherlands Antilles his Ontwerp van een spelling voor het Papyamento (Draft of a spelling for Papyamento). In 1970 the Maduro Commission consisting of eight members, R.G. Römer included, was formed. With a modified proposition, they presented their recommendations to the Minister of Education of the Netherlands Antilles. With further revision, the minister's recommendations were passed onto the Deputy of Education of Curaçao in 1975. Here a Jonis Commission was formed to advise the Curaçaoan government on the didactic aspects of the Römer-Maduro orthography. It was also in 1975 that the Central Government decided that each island within the Netherlands Antilles could choose their orthography. In 1976, Curaçao officially adopted the Römer-Maduro-Jonis version while Aruba had approved a version presented by the Comision di Ortografia (Orthography Commission) presided by Jossy Mansur. This was officially adopted in 1977.

After official approval, both islands embarked on programs to promote the language. A commission including Maduro and Jonis of previous commissions was appointed the task of publishing a new version of the Curaçaoan orthography, which appeared in 1983. While interest in the language seemed to grow, problems arose in Aruba. Rules seemed unclear and not comprehensive in certain areas. In 1992 this prompted the Minister of Welfare to name a commission with the purpose of clarification and reform of the Aruban orthography. The commission delivered its findings later that year. Three years later the Aruban government relayed these findings to a number of institutions for analysis and to gather input. In the course of a year, the Government collected the recommendations it had received and in 1997 the Ministry of Education and Labour named a second commission to analyse and incorporate the relevant annotations. Their findings were presented to the ministry later that year. It was near the end of 2006 when the Ministry of Education had inventarised all additional recommendations and the official version which takes these into account was published the next year.

=== Recognition ===
Throughout this process of reform of the language's orthography were elevations in formal recognition of the language. The Algemene wet bestuursrecht (General administrative law) of the Netherlands was reformed in 1995 in great part to allow the use of the West Frisian language in governmental administration within the province of Friesland. This reform also allowed Papiamento and English to be used alongside Dutch within Aruba and the islands of the Netherlands Antilles. In 2003 the Aruban government passed a law concerning the official language of the island, making Papiamento and Dutch the official languages of Aruba. Four years later in 2007, the government of the Netherlands Antilles passed a similar law making Papiamentu, Dutch and English the official languages of the islands. With the dissolution of the Netherlands Antilles in 2010, the government of the Netherlands has maintained the official status of Papiamentu, English and Dutch in the Caribbean Netherlands. The official languages of Curaçao since then remain Papiamentu and Dutch.

== Alphabet ==
Papiamento/u Alphabet
Letter	A	B	C	D	E	F	G	H	I
Name	a	be	ce / se	de	e	ef / èf	ge	ha	i
Letter	J	K	L	M	N	Ñ	O	P	Q
Name	ye	ka	el / èl	em / èm	en / èn	eñe	o	pe	ku / kü
Letter	R	S	T	U	V	W	X	Y	Z
Name	er / èr	es / ès	te	u	ve	we	eks	igrek / igrèk	zet / zèt

== Spelling-to-sound correspondences ==
=== Vowels and vowel combinations ===
Spelling		Value in Papiamento (Aruba) (IPA)	Examples	Value in Papiamentu (Curaçao, Bonaire) (IPA)	Examples	Exceptions
a		/a/	algun, cas, ora	/a/	antes, banko, dobla	
ai		/ai̯/	baile	/ai̯/	gai	In Papiamento, rewritten -⟨ay⟩ when at the end of a word.
au		/au̯/	aumenta	/au̯/	aunke	
e	(often) stressed	/e/	regla, centro	/e/	tres, pone	
e	unstressed	/ə/	tiger, separabel	/ə/	mangel, agradabel	
e	in loan words	/ɛ/	letter			
è^{a}				/ɛ/	kèlki, skèr	
ei^{b}		/ɛi̯/	feita, reina	/ɛi̯/	kabei, preis	Pronounced /ei̯/ in words incorporating the word ei, meaning there. In Papiamento, -⟨ei⟩ is rewritten -⟨ey⟩ when at the end of a word.
eu		/eu̯/	leu	/eu̯/	pareu	
i	elsewhere	/i/	igual, skirbi	/i/	tin, bini	
i	unstressed before vowel	/j/	papia, ciudad	/j/	kambio, bientu	
iau				/i̯au̯/	miau	
ieu		/i̯eu̯/	bieu	/i̯eu̯/	pieu	
iou^{b}				/i̯ɔu̯/	bakiou	
o		/o/ /ɔ/	solo, cos dobel	/o/	toro, otro	
ò^{a}				/ɔ/	bòl, sòpi	
oi				/oi̯/	roi	In Papiamento, rewritten -⟨oy⟩ when at the end of a word.
òi^{a}				/ɔi̯/	plòis	
ou^{b}		/ɔu̯/	cambou	/ɔu̯/	blou, Kòrsou	
u	elsewhere	/u/ /ʏ/	cura, mesun augustus	/u/	buki, tur	
u	unstressed before vowel	/w/	pueblo, cuida	/w/	kuater, fuerte	Where ⟨gui⟩ and ⟨gue⟩ are written, the ⟨u⟩ is silent. In Papiamento, -⟨ui⟩ is rewritten -⟨uy⟩ when at the end of a word.
ù^{a}				/ʏ/	bùs, yùfrou	
ùi				/ʏi̯/	brùin, flùit	
ü^{a}				/y/	hür	
uai				/u̯ai̯/	zuai	
uei^{b}				/u̯ɛi̯/	zuei	
y^{c}		/i/	y			

- ^a ⟨e⟩, ⟨o⟩ and ⟨u⟩ are not modified in Papiamento (Aruba) to represent the sounds [ɛ], [ɔ], [ʏ] or [y].
- ^b Provided the frequency with which ⟨ei⟩ and ⟨ou⟩ appear in Papiamentu (Curaçao, Bonaire), it is not required to use the grave accent, i.e. ⟨èi⟩ or ⟨òu⟩ when [ɛi̯] or [ɔw] is heard.
- ^c The word y (meaning 'and') is the only example of ⟨y⟩ as a vowel and only appears in Papiamento (in Papiamentu, the word is written as i).

==== Double vowels and diphthongs ====
Diphthongs
descending
[ai̯]	baile	'dance'	[au̯]	fauna	'fauna'
[ei̯]	esei	'that (there)'	[ɛi̯]	preis	'price'
[eu̯]	leu	'far'	[ɔi̯]	djòin	'join'
[oi̯]	morkoi	'tortoise'	[ɔu̯]	abou	'down'
[ʏi̯]	dùim	'thumb'			
ascending
[ja]	rabia	'anger'	[wa]	suave	'smooth'
[je]	piedra	'rock'	[we]	prueba	'proof'
			[wi]	ruina	'ruin'
[jo]	avion	'aeroplane'	[wo]	residuo	'residue'
[ju]	viuda	'widow'			

In Papiamento, vowels appear in succession only when each is pronounced separately e.g. reeduca (to reeducate). This rule is part of Papiamentu orthography as well. Moreover, in Papiamentu a diaeresis or trema ⟨¨⟩, as may be used in the language of origin of various loan words, is never used to distinguish separate sounds like in Dutch (ideeën) or Spanish (vergüenza).

Diphthongs can be categorised as descending or ascending. Both dialects have eight ascending and eight descending, Papiamentu having nine of the latter as [ɔi̯] is unique to this dialect. The difference is a matter of pronunciation and, in Papiamentu, a matter of accent placement on the stressed syllable.

==== Semivowels ====
In the orthographies of both dialects, words beginning with an ascending diphthong, e.g. ⟨ia⟩ or ⟨uo⟩, are never written with ⟨i⟩ or ⟨u⟩, respectively. These are always rewritten with a ⟨y⟩ for ⟨i⟩ and ⟨w⟩ for ⟨u⟩, e.g. yabi ('key') and not iabi, wowo ('eye') and not uowo (or uouo for that matter). Moreover, ⟨y⟩ is never written between ⟨i⟩ and another vowel, nor is ⟨w⟩ ever written between ⟨u⟩ and another vowel. Few exceptions exist and while in the Aruban dialect words like miyon ('million'), where the ⟨y⟩ substitutes the ⟨ll⟩ from the original Spanish word millón, are considered correct, in Papiamentu they are not and are written without the ⟨y⟩ (mion).

==== Modified vowels ====
Beside the vowels ⟨a⟩, ⟨e⟩, ⟨i⟩, ⟨o⟩ and ⟨u⟩, the Papiamentu orthography further distinguishes between the ⟨e⟩-sounds [e] and [ɛ], ⟨o⟩-sounds [o] and [ɔ], and ⟨u⟩-sounds [u] and [ʏ] through use of the grave accent ⟨`⟩. The letters ⟨è⟩, ⟨ò⟩ and ⟨ù⟩ represent the sounds [ɛ], [ɔ] and [ʏ] respectively. Moreover, to represent the ⟨uu⟩ sound, i.e. [y] in Dutch loan words like huur ('rent') and zuur ('sour'), the ⟨uu⟩ is rewritten as ⟨ü⟩ in Papiamentu (hür, zür) to comply with the rule regarding double vowels and the phonemic consistency as a whole. The sounds [ɛ] and [ɔ] appear often in Papiamentu. To reduce the excessive appearance of the grave accent, it is not required to use it in the diphthongs ⟨ei⟩ and ⟨ou⟩, nor is it incorrect to omit the accent when the letters are capitalised, e.g. Kòrsou, KORSOU ('Curaçao').

The orthography of the Aruban dialect makes no use of accents or diaeresis and while the spelling of loan words is adjusted when possible, often it is retained as in their original language.

=== Consonants and consonant combinations ===
Spelling		Value in Papiamento (Aruba) (IPA)	Examples	Value in Papiamentu (Curaçao, Bonaire) (IPA)	Examples	Exceptions
b		/b/	bala, caba	/b/	bibu, fabor	
c^{a}	before ⟨e⟩, ⟨i⟩	/s/	merece, haci	/s/	Cecilia	In Papiamento, the ⟨c⟩ has a /ʃ/ sound in words ending in -cion.
c^{a}	elsewhere	/k/	caminda, cla	/k/	Caracas	
ch^{b}		/tʃ/	chikito	/tʃ/	chapi	
d		/d/	documento, dal	/d/	duru, dede	In Papiamento, the ⟨d⟩ has a /t/ sound when final in words ending in -dad, -tad, -tud. In Papiamentu, they are written as -dat, -tat and -tut.
dj^{b}		/dʒ/	djaca	/dʒ/	djente	
f		/f/	fama	/f/	fòrki	
g	before ⟨e⟩, ⟨i⟩, final	/x/	gesto, mag	/x/	margen, brùg	
g	before unstressed ⟨e⟩, elsewhere	/ɡ/	garganta, sanger	/ɡ/	gosa, mangel	
h		/h/	hasta, habilidad	/h/	hari, heru	
j^{a}		/j/ /x/	jong, jas Juan	/j/ /x/	Jan Thiel; Julia	Some places still maintain their old spelling, e.g. Salinja. Here the ⟨nj⟩ is pronounced /ɲ/.
k		/k/	kishiki, kere	/k/	kenta, sekreto	
l		/l/	lista, laba	/l/	lesa, kla	
m		/m/	mucha, premio	/m/	man, lampi	
n	before ⟨co⟩, ⟨cu⟩, ⟨g⟩, ⟨k⟩, final except after stressed vowel	/ŋ/	mango, pan	/ŋ/	anker, bon	In Papiamento, ⟨c⟩ followed by ⟨o⟩ or ⟨u⟩ would be pronounced as a /k/ (see below), thus having the same effect on the ⟨n⟩ as ⟨k⟩ would.
n	elsewhere	/n/	natural, tene, algun	/n/	nechi, hende, tempran	
ñ		/ɲ/	aña, soño	/ɲ/	baña, ñapa	
p		/p/	pipa, adopta	/p/	palu, sapu	
q^{a}		/k/	quesillo	/k/	Quebec	
r		/r/	tera, rosa	/r/	barba, poder	
s		/s/	saya, sucu	/s/	krus, pasa	In Papiamento, the ⟨s⟩ has a /ʃ/ sound in words ending in -sion. In Papiamentu, it is written as -shon.
sc		/s/	adolescente, piscina			
sh^{b}		/ʃ/	shimis	/ʃ/	shete	
t		/t/	tin, tata	/t/	trapi, ritmo	
v		/b/ /v/	viuda divorcio	/v/	verbo, vitamina	
w		/w/	wega	/w/	wowo	
x^{a}		/ks/ or /kʃ/	examen, conexion, reflexion	/ks/ or /kʃ/		
y		/j/	yama, haya	/j/	yuda, kayente	
z		/z/	zona	/z/	zeta	In Papiamento, the ⟨z⟩ has a /s/ sound in words ending in -eza, -anza or with a ⟨z⟩. In Papiamentu, they are written as -esa and -ansa.
zj^{b}		/ʒ/	zjeito	/ʒ/	zjar	

- ^a The letter ⟨c⟩ (except the digraph ⟨ch⟩) appears almost only in proper names in Papiamentu. The letters ⟨j⟩ (except the digraphs ⟨dj⟩ and ⟨zj⟩), ⟨q⟩ and ⟨x⟩ are exclusively used in loan words and names in both dialects.
- ^b ⟨ch⟩, ⟨dj⟩, ⟨sh⟩ and ⟨zj⟩ are the four official digraphs of Papiamento/u.

==== Double consonants and digraphs ====
Consonants are seldom doubled in Papiamento/u. According to the orthographies of both dialects, this only occurs when a word takes on a prefix, e.g. ⟨in⟩- as in innatural ('unnatural'), or a suffix, e.g. -⟨nan⟩ as in pannan ('breads'). In Papiamentu, numerals are written as one word, e.g. dosshen ('two hundred') and are another example of where consonants may appear twice, but in Papiamento they are not, e.g. dos cien/shen. In Papiamento where the letter ⟨c⟩ is often used, the first ⟨c⟩ in words like acceso and occidente is pronounced [k].

The four official digraphs are ⟨ch⟩, ⟨dj⟩, ⟨sh⟩ and ⟨zj⟩, representing [tʃ], [dʒ], [ʃ] and [ʒ] respectively. The combination ⟨sc⟩ appears in Papiamento in loan words such as adolescente, but it is not considered a digraph.

==== Use of C ====
The pronunciation of ⟨c⟩ in both dialects follows the general rule of the hard and soft ⟨c⟩ as in Latin-based orthographies of various European languages, i.e. pronounced [s] before ⟨e⟩ and ⟨i⟩, and [k] elsewhere. However, the use of ⟨c⟩ differs per dialect. As Papiamento is focused more on etymology than phonemic spelling, the ⟨c⟩ is far more commonly used compared to Papiamentu, where its use is limited to proper names.

There is consistency in Papiamento in terms of when a hard ⟨c⟩ is used instead of a ⟨k⟩ and when a soft ⟨c⟩ is used instead of an ⟨s⟩. Before the vowels ⟨a⟩, ⟨o⟩ and ⟨u⟩, a ⟨c⟩ is used instead of a ⟨k⟩, e.g. cas ('house'), cos ('thing') and cushina ('kitchen') instead of kas, kos and kushina. Moreover, a ⟨c⟩ is used instead of a ⟨k⟩ when it appears before an ⟨l⟩, ⟨n⟩, ⟨r⟩ or ⟨t⟩. A soft ⟨c⟩ is used instead of an ⟨s⟩ most often in the final syllable, in verbs ending in ⟨ce⟩ or ⟨ci⟩, e.g. conoce ('to know'), traduci ('to translate'), or words with ⟨ia⟩ or ⟨io⟩ in the final syllable, e.g. social, servicio. This extends to derivatives of such words, such as socialisacion. Less regular examples of the use of a soft ⟨c⟩ instead of an ⟨s⟩ are words like ciego ('blind') and placer ('pleasure').

==== Hard and soft G ====
Many words are of Spanish origin and thus follow Spanish orthography to a certain extent. Like the hard and soft ⟨c⟩, the orthographies of both dialects follow the Spanish example in distinguishing between the hard and soft ⟨g⟩. That is to say, to preserve a voiced ⟨g⟩ ([ɡ]) that would otherwise be a [x] when followed by ⟨i⟩ or ⟨e⟩, it must be written as ⟨gui⟩ and ⟨gue⟩ respectively. The words sigui (from Spanish seguir meaning 'to continue', 'to follow') and guera (from guerra meaning 'war') are pronounced [ˈsiɡi] and [ˈɡera], the ⟨u⟩ being silent as they would be in Spanish. To produce [ɡwi] and [ɡwe] in Spanish, a diaeresis is written above the ⟨u⟩, e.g. vergüenza ('shame'), pingüino ('penguin'). To comply with the rules of Papiamentu orthography, the ⟨u⟩ in such loan words is replaced with a ⟨w⟩, i.e. pingwino.

== Diacritics ==
The Papiamentu dialect of Curaçao and Bonaire is the only one of the two that makes use of the grave accent ⟨`⟩, the diaeresis or trema ⟨¨⟩ and the acute accent ⟨´⟩. The grave accent and diaeresis are used to distinguish one vowel from another, e.g. bon [boŋ] and bòl [bɔl], tur [tur] and hür [hyr], while the acute accent is used to indicate stress within a word. Without an accent, words in Papiamentu take on a consistent manner of emphasis. The stress in words without any acute accent is always on the last syllable in words ending with a consonant and on the penultimate in words ending with a vowel. Words that do not follow the default stress have an acute accent above the vowel (or second vowel of a diphthong) of the stressed syllable.

Like Spanish, Papiamentu orthography distinguishes between four types of words:

- Palabranan skèrpi or oxytones: words with emphasis on the final syllable.
  - Examples: natural, sapaté
- Palabranan grave or paroxytones: words with emphasis on the penultimate (second to last) syllable.
  - Examples: mésun, buki
- Palabranan esdrúhulo or proparoxytones: from the Spanish word esdrújula, words with emphasis on the antepenultimate (third to last) syllable.
  - Examples: mónseñor, penúltimo
- Palabranan sobresdrúhulo: from the Spanish word sobreesdrújula, words with emphasis on the preantepenultimate (fourth to last) syllable.
  - Examples: álablanka, mónstruoso

Stress is always placed on a syllable with a grave accent, e.g. tèmpo, unless there is another syllable with an acute accent, e.g. kòrtá. As such, vowels with grave accents are not altered to indicate stress on the syllable in which it is located.

=== Apocope ===
In many cases in Papiamentu, the acute accent preserves emphasis in words of Spanish and/or Portuguese origin where they would otherwise have naturally occurred, i.e. without an acute accent. In these cases, words have undergone a seemingly systematic elision of final letters, or apocope. In verbs, the final -r in infinitive form and -do of past participles had been dropped, among other examples. Words like reconocer ('to recognise') became rekonosé and marcado ('marked') became marká. As for the ending of words describing a person of a certain profession or craft, words like zapatero ('cobbler') and pescador ('fisherman') became sapaté and piskadó. This phonological change brought with it the orthographical problem in distinguishing between certain words like kushina, from cocina ('kitchen') and kushiná, from cocinar ('to cook'). This is resolved by the use of the acute accent.

== Contractions ==
In both dialects, phonological elision often takes place in colloquial speech and writing and orthographic rules take these contractions into account. The orthographic rules of Papiamentu in particular discourage the use of contractions, recommending that words be spelt out in full as much as possible. The most common contractions involve the words ta ('to be'), pa ('to, for'), di ('of'), no ('no, not') and e ('him/her/it, the').

- ta > t’
  - Ta is only contracted when followed by a word beginning with a vowel, e.g. e ta aki > e t’aki ('he/she/it is here').
  - T’ is always affixed to the word following it.
- pa > p’
  - Pa is contracted in the same way as ta, e.g. ta pa esei/esey mi ta bai > ta p'esei/p'esey mi ta bai ('that's why I am going')
- di > ’i
  - Di may be contracted whether preceded by a vowel or consonant, e.g. saku/saco di lamunchi > sak’i/sac’i lamunchi ('sack of limes'), kas/cas di Juan > ka’i/ca’i Juan ('John's house').
  - ’i is only affixed to the word preceding it if a phoneme is dropped from the preceding word as well, e.g. peña di Sandra > peñ’i Sandra ('Sandra's comb'), but brel di solo > brel ’i solo ('sunglasses').
  - In some cases, words ending in an unstressed -er like boter/bòter ('bottle') may be contracted without the use of an apostrophe, e.g. boter/bòter di awa > botr’i/bòtr’i awa ('bottle of water') and not bot’r’i/bòt’r’i awa.
- no > n’
  - No is only contracted when followed by a word with a consonant, e.g. nan no sa > nan n’ sa (they don't know).
  - N’ is never affixed to other words.
- e > ’e/’é
  - E is only contracted when preceded by a word with a vowel, e.g. Anna lo manda e > Anna lo mand’e/mand’é (Anna will send it).
  - Like ’i, ’e/’é is only affixed to the word preceding it if a phoneme is dropped from the preceding word as well.
  - Because e is stressed and changes the stress of the word to which it is affixed, it is always accented in Papiamentu when contracted, e.g. nos a traha e > nos a trah’é ('we made it').

Note: the pronunciation of Papiamento words with a ⟨c⟩ does not change when such words are contracted with di or e, i.e. the ⟨c⟩ in sac’i lamunchi, though followed by an ⟨i⟩, retains its /k/ sound.

=== Erroneous use ===
The contraction of no is peculiar in that, while its vowel is dropped, it is never affixed to the following word like ta and pa are, or to any word for that matter. Moreover, no is only contracted when followed by a consonant, not a vowel as in the aforementioned examples. The exceptional nature of this contraction might lead to confusion and erroneous affixture or ’n instead of n’. The latter may be attributed to the fact that the ⟨n⟩ in n’ becomes nasal before verbs beginning with ⟨g⟩ or ⟨k⟩ (or a hard ⟨c⟩), e.g. mi n’ kere /miŋ kere/ ('I didn't believe'). The /ŋ/ sound is typically associated with ⟨n⟩ in a final location and mi’n kere may seem to make more sense.

As mentioned, e, like di, is only contracted with the word preceding it if a phoneme is dropped from the preceding word as well. E, however, has the unique property of changing the emphasis of the word before it. Both ’e and ’i are commonly affixed to the word before them, even when they shouldn't be. In Papiamentu, ’é should always take on the acute accent because it is stressed when contracted.
