= Massachusett writing systems =

Systems for writing the Native American language Massachusett

Massachusett writing systems describes the historic and modern systems used for writing Massachusett, an indigenous Algonquian language of the Algic language family. At the time Europeans colonized the region, Massachusett was the primary language of several peoples of New England, including the Massachusett in the area roughly corresponding to Boston, Massachusetts, including much of the Metrowest and South Shore areas just to the west and south of the city; the Wampanoag, who still inhabit Cape Cod and the Islands, most of Plymouth and Bristol counties and south-eastern Rhode Island, including some of the small islands in Narragansett Bay; the Nauset, who may have rather been an isolated Wampanoag sub-group, inhabited the extreme ends of Cape Cod; the Coweset of northern Rhode Island; and the Pawtucket which covered most of northeastern Massachusetts and the lower tributaries of the Merrimack River and coast of New Hampshire, and the extreme southernmost point of Maine. Massachusett was also used as a common second language of peoples throughout New England and Long Island, particularly in a simplified pidgin form.

The missionary John Eliot learned the language from bilingual translators and interpreters. In writing down the language, he used the Latin alphabet and English-style orthographical conventions. By the 1650s, Eliot had begun translating portions of the Bible, some published, that were distributed to the Indians, and the Indians that learned to read became active agents in the spread of literacy. Eliot used the dialect of the Massachusett, specifically the speech of Natick, in his Bible translation—the first Bible in any language printed in the Americas—and other printed works; dialect leveling ensued. Several other missionaries fluent in the language also offered their own missionary tracts and translations. By the 1670s, only twenty years after Eliot's first translations, one in three Indians were literate. The language faded as Indians faced increasing dispossession and assimilation pressures, with the last speakers dying off at the tail end of the nineteenth century.

In 1993, Jessie Little Doe Baird (née Fermino), co-founded the Wôpanâak Language Reclamation Project in an effort to bring the language back to her people. She studied at the Massachusetts Institute of Technology with linguists Kenneth Hale and later Norvin Richards. In her master's thesis, completed in 2000, Baird introduced a modernized orthography based on the colonial system but with a one-to-one correlation between sound and spelling. In 2021, voters in the city of Cambridge, Massachusetts, approved installing bilingual English–Massachusetts street signs on First through Eighth Street (Nekône to Neeshwôsuktashe Taꝏmâôk, in Massachusetts) in East Cambridge. Installation of the signs will begin in 2024.

== Pre-writing ==
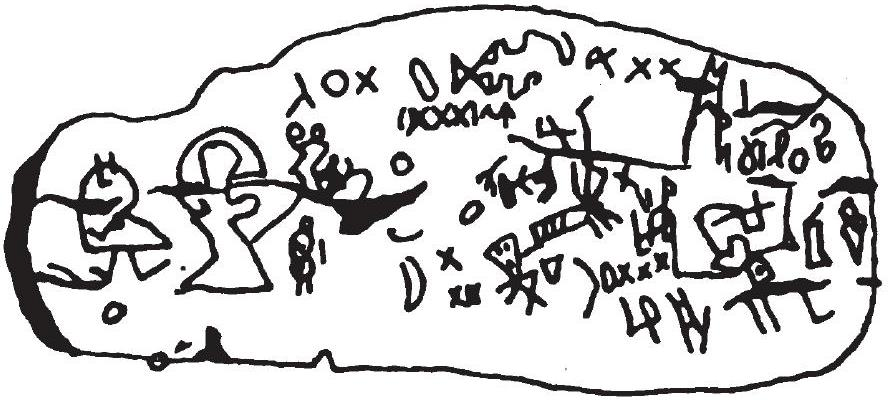
Drawing of the engravings on Dighton Rock in the Taunton River, the best known site in Massachusetts. Examples of similar depictions carved into rocks have been found across New England, such as Bellows Falls, Vermont.

Prior to the introduction of literacy by the missionary Eliot, the Massachusett-speaking peoples were mainly an orally transmitted culture, with social taboos, mores, customs, legends, history, knowledge and traditions passed from the elders to the next generation through song, stories and discussion. With peoples from further away, speakers switched to a pidgin variety of Massachusett used across New England, but when spoken language failed, sign language was used. Little is known about the Eastern Woodlands Algonquian sign language other than its usage. Lenape were often recruited in the wars with the Indians of the west because of their ability to effectively communicate in silence. Even American Sign Language was likely influenced by the sign language of the Wampanoag of Martha's Vineyard, who interacted with a large population of English colonists who were deaf and signed. Martha's Vineyard Sign Language went extinct at the beginning of the twentieth century, but many of its users were influential in the development of ASL. Little is known of it other than its existence, but it was likely similar in scope and usage such as extant Plains Indian Sign Language.

Ojibwe wiigwaasabak. Similar dendroglyphs likely were used by the Indians of New England.

The most important form of symbolic communication that the Indians employed were dendroglyphs. These symbols carved into trees and logs served as boundary markers between tribes, to thank local spirits in the wake of a successful hunt and to record one's whereabouts. Moravian missionaries in the mid-eighteenth century noted that the Lenape of Pennsylvania and New Jersey would carve animals and etchings onto trees when they camped, and were able to pinpoint the tribe, region or village of symbols that they encountered. Similarly, the Abenaki peoples of northern New England used etchings on trees to mark paths or drew beaver huts and ponds to mark their trapping areas. The Mi'kmaq pictographic tradition was later converted into a true writing system with adjustments by French missionaries. These symbols were also painted. In 1813, residents found a tree carved into the shape of a woman and a child around Lake Winnipesaukee. Evidence for dendroglyphic picture writing in southern New England is lacking, as most of the trees were felled by the Federal Period, with current forests consisting of secondary growth after farms were abandoned for land in the Great Plains in the end of the nineteenth century. The markings may have been similar to the wiigwaasabak of Anishinaabe (Ojibwe) culture in scope and usage, able to record mnemonically songs related to ritual traditions, meetings between clans, maps and tribal identity.

Pictographs carved into the rocks date back to the middle Archaic Period, ca. 6000-4000 BC up until a century after colonization. Most notorious are the etchings on Dighton Rock in the Taunton River but also several sites around Assawompset Pond. The figures depicted on Dighton Rock are similar to those of Bellows Falls, Vermont and other sites across New England. Most depictions include carved hands, the sun, the moon in various phases, people or spirits, anthropomorphic beings, various native animals, markings similar to the letters 'E,' 'M,' 'X,' and 'I,' slashes and crosses, circles that may represent planetary figures, trees, river courses and figures from shamanic tradition like giants, thunderbirds and horned serpents. During and after colonization, some depict Europeans and ships. Many are carved near water, and probably because these were sacred sites, commemorated historic agreements or to mark the land.

Early adopters of literacy are known to have signed their names with animal symbols related to their tribe, clan or stature. For a century after English arrival, the Indians continued to mark rocks and trees, and one site in Massachusetts features a large boulder, with depictions of wetus from as far back as 3000 years old, to depictions of ships shortly after the period of English settlement began, and a few drawings and the Latin letters of the owner's name, where a Wampanoag family was present until the early twentieth century.

== Alphabet ==
Colonial			Modern			Example		
Letter	Values	Name	Letter	Values	Name	Colonial	Modern	English
A a	/a/, /aː/, /ã/, /ə/	a	A a	/a/	(a)	appin	(apun) /apən/, 'bed'	'bed'
			Â â^{1}^{,}^{5}	/aː/	(â)	ókéomꝏs ágqushau- pasuk	(âhkeeôm8s) /aːhk ˈiː ˌãm ˌuːs/ (âquhshô-) /aːkʷəhʃã-/ (pâsuq) /paːsək/	'bee' 'to go underneath something' 'one' (of something)
B b^{2}	/b/^{4}, /p/	bee				Bible -baug	(Bible) (-pâq) /paːk/	'Bible' 'pond'
C c^{2}	/k/, /s/, /ʃ/	ſee (see)				consteppe mockis	(constable) (mahkus) /mahkəs/	'constable' 'shoe'
Ch ch	/tʃ/, /tʲ/, /tjᵊ/	chee	Ch ch	/tʃ/	cha	chippanꝏonk	(chapunuwôk) /tʃapənəwãk/	'division'
D d^{2}	/d/^{4}, /t/	dee				Deuteronomy^{3} adtôau	(Deuteronomy) (atôwâw) /atãwaːw/	'Deuteronomy' 'he/she intends' (to buy)
E e	/iː/, /ə/, /∅/, /jᵊ/	e	E e	/ʲᵊ/	(e)	wepitteash wuttuckenes	(weeputeash) /wiːpətjᵊaʃ/ (wuhtuhq) /wəhtəhk/ (nees) /niːs/	'his teeth' 'wood'
			Ee ee^{1}	/iː/	(ee)	nees menan	(nees) /niːs/ (meenan) /miːnan/	'two' (someone's) 'tongue'
F f^{3}	/f/^{4}, /p/	ef				figſe (figse)	('figs')	'fig'
G g^{2}	/g/^{4}, /k/, /dʒ/^{4}, /ʒ/^{4}	gee				Galilee^{3} George ahtuquog	(Galilee) (George) ahtuqak /ahtəkʷak/	'Galilee' 'George' 'deer' (pl)
H h	/h/, /∅/	*aitch (?)^{6}	H h	/h/	(ha)	howan mohpeeak	(hâwan) /hawan/ (mapeeak) /mapiːak/	'who?' (someone's) 'hips'
I i	/ə/, /iː/, /aːj/, /aj/	i				'Indiansog wompi	(Indiansak) (wôpây) /wãpaːj/	'Indians' (Native Americans) 'it is white' (color)
J j^{2}^{,}^{7}	/dʒ/^{4}, /ʒ/^{4}, /tʃ/, /tʲ/, /tjᵊ/	ji				Jehovah manitt nawaj sonjum	(Jehovah manut) (nawach) /nawatʃ/ (sôtyum) /sătʲəm/	'God Jehovah' 'I keep' 'chief', 'leader'
K k	/k/	ka	K k	/k/	(ka)	ken	(keen), /kiːn/	'you' (singular)
L l^{3}	/l/^{4}, /n/	el				leviathan^{3}	(Leviathan)	'Leviathan'
M m	/m/, /~∅[/p/]/	em	M m	/m/	(ma)	mꝏse wompoose	(m8s), /muːs/, 'moose' (wôp8s) /wãpuːs/	'moose' 'wompoose' (extinct Eastern elk)
N n	/n/, /~∅/	en	N n	/n/	(na)	nen usquond	(neen), /niːn/ (usqôt) /əskʷãt/	'I' or 'me' 'door'
O o	/a/, /aː/, /ã/, /ə/	o				ohke netop weetauom-	(ahkee) /ahkiː/ (neetôp) /niːtãp/ (weetawâm-) /wiːtawaːm/	'my friend' 'earth' 'to marry'
			Ô ô^{1}	/ã/	(ô)	mꝏôi wasketomp	(m8ôây) /muːãaːj/ (waskeetôp) /waskiːtãp/	'it is deep' 'man'
Ꝏ ꝏ^{8}	/uː/, /wə/, /əw/, /ə/	*ꝏ (?)^{6}	8 8^{1}	/uː/	(8)	askꝏk hettꝏonk 'ꝏweemattog'	(ask8k) /askuːk/ (hutuwôk) /hətəwãk/ (weematak) /wiːmatak/	'snake' 'speech' 'his/her brothers'
P p	/p/	pee	P p	/p/	(pa)	pummee	(pumee) /pəmiː/	'fat' or 'grease'
Q q	/kʷ/, /k/^{9}	kéuh	Q q	/kʷ/, /k/^{9}	(qa)	quaqueu mosq mettugqosh	(qaqeew) /kʷakʷiːw/ (masq) (mehtuqash) /məhtəkʷaʃ/	'she/he runs' 'bear' 'trees'
R r^{3}	/r/^{4}, /n/	ar				rabbi^{3}	(rabbi)	'rabbi'
S s ſ	/s/, /ʃ/	eſ (es)	S s	/s/	(sa)	sépu Maſſachuſett	(seepuw) /siːpəw (Muhsachuw[ee]sut)	'river' 'Massachusett'
			Sh sh^{1}	/ʃ/	sha	kꝏſh	(k8sh) /kuːʃ/	'your father'
T t	/t/	tee	T t	/t/	(ta)	taquonck	(taqôk) /taqãk/	'autumn'
			Ty ty^{1}	/tʲ/	(tya)	keteau wetu	(keetyâw) /kiːtʲaːw/ (weetyuw) /wiːtʲəw/	'he/she recovers' 'wigwam'
U u	/uː/, /a/, /ə/	u	U u	/ə/	(u)	ummissies wetu	(umuhsees) /əməhsiːs/, 'his/her sister' (weetyuw)	'her/his sister' 'home'
V v^{3}^{,}^{7}	/v/^{4}, /p/	vf (uf), úph				silver	(silver)	'silver'
W w	/w/	wee	W w	/w/	(wa)	weyaus mauag	(weeyâws) /wiːjaːws/ (mawak) /mawak/	'meat' 'they cry'
X x^{2}	/ks/, /z/^{4}	eks				oxenog nux	(oxenak) (nukees) /nəkiːs/	'oxen' 'yes'
Y y	/j/, /aj/, /aːj/, /iː/	wy	Y y	/j/	(ya)	yau wopy	(yâw) /jaːw/, 'four' (wôpây) /wãpaːj/	'four' 'it is white'
Z z^{2}	/z/^{4}, /s/	zad				Zion kez[i]heau	(Zion) (keesuheâw) /kiːsəhjᵊaːw/	'Zion' 'she/he creates'
Y (Þ) y (þ)^{3}^{,}^{8}	/θ~ð/^{4}, /t/	*thorn (?)^{6}				Y^{urſday} mon^{y}	(Thursday) (month)	'Thursday' 'month'

- ^1 Exists as a separate letter in the modern alphabet.
- ^2 Used in both native and English loan words in the colonial system. Not used in the modern spelling save proper names and places.
- ^3 Only exists in loan words in the colonial spelling.
- ^4 Pronunciation only found in loan words in English, and likely, only found among speakers proficiently bilingual in English, otherwise was substituted with closest native equivalent.
- ^5 Vowels with a circumflex ( ˆ ) in the colonial spelling generally indicated the nasal vowel /ã/ or that the vowel was stressed or long, which could also be indicated by the acute accent ( ´ ). Although Â and Ô were not considered separate letters in the colonial alphabet, they are in the modern alphabet.
- ^6 Eliot never listed a name for these symbols.
- ^7 The colonial alphabet differentiated J and V from I and U even though this was not the case in the English alphabet at the time. These letters are now considered distinct in most languages that use the Latin alphabet, but are not in use in the modern script as they represent sounds not found in the language.
- ^8 The double ligature Ꝏ was not considered a letter, but its modern variant 8 is in the modern alphabet. The letter thorn, although used as a letter in Eliot's period, was replaced by the digraph Th and was not listed as part of the Massachusett alphabet and stopped being included in the English alphabet.
- ^9 Q in final positions is pronounced as /k/ in both spelling systems.

== Orthography ==
=== Colonial system ===
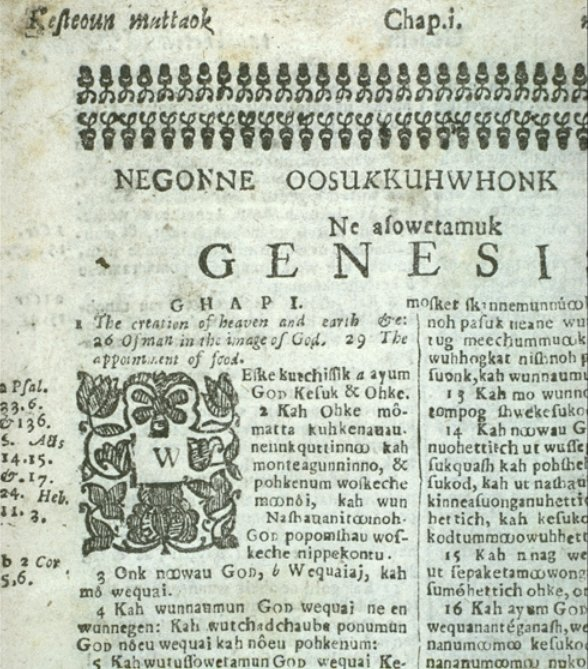
Top right corner of the first page of Genesis from the 1663 printing of Eliot's translation of the Bible. One can see the diacritics and long s that were in use.

As Eliot listened to the Indians from the Praying Town of Natick, he wrote down words according to English orthography, which later developed into the colonial system in use from the 1650s until the mid-nineteenth century. Eliot used the entire Latin alphabet as used in English at the time to write the language.

==== Accent marks ====
Vowels could be marked with the acute accent ( ´ ) or the circumflex ( ˆ ) over the vowel. As a general rule, the acute accent served to mark stress or to lengthen a vowel, and the circumflex was used to mark nasal vowels. However, colonial ô was consistently used for /ã/, whereas â was used to mark nasal vowels as well as the long vowel /aː/. Both the Indians and the English missionaries used these accent marks sparingly, but when they were employed, usage was inconsistent and sometimes interchangeable.

The possible vowels with diacritics include acute accent Á, É, Í, Ó and Ú as well as circumflex accent Â, Ê, Î, Ô and Û. Only Â and Ô are in common use, the other vowels with circumflexes are only rarely attested and generally used where, prescriptively, an acute accent would be used. They do serve as disambiguation, for example, e could represent /ə/ such as in hettuog (hutuwôk) /hətəwãk/, 'speech,' /iː/ in ken (keen) /kiːn/, 'you' or the /j/ in wepitteash, but é always represents /iː/, as in wunnékin (wuneekun) /wəniːkən/, 'it is good.' At other times, the marks are confusing, as in the case of what would be (awasuw) /awasəw/ in the modern orthography, 'he warms himself,' which was written as auwossu, ouwassu, âwosu (suggesting /ãwasəw/) and auwósu (suggesting /awaːsəw/) in the colonial script.

==== Retention of archaic Early Modern English features ====
As Massachusett was first committed to writing just around 1650, based on an adaptation of the Latin alphabet and English orthography, it adopted aspects of Early Modern English conventions that disappeared in England by the late seventeenth century, but probably lingered a few generations later in the American colonies due to isolation. Since John Eliot wrote at this time, it was natural that orthographical conventions in use were transferred into Massachusett. It shares the following features:

- S has a variant minuscule form, the long s 'ſ' used as s but word initially or medially. It is easily confused with f, which in print and handwriting of the time often was written akin to the florin 'ƒ'. Although not generally reproduced when discussing the language, either in this article or scholarly literature, most printed and handwritten texts of the English and the Indians would have featured ſ in place of s word-initially or word-medially in the seventeenth century.
  Early Modern English 'aſſure' and 'ƒiſsure' but 'is' vs. Modern 'assure,' 'fissure and 'is.'
  Colonial Massachusett woſketop, Maſſachuſett but weyaus vs. Modern (waskeetôp), (Muhsachuwusut) and (weeyâws).
- E is often a silent letter at the end of words, and consonants are doubled before it, or final k is written ck.
  Early Modern English 'ſhoppe' and 'logicke' and Modern English 'shop' and 'logic.'
  Colonial wompatucke and wampumpeague and Modern (wôpuhtuq) /wãpəhtək/, 'snow goose,' and (wôpôpeeak) /wãpãpiːak/, 'stringed wampum.'
- J is still considered a consonantal variant of I, and I replaces J especially in formal texts word initially. The end of Early Modern English finally led to its separation as a distinct letter. In the colonial alphabet, J is used to represent /tʃ/, /tjᵊ/ and /tʲ/ in native words.
  Early Modern English 'Julius' or 'Iulius' and 'juſt' or 'iuſt' and Modern 'Julius' and 'just.'
  Colonial Massachusett waju and nawaj and Modern (wach8), 'mountain,' and (nuwach) /nəwatʃ/, 'chief.'
- O represented the short vowel /ʊ/ in Early Modern English, but this has mostly been replaced by U, e.g., 'sommer' and modern 'summer,' but common words such as 'some,' 'one,' 'come' and 'love' retain the spelling of Middle English. In the colonial orthography for Massachusett, o is usually interchangeable as a symbol for a, thus could represent /a/, /aː/ and /ã/ and even /ə/.
  Early Modern English 'ſommer' vs. 'plommes' vs. Modern 'summer' and 'plums' (but still 'one' and 'some' not *'wun' and *'sum')
  Colonial Massachusett maſquog and ohtomp vs. Modern (masqak) /maskʷak/, 'bears,' and (ahtôp) /ahtãp/, 'bowstring.'
- U is not yet distinguished from V. As a general rule, v is used initially and U elsewhere, although in formal texts and book titles, V was more common. Although by Eliot's time, the use of v as a consonant and u as a vowel was beginning to develop as a general rule, it was still in that transition. When applied to Massachusett, U was a vowel and V, its consonantal variant, was used for loan words from English, such as ſilver and Jehovah, however, were not distinguished as separate letters.
- Y, originally descended from Anglo-Saxon runic Þ, was used to write /θ/ and /ð/. Although the Normans replaced it with th, the practice of using Y came from the similarity in certain black letter fonts to Y (/j/) in use during Middle English. By Early Modern English, the use of Y to represent the old letter Þ 'thorn,' was fading in print, but remained in handwriting and occasionally in print as a shorthand for th, often with either the letter or the letters after in superscript to distinguish it from Y (/j/). Although it was not part of the Massachusett alphabet, it was likely used to spell some loan words from English especially in the early colonial period.
  Early Modern English 'y^{is} and y^{at}' and 'whi^{y}er ^{y}i^{y}er' vs. Modern 'this and that' and 'whither thither.'
  Colonial Massachusett mon^{y} and Y^{urſday} (loans from English).

=== Modern system ===
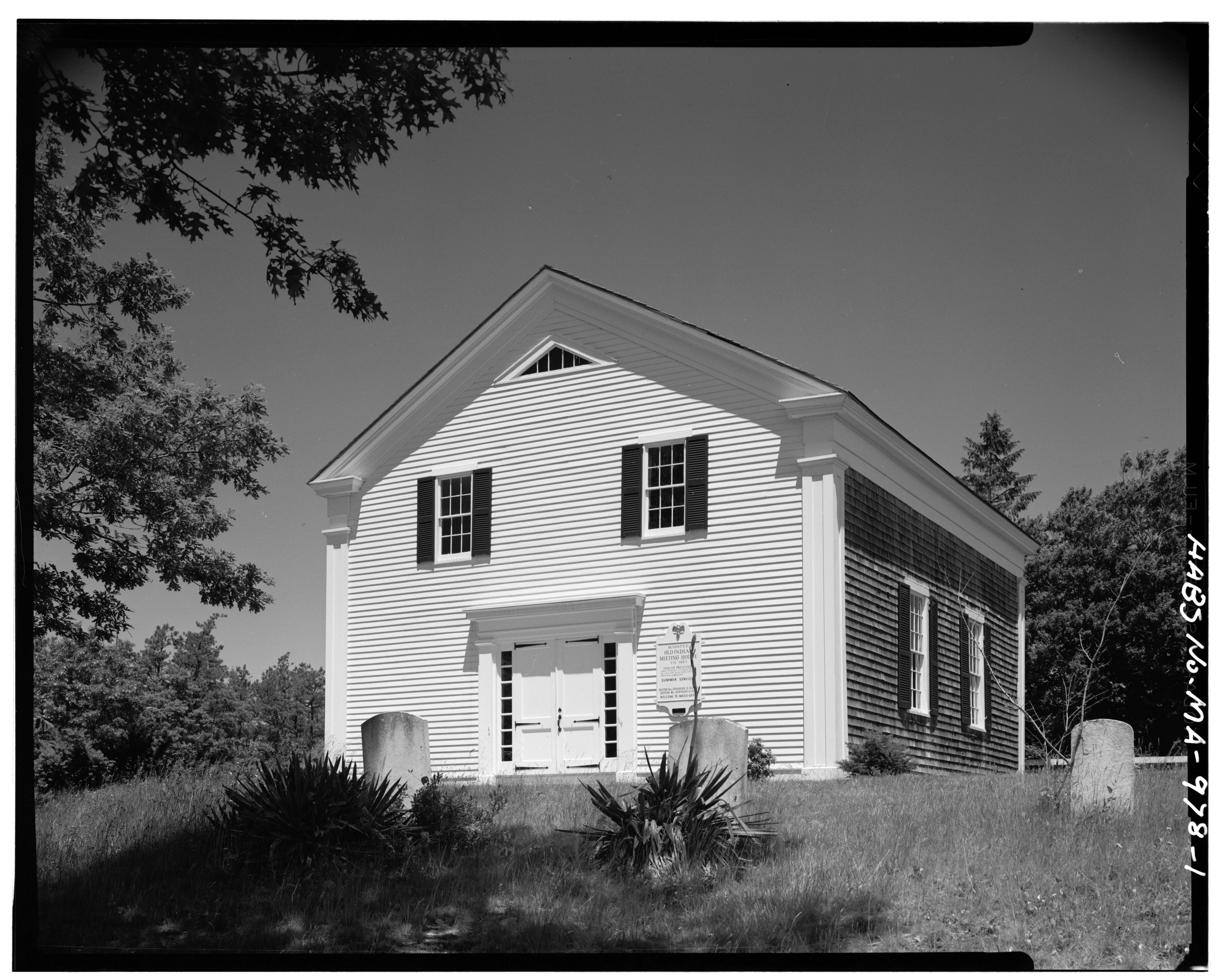
The Old Indian Church and Meetinghouse of the Mashpee Wampanoag tribe. The first literate Indian parishioners used the old colonial orthography, but today, the Mashpee and three other Wampanoag tribes use the modern system developed by the WLRP at the turn of the twenty-first century.

The modern, phonetic system in use by the (Wôpanâak) Language Reclamation Project was first introduced by Baird in her master's thesis, An Introduction to Wampanoag Grammar, which she completed 2000 at MIT. Baird adjusted the writing system to better fit the phonology of the language. She found vocabulary and Massachusett radicals from the large corpus of missionary translations and personal letters and records of literate Indians that survives today—it is, in fact, the largest corpus of Native American written documents in North America. Pronunciation was pieced together with clues in the early writing, as well as through comparative linguistics work studying sound changes and other patterns of development from Proto-Algonquian and its various descendants.

==== Alphabetic differences ====
The most striking feature of the new orthography is substitution of (8) for the double-o ligature ꝏ of the colonial period. This was done to ease inputting, rendering and printing and possibly because of its resemblance to the ou-ligature ȣ used in Algonquin and Abenaki Latin-script orthographies, although the Abenaki have also replaced ȣ with 8 for similar reasons. For example, historical mꝏs (Massachusett) and mȣs (Abenaki) and WLRP (m8s). Inspired by the colonial script, the modern orthography uses (â) and (ô) which resemble A and O with circumflexes, but modern usage restricts the former to represent /aː/ and the latter /ã/ whereas any vowel with a circumflex usually indicated nasality in the colonial script. These are considered letters in their own respective right, and not vowels with diacritics, in the modern orthographical system.

As the WLRP favors resurrecting old vocabulary, neologisms based on Massachusett radicals or use of forms from other extant languages over the use of English loan words, the new alphabet noticeably lacks the letters F, L, V and R, used only in loan words, as well as B, C, D, G, J, and Z that were previously used in both loans and native words as alternates to their respective voiced or unvoiced counterparts. Although excluded from the alphabet, these letters are used to write proper names and some loans from English as all speakers and language learners and speakers today are native English speakers in a predominately English-speaking nation. X, which mainly appears in rare syncopated versions of native words and English loan words, now only appears in loan words, but was originally used in dialects that allowed for syncopation.

==== Exceptions to phonemic spelling ====
The Modern orthography lacks the confusing array of multiple, often contradictory, spellings, essentially representing a one-to-one correspondence between sound and spelling. It lacks gemination (letter doubling), silent E's, letter thorn, excessive English loan words and frustratingly variant spellings of the previous system.

A few exceptions to the general rule exist. (Q) as /kʷ/ before vowels and /k/ elsewhere, where (K) would be expected. The reason for this is because it prevents alternations between (Q) and (K) when medial and final radicals are appended, it would remain (Q) before certain ones and (K) elsewhere. For example, in Colonial spelling, the word for 'bear' was moſk or moſhk (but also moſhq and moſq), but when any endings, such as the plural or obviative endings are attached, Q was always used, often accompanied by U, e.g., masquog or mosquohwhereas the modern orthography avoids this alteration by using (Q) in all cases, with a simple rule to gleam its proper pronunciation, hence modern (masq) /mask/, 'bear,' (masqash), 'bears' and (masqah) 'bear' (obviative).

(TE) and the letter (TY) produce essentially the same alveo-palatal /tʲ/ sound, although there is a slight difference in their respective origins which is distinguished in the orthography. The letter (TY) represents palatization of /k/, which occurs when /k/ is followed by /ə/, if that /ə/ is etymologically a weakened form of PEA *ī, which is in turn followed by either /hp/, /p/, /m/, /hk/ or /k/. Palatization is also triggered when /k/ is followed by /aː/, which derives from PEA *ē, and /əw/, which remains unchanged from PEA *əw. For example, (weekuw), 'it is his/her house,' vs. (weety8), 'house,' both derive from Proto-Algonquian *wi·kiw[a·ʔmi] and (sôtyum) from Proto-Algonquian *sa·kima·wa.

(TE) is actually (T) followed by (E), the latter is used to represent vowel affection. In Massachusett, this involves /j/-insertion before vowels that follow /iː/ or /ə/ but after /n/, /h/, /t/ or /ht/. For example, (weeputeash) /wiːpətjᵊaʃ/, 'his teeth.' In both cases, the /ə/ descends etymologically from Proto-Eastern Algonquian /iː/. Although similar, infection often occurs as a replacement for a vowel that was once present. For instance, Massachusett (weeputeash) descends from Proto-Algonquian *wi·pitiari. (E) is used similarly to the Colonial orthography, where E was used in analogous positions. Although (E) is taken as /j/, most current speakers, and likely historical speakers, pronounce it as /jᵊ/ which is represented here.

The colonial orthography used the ligature letter ꝏ generally represented /uː/ but was also used in place of /wə/ and /əw/, whereas these sounds are represented in the modern orthography as (8), (wu) and (uw), respectively. In rapid speech, /uː/ and /əw/ can be confused, for example, Colonial hettꝏonk vs. Modern (hutuwôk) /hətəwãk/, 'speech.'

=== Consonants and clusters ===
Comparison of consonants and consonantal clusters in both orthographies
Sound	Colonial	Modern	Colonial example	Modern example
/tʃ/	ch, dt, dj, j	(ch)	cheek[e]hikunk	(cheekuheekôk) /tʃiːkəhiːkãk/, 'broom'
/h/	h, hh	(h)	howan	(hawân) /hawaːn/, 'who?'
/htʃ/	hch, ch, tch	(hch)	mohchiyeu	(mahchây8-) /mahtʃaːyuː/, 'to be room enough' or 'to be empty'
/hk/	hk, k, kk	(hk)	ohke	(ahkee) /ahkiː/, 'earth' or 'land'
/hm/	m, mm, hm	(hm)	mꝏmꝏsquehe-	(m8hm8hshquhe-) /muːhmuːhʃkʷəhə-/, 'to cause to become angry,' 'to provoke' or 'to cause to complain'
/hn/	n, hn, nn	(hn)	nehnikikôsu	(neehneekuhkôsu) /niːhniːkəhãsə-/, 'to be torn'
/hp/	p, pp, hp	(hp)	appapit	(ahpaput), /ahpapət/, 'place upon which he/she sits'
/hpw/	hpw, hp, pp, p	(hpw)	supp[attau]	(suhpwahtâ-) /səhpwahtaː-/, (of the eyes) 'to be shut'
/hkʷ/	qu, hq, hqu, hgu, gu	(hq)	ahquon	(uhqôn) /əhkʷãn/, 'hook'
/hs/	ss, s, hs	(hs)	hassan	(ahsun) /ahsən/, 'stone'
/hsw/	hsw, sw, hs, hsu	(hsw)	chikkóswu-	(chakahswu-) /tʃakahswə-/, 'to be burned' (by fire)
/hʃ/	sh, hsh, hs	(hsh)	nush-	(nuhsh-) /nəhʃ-/, 'to kill'
/hʃw/	hshw, hsh, hshu, hsu	(hshw)	quoshwi-	(qahshwee-) /kʷahʃwiː-/, 'to be ready'
/ht/	ht, t, tt	(ht)	mehtauog	(muhtawaq) /məhtawak/, 'ear'
/htjᵊ/	the, hti, tt	(the)	kꝏchteau-	(k8theaw-)
/htʲ/	the, hti, tt	(hty)	kogkahtim-)	(kakâhtyum-) /kakaːhtʲəm/, 'to advise'
/htw/	ht, htw, tt, t	(htw)	nattin-	(nahtwun-) /nahtwən/, 'to take'
/hw/	hw, hu, hꝏ	(hw)	sahwuchuan	(sahwuchuwan) /sahwətʃəwan/, 'to flow out' or 'to discharge'
/k/	c, k, g, q, ck, kk', cg, kg	(k)	kꝏsh	(k8sh) /kuːʃ/, 'your (sg.) father'
/m/	m, mm	(m)	matta	(mata) /mata/, 'no' or 'not'
/mw/	mw, mu, mꝏ	(mw)	annimuog	(anumwak) /anəmwak/, 'dogs'
/n/	n, nn	(n)	nén	(neen) /niːn/, 'I' or 'me'
/nw/	nw, nu	(nw)	nanweetu	(nanweetyuw) /nanwiːtʲɘw/, 'she/he is common born,' 'he/she is a commoner'
/p/	p, b, bb, bp, pb, pp	(p)	pasuk	(pâsuq) /paːsək/, 'one' (unitary thing, not the number)
/pw/	pw, po, pu	(pw)	chupwuttoonapwaog	(chupwut8nâpuwôk), /tʃəpwətuːnaːpəwãk/, 'kiss'
/kʷ/	q, qu, gu	(q)	quinni	(qunây) /kʷənaːj/, 'it is long'
/s/	s, z, ss, zz, sz	(s)	sepꝏ	(seepuw) /siːpuː/
/sk/	sk, shk, sc, sg	(sk)	askꝏk	(ask8k) /askuːk/, 'snake'
/skʷ/	squ, sq, sgu, shqu, shq	(sq)	sonkisq[ua]	(sôkusqâ) /sãkəskʷaː/, 'female chief,' 'queen' or 'wife of the chief'
/sw/	sw, su, s	(sw)	mꝏsusu-	(m8swôsu-) /muːswãsə-/, 'to be shaven'
/ʃ/	sh, s	(sh)	mehtugquosh	(muhtuqash) /məhtəkʷaʃ/, 'trees'
/ʃk/	sk, shk	(shk)	wuski, wushke	(wushkee) /wəʃkiː/, 'new'
/ʃp/	sp, shp	(shp)	nashpe	(nashpee) /naʃpiː/, 'with'
/ʃkʷ/	squ, sq, shq, shqu	(shq)	quoshquussausu-	(qashqusôsu-) /kʷaʃkʷəsãsə-/, 'to be circumcised'
/ʃw/	shw, sw	(sw)	nanashwe-	(nanashwe-) /nanaʃwə/, 'to be prepared'
/t/	t, tt, dt, d, dd	(t)	tamogkon	(tamakun) /tamakən/, 'flood'
/tjᵊ/	t[e], t[y], t[i]	(te)	wepitteash	(weeputeash) /wiːpətjᵊaʃ/, 'his/her teeth'
/tw/	tw, tu	(tw)	natwantam	(natwântam) /natwaːntam/, 'to consider something'
/tʲ/	te, ti, t[u], ty, ch, dj, j, jt, ge	(ty)	sachem	(sôtyum) /sãtʲəm/, 'chief'
/w/	w	(w)	wasketop	(waskeetôp) /waskiːtãp/, 'man'
/j/	y, i	(y)	yáw	(yâw) /jaːw/, 'four'

=== Vowels and vowel-semivowel combinations ===
Comparison of vowel and vowel-semivowel combinations
Sound	Colonial	Modern	Colonial example	Modern example
/a/	a, au, o, u	(a)	ohtomp	(ahtôp) /ahtãp/, 'bowstring'
/aw/	au, aw	(aw)	kenau	(keenaw /kinaw/, 'you' (pl.)
/awa/	awa, aua, oa, owa, awo	(awa)	wadtauatonkqussuwonk	(watawahtôqusuwôk) /watawahtãkʷəsəwãk/, 'voice' or 'sound'
/awã/	awô, auwo, awá	(awô)	nadtauwompu	(natawôpu-) /natawãpə-/, 'to look for'
/aja/	aya, aia, ia	(aya)	piaquttum	(payaquhtam /pajakʷəhtam/, 'to have authority over'
/ajuː/	ayeu, aiꝏ	(ay8)	nayeum	(nay8m) /naju/, 'to be ridden'
/ajã/	iu, iô, aiâ	(ayô)	piusuhke	(payôsuhkee-) /pajãsəhkiː-/, 'to be up against,' 'to be adjoining'
/ajə/	ayu, ayeu, ayꝏ	(ayu)	ayeuwuttúonk	(ayuwuhtyuwôk) /ajəwəhtʲəwãk/, 'fighting'
/aː/	a, ai, á, â, o, ó, ah, oa	(â)	nuppaih	(nupâh) /nəpaːh/, 'I wait' (for him/her)
/aːa/	aa, oa, áa	(âa)	Wampanoag	(Wôpanâak) /wãpanaːak/, 'Wampanoag' (people)
/aːaː/	aa, oá, aá	(ââ)	waáp-	(wââp-) /waːaːp-/, 'up'
/aːiː/	ae, aé, aee	(âee)	ompuhmaquae	(ôpuhmaqâee-) /ãpəhmakʷaːiː-/, 'to turn (oneself) around'
/aːã/	aon, aô, aâ, ꝏwan	(âô)	quénꝏwantam-	(qunuwâôtam-) /kʷənəwaːãtam-/, 'to deny'
/aːw/	aw, au, âu, áu	(âw)	âu	(âw) /aːw/, 'he/she goes'
/aːj/	i, y, ae, ie, ei	(ây)	ashkoshqui	(ashkashqây) /aʃkaʃkʷaːj/, 'it is green'
/aːja/	io, iu	(âya)	piuk	(pâyaq) /paːjak/, 'ten'
/aːjə/	aya, ia	(âyu)	mayateau	(mayuhtyâ) /majəhtʲaː/, 'to make a path'
/jᵊa/	ea	(ea)	wettohimunneash	(wutâheemuneash) //wətaːhiːmənjᵊaʃ/, 'strawberries'
/jᵊaːã/	eao[n], eô, eâ, eo[n], eo[m]	(eâô)	wunnompeuhkohteaonk	(wunôpeuhkahteâôk) /wənãpjᵊəhkahtjᵊaːãk/, 'craftiness'
/jᵊã/	eo[m], eo[n], ea[n], ea[m], eâ, eô	(eô)	ꝏsq[ui]heonk	(wusqueeheôk) /wəskʷiːhjᵊãk/, 'her/his blood'
/jᵊə/	eu, ei, ea, eo	(eu)	wunnompeuhkohteaonk	(wunôpeuhkahteâôk) /wənãpjᵊəhkahtjᵊaːãk/, 'craftiness'
/jᵊəw/	eꝏ, euw, uuw	(euw)	woshkenunneꝏ-	(washkeenuneuw-) /waʃkiːnənjᵊəw/, 'to be young'
/iː/	e, é, i	(ee)	nek	(neek) /niːk/, 'my house'
/iːaː/	ea, éa, ia	(eeâ)	ushpeatau	(ushpeeâhtaw-) /əʃpiːaːhtaw/, 'to make raised' or 'to make go upward'
/iːə/	eu, éa, éu	(eeu)	ohkeussó-	(ahkeeuhshâ-)
/iːw/	e, é, i	(ee)	quogquiu	(qaqeew) /kʷakʷiːw/, 'he/she runs'
/iːwə/	ewe, eewe, ewi	(eewu)	péwehe-	(peewuhe-) /piːwəhə-/, 'to debase' or 'to make small'
/iːjə/	eye, eye, eyu	(eeyu)	uttꝏcheyeuꝏ	(ut8cheeyuwu-) /ətuːtʃiːjəwə-/, 'to be a time' or 'to be the (right) season'
/ã/	á, â, ô, u, a[m], a[n], o[m], o[n]	(ô)	pohpuwonk	(pôhpuwôk) /pãhpəwãk/, 'playing' or 'the act of fun play'
/ãa/	ôa, áa, óa	(ôa)	wahteauatu-)	(whatôatu-) /wahtãatə-/, 'to understand each other'
/ãaːj/	ói, ôi, ôy	(ôây)	ꝏnóiꝏ	(8nôâyuw) /nãaːjəw/, 'to be dark blue'
/ãiː/	ôé, âe, ôi	(ôee)	waénuhkauw	(wôeenuhkaw) /wãiːnəhkaw/, 'to surround'
/ãw/	o, ó, ô, au	(ôw)	keekꝏoash	(keekuwôwash)
/ãwa/	ôa. ôo, âwa	(ôwa)	magkôatik	(makôwatuk) /makãwatək/, 'that which is precious'
/ãwaː/	ou, oa, awa	(ôwâ)	moui-	(môwâwee-) /mãwaːwiː-/, 'to gather'
/uː/	ꝏ, u, oo, ó, ú	(8)	mꝏs	(m8s) /mus/, 'moose'
/uːaːã/	ꝏwo, ꝏâu, oowo	(8âô)	unnontoowaog	(unôt8âôk /ənãttuːaːãk/, (a) 'people's language'
/uːə/	ui, ꝏi	(8u)	santuit	(sôty8ut) /sãtuːət/, 'place of the sachem'
/uːw/	ꝏ, oo, úw	(8w)	mꝏi	(m8wây) /muːwaːj/, 'it is black'
/uːwa/	ua, ꝏwo, ꝏwa	(8wa)	'penꝏwoht	(peen8waht) /piːnuːwaht/, 'a stranger'
/ə/	a, e, i, o, u	(u)	umishꝏn	(umuhsh8n) /əməhʃuːn, 'his/her boat'
/əw/	u, ꝏ, uw	(uw)	pittu	(putyuw) /pətʲəw/, 'it is pitch'
/əwa/	uwa, ua, ꝏa	(uwa)	kꝏashawog	(k8shuwak) /kuːʃəwak/, 'your (pl.) fathers'
/əwiː/	ui, ae, uwe, ꝏwe	(uwee)	ôsꝏwe-	(ôsuwee-) /ãsəwiː/, 'to change'
/əwã/	uwo, ꝏô, awô	(uwô)	upꝏnukkuwoh	(up8nukuwôh) /əpuːnəkəwãh/, 'he/she (obv.) puts them'
/əj/	e, ey, ei	(uy)	peantam	(puyôhtam) /pəjãhtam/, 'to pray'
