= West Frisian alphabet =

West Frisian orthography

The West Frisian alphabet consists of the 26 letters of the Latin alphabet and 6 letters with diacritics.

== Letters ==
West Frisian alphabet
| Upper case vowels and vowels with diacritics | A | Â | E | Ê | É | I/Y | O | Ô | U | Û | Ú | | | | | | | | | |
| Lower case vowels and vowels with diacritics | a | â | e | ê | é | i/y | o | ô | u | û | ú | | | | | | | | | |
| Vowel Pronunciation | aː | ɔː | əː | ɛː | eː | iː | oː | ɔː | øː/yː | uː | yː | | | | | | | | | |
| Upper case letters | B | C | D | F | G | H | J | K | L | M | N | P | Q | R | S | T | V | W | X | Z |
| Lower case letters | b | c | d | f | g | h | j | k | l | m | n | p | q | r | s | t | v | w | x | z |
| Letter Pronunciation | beː | tseː | deː | ɛf | ɣeː | haː | jeː | kaː | ɛl | ɛm | ɛn | peː | kuː | ɛr | ɛs | teː | feː | veː | iks | tzɛd |

== Alphabetical order ==
In alphabetical listings both I and Y are usually found between H and J. When two words differ only because one has I and the other one has Y (stikje or stykje), the word with I precedes the one with Y.

In handwriting, IJ is written as a single letter (see IJ (digraph)), whereas in print the string IJ is used. In alphabetical listings IJ is most commonly considered to consist of the two letters I and J, although in dictionaries there is an entry IJ between X and Z telling the user to look browse back to I.

Alternatively, Y and IJ are rarely considered either variants of one letter positioned between X and Z, or two separate letters ordered in the alphabet as X – IJ – Y – Z. Gouden Gids bv has used the latter ordering system in the past for its bilingual (Frisian/Dutch) telephone directory "Nationale telefoongids".

Capital IJ is quite rare. It only shows in the word ijsko (ice-cream) and in some names. Capital C, V and Z are mainly used for English loanwords like cake, virtual reality and ZIP and proper nouns like Chantal, Veldman and Zorro.

Both capital and lower-case C are mainly restricted to the digraph CH. Proper nouns and English loans are exceptions. Both capital and lower case Q and X are restricted to proper nouns and English loans.

Common digraphs are:

| Digraph | IPA | Description |
|---|---|---|
| CH | [x] | voiceless velar fricative |
| NG | [ŋ] | velar nasal |
| SJ | [sʲ] | palatalised voiceless alveolar sibilant |
| ZJ | [zʲ] | palatalised voiced alveolar sibilant |

== Diacritics ==
A, E, U and O may be accompanied by circumflex or acute diacritics, as shown in the table above this article. The accented letters have sound values of their own. In handwriting, diacritics are fairly common though not obligatory on capitals. In print, diacritics are not commonly used on capital letters, and these vowels are normally replaced by their unaccented counterparts.

Letters with diacritics take no independent position in the alphabet. They are listed in the same places as their unaccented counterparts. When words differ only by the diacritics on the letters, the word with the unaccented letter precedes the one with the circumflex. That one precedes the word with the acute. Hence the order: tut, tût, tút.

Proper nouns and loanwords that are originally written in one of the Latin-script alphabets usually retain their diacritics as far as the keyboard at hand allows for. The same holds for letters not common in the Frisian alphabet.

The diaeresis or trema is used on vowel letters to indicate the onset of a new syllable.
