= Tetun alphabet =

The Tetun (or Tetum) alphabet is used to write the Tetun language. It is based on the Latin alphabet and contains 24 letters:

Majuscule Forms (also called uppercase or capital letters)
A	B	D	E	F	G	H	I	J	K	L	M	N	Ñ	O	P	R	S	T	U	V	W	X	Z
Minuscule Forms (also called lowercase or small letters)
a	b	d	e	f	g	h	i	j	k	l	m	n	ñ	o	p	r	s	t	u	v	w	x	z
International Phonetic Alphabet values
a	b	d	e	f	ɡ	h	i	ʒ	k	l	m	n	ɲ	o	p	ɾ	s	t	u	v	w	ʃ	z

The letters are named: á, bé, dé, é, efe, ge, agá, í, jota, kapa, ele, eme, ene, ene ho til, ó, pé, erre, ese, té, ú, vé, vé-kaduak, xis, zé.

The accented letters á, é, í, ó, and ú are also used.

The letter W only occurs in some words of dialectal or foreign origin.

The letters G, J, Ñ, P, V, X, and Z and the digraphs LL (ele-kaduak, /ʎ/) and RR (erre-kaduak, /r/) only occur in loanwords.

The letters C (sé), Q (ké), and Y (ípsilon) are not used in Tetun, except in foreign proper names and international symbols.

The apostrophe (kapa-tatolan) is used to denote glottal stop.
