= Latin Extended-D =

- Range: U+A720..U+A7FF (224 code points)
- Plane: BMP
- Scripts: Latin (201 char.); Common (5 char.)
- Major alphabets: IPA; UPA; Medieval characters Mayanist transcription African languages
- Assigned: 206 code points
- Unused: 18 reserved code points
- Source standards: MUFI

Unicode Version History
- 5.0 (2006): 2 (+2)
- 5.1 (2008): 114 (+112)
- 6.0 (2010): 129 (+15)
- 6.1 (2012): 134 (+5)
- 7.0 (2014): 152 (+18)
- 8.0 (2015): 159 (+7)
- 9.0 (2016): 160 (+1)
- 11.0 (2018): 163 (+3)
- 12.0 (2019): 174 (+11)
- 13.0 (2020): 180 (+6)
- 14.0 (2021): 193 (+13)
- 16.0 (2024): 199 (+6)
- 17.0 (2025): 204 (+5)
- 18.0 (2026): 206 (+2)

Unicode documentation
- Code chart ∣ Web page

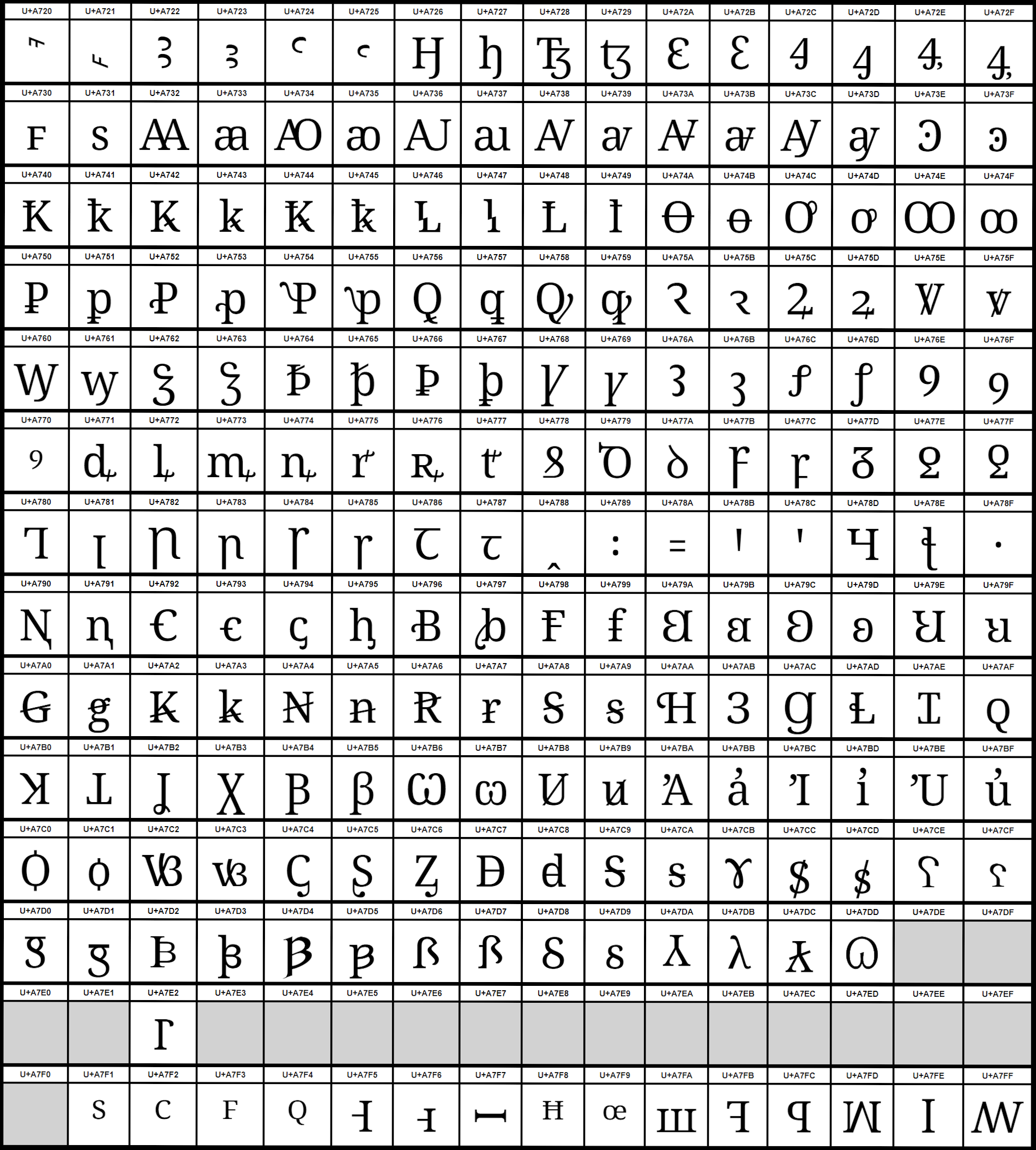
Graphical representation of the Latin Extended-D Unicode block

Latin Extended-D is a Unicode block containing Latin characters for phonetic, Mayanist, and Medieval transcription and notation systems. 89 of the characters in this block are for medieval characters proposed by the Medieval Unicode Font Initiative, many of which are representative of scribal abbreviations used in Medieval manuscript texts.

== Block ==
Latin Extended-D^{[1]}^{[2]} Official Unicode Consortium code chart (PDF)
	0	1	2	3	4	5	6	7	8	9	A	B	C	D	E	F
U+A72x	꜠	꜡	Ꜣ	ꜣ	Ꜥ	ꜥ	Ꜧ	ꜧ	Ꜩ	ꜩ	Ꜫ	ꜫ	Ꜭ	ꜭ	Ꜯ	ꜯ
U+A73x	ꜰ	ꜱ	Ꜳ	ꜳ	Ꜵ	ꜵ	Ꜷ	ꜷ	Ꜹ	ꜹ	Ꜻ	ꜻ	Ꜽ	ꜽ	Ꜿ	ꜿ
U+A74x	Ꝁ	ꝁ	Ꝃ	ꝃ	Ꝅ	ꝅ	Ꝇ	ꝇ	Ꝉ	ꝉ	Ꝋ	ꝋ	Ꝍ	ꝍ	Ꝏ	ꝏ
U+A75x	Ꝑ	ꝑ	Ꝓ	ꝓ	Ꝕ	ꝕ	Ꝗ	ꝗ	Ꝙ	ꝙ	Ꝛ	ꝛ	Ꝝ	ꝝ	Ꝟ	ꝟ
U+A76x	Ꝡ	ꝡ	Ꝣ	ꝣ	Ꝥ	ꝥ	Ꝧ	ꝧ	Ꝩ	ꝩ	Ꝫ	ꝫ	Ꝭ	ꝭ	Ꝯ	ꝯ
U+A77x	ꝰ	ꝱ	ꝲ	ꝳ	ꝴ	ꝵ	ꝶ	ꝷ	ꝸ	Ꝺ	ꝺ	Ꝼ	ꝼ	Ᵹ	Ꝿ	ꝿ
U+A78x	Ꞁ	ꞁ	Ꞃ	ꞃ	Ꞅ	ꞅ	Ꞇ	ꞇ	ꞈ	꞉	꞊	Ꞌ	ꞌ	Ɥ	ꞎ	ꞏ
U+A79x	Ꞑ	ꞑ	Ꞓ	ꞓ	ꞔ	ꞕ	Ꞗ	ꞗ	Ꞙ	ꞙ	Ꞛ	ꞛ	Ꞝ	ꞝ	Ꞟ	ꞟ
U+A7Ax	Ꞡ	ꞡ	Ꞣ	ꞣ	Ꞥ	ꞥ	Ꞧ	ꞧ	Ꞩ	ꞩ	Ɦ	Ɜ	Ɡ	Ɬ	Ɪ	ꞯ
U+A7Bx	Ʞ	Ʇ	Ʝ	Ꭓ	Ꞵ	ꞵ	Ꞷ	ꞷ	Ꞹ	ꞹ	Ꞻ	ꞻ	Ꞽ	ꞽ	Ꞿ	ꞿ
U+A7Cx	Ꟁ	ꟁ	Ꟃ	ꟃ	Ꞔ	Ʂ	Ᶎ	Ꟈ	ꟈ	Ꟊ	ꟊ	Ɤ	Ꟍ	ꟍ	꟎	꟏
U+A7Dx	Ꟑ	ꟑ	꟒	ꟓ	꟔	ꟕ	Ꟗ	ꟗ	Ꟙ	ꟙ	Ꟛ	ꟛ	Ƛ	꟝		
U+A7Ex			꟢													
U+A7Fx		꟱	ꟲ	ꟳ	ꟴ	Ꟶ	ꟶ	ꟷ	ꟸ	ꟹ	ꟺ	ꟻ	ꟼ	ꟽ	ꟾ	ꟿ
Notes 1.As of Unicode version 18.0 2.Grey areas indicate non-assigned code points

== History ==
The following Unicode-related documents record the purpose and process of defining specific characters in the Latin Extended-D block:

Version	Final code points (Note: Proposed code points and characters names may differ from final code points and names)	Count	L2 ID	WG2 ID	Document
5.0	U+A720..A721	2	L2/05-189	N2958	Lehtiranta, Juhani; Ruppel, Klaas; Suutari, Toni; Trosterud, Trond (2005-07-22), Report on progress in implementing the Uralic Phonetic Alphabet with indication of the need for additional characters and symbols
5.0	U+A720..A721	2	L2/05-261	N2989	Ruppel, Klaas; Kolehmainen, Erkki I.; Everson, Michael; Freytag, Asmus; Whistler, Ken (2005-09-13), Proposal to add six additional Uralicist characters to the UCS
5.0	U+A720..A721	2	L2/05-270		Whistler, Ken (2005-09-21), "A. Uralicist character additions", WG2 Consent Docket (Sophia Antipolis)
5.0	U+A720..A721	2	L2/05-279		Moore, Lisa (2005-11-10), "Consensus 105-C29", UTC #105 Minutes
5.0	U+A720..A721	2		N2953 (pdf, doc)	Umamaheswaran, V. S. (2006-02-16), "7.4.7", Unconfirmed minutes of WG 2 meeting 47, Sophia Antipolis, France; 2005-09-12/15
5.1	U+A722..A725	4	L2/99-246	N2043	Everson, Michael (1999-07-24), On the apostrophe and quotation mark, with a note on Egyptian transliteration characters
5.1	U+A722..A725	4	L2/00-293	N2241	Everson, Michael (2000-08-27), Proposal to add 6 Egyptological characters to the UCS
5.1	U+A722..A725	4	L2/01-050	N2253	Umamaheswaran, V. S. (2001-01-21), "7.10 Proposal to add 6 Egyptological characters", Minutes of the SC2/WG2 meeting in Athens, September 2000
5.1	U+A722..A725	4	L2/05-300		Anderson, Deborah (2005-10-13), Request for Egyptian transliteration characters as provided in N2241: Proposal to add 6 Egyptological characters to the UCS by Michael Everson
5.1	U+A722..A725	4	L2/05-279		Moore, Lisa (2005-11-10), "C.2.1", UTC #105 Minutes
5.1	U+A722..A725	4	L2/06-117R	N3078R	Proposed additions to ISO/IEC 10646:2003 Amendment 3, 2006-04-12
5.1	U+A722..A725	4		N3103 (pdf, doc)	Umamaheswaran, V. S. (2006-08-25), "M48.24", Unconfirmed minutes of WG 2 meeting 48, Mountain View, CA, USA; 2006-04-24/27
5.1	U+A722..A725	4		N3153 (pdf, doc)	Umamaheswaran, V. S. (2007-02-16), "M49.1d", Unconfirmed minutes of WG 2 meeting 49 AIST, Akihabara, Tokyo, Japan; 2006-09-25/29
5.1	U+A726..A72F	10	L2/05-097R2		Priest, Lorna; Constable, Peter (2005-07-28), Proposal to Encode Additional Latin Phonetic and Orthographic Characters (revision 2, 2005/08/11)
5.1	U+A726..A72F	10		N2945	Priest, Lorna; Constable, Peter (2005-08-09), Proposal to Encode Additional Latin Phonetic and Orthographic Characters
5.1	U+A726..A72F	10	L2/06-028	N3028	Everson, Michael (2006-01-30), Proposal to add Mayanist Latin letters to the UCS
5.1	U+A726..A72F	10	L2/06-008R2		Moore, Lisa (2006-02-13), "C.15", UTC #106 Minutes
5.1	U+A726..A72F	10	L2/06-114	N3074	Anderson, Deborah (2006-04-08), Expert Input on "Proposal to add Mayanist Latin letters to the UCS" N3028 (=L2/06-028)
5.1	U+A726..A72F	10	L2/06-121	N3082	Everson, Michael (2006-04-10), Revised proposal to add Mayanist Latin letters
5.1	U+A726..A72F	10	L2/06-133	N3094	Everson, Michael (2006-04-16), Discussion of the Mayanist Latin letter CUATRILLO WITH COMMA
5.1	U+A726..A72F	10	L2/06-108		Moore, Lisa (2006-05-25), "C.15", UTC #107 Minutes
5.1	U+A726..A72F	10		N3103 (pdf, doc)	Umamaheswaran, V. S. (2006-08-25), "M48.2", Unconfirmed minutes of WG 2 meeting 48, Mountain View, CA, USA; 2006-04-24/27
5.1	U+A730..A778	73	L2/98-214	N1747	Everson, Michael (1998-05-25), Contraction characters for the UCS
5.1	U+A730..A778	73	L2/98-281R (pdf, html)		Aliprand, Joan (1998-07-31), "Characters from ISO 5426-2 (IV.C.5-6)", Unconfirmed Minutes – UTC #77 & NCITS Subgroup L2 # 174 JOINT MEETING, Redmond, WA -- July 29-31, 1998
5.1	U+A730..A778	73	L2/98-372	N1884R2 (pdf, doc)	Whistler, Ken; et al. (1998-09-22), Additional Characters for the UCS
5.1	U+A730..A778	73	L2/99-010	N1903 (pdf, html, doc)	Umamaheswaran, V. S. (1998-12-30), "8.1.5.1", Minutes of WG 2 meeting 35, London, U.K.; 1998-09-21--25
5.1	U+A730..A778	73	L2/05-183	N2957	Everson, Michael; Haugen, Odd Einar; Emiliano, António; Pedro, Susana; Grammel, Florian; Baker, Peter; Stötzner, Andreas; Dohnicht, Marcus; Luft, Diana (2005-08-02), Preliminary proposal to add medievalist characters to the UCS
5.1	U+A730..A778	73	L2/06-027	N3027	Everson, Michael; Baker, Peter; Emiliano, António; Grammel, Florian; Haugen, Odd Einar; Luft, Diana; Pedro, Susana; Schumacher, Gerd; Stötzner, Andreas (2006-01-30), Proposal to add Medievalist characters to the UCS
5.1	U+A730..A778	73	L2/06-049		Pedro, Susana (2006-01-31), Letter of support for Medievalist letters (L2/06-027)
5.1	U+A730..A778	73	L2/06-048		Emiliano, Antonio (2006-02-02), Letter of support for Medievalist letters (L2/06-027)
5.1	U+A730..A778	73	L2/06-008R2		Moore, Lisa (2006-02-13), "C.14", UTC #106 Minutes
5.1	U+A730..A778	73		N2953 (pdf, doc)	Umamaheswaran, V. S. (2006-02-16), "7.4.6", Unconfirmed minutes of WG 2 meeting 47, Sophia Antipolis, France; 2005-09-12/15
5.1	U+A730..A778	73	L2/06-074R	N3039R	Feedback on N3027 Proposal to add Medievalist Characters, 2006-03-16
5.1	U+A730..A778	73	L2/06-101	N3060	Feedback on N3027 "Proposal to add medievalist characters to the UCS", 2006-03-27
5.1	U+A730..A778	73	L2/06-116	N3077	Everson, Michael; Baker, Peter; Emiliano, António; Grammel, Florian; Haugen, Odd Einar; Luft, Diana; Pedro, Susana; Schumacher, Gerd; Stötzner, Andreas (2006-03-31), Response to UTC/US contribution N3037R, "Feedback on N3027 Proposal to add medievalist characters"
5.1	U+A730..A778	73	L2/06-108		Moore, Lisa (2006-05-25), "C.14", UTC #107 Minutes
5.1	U+A730..A778	73		N3103 (pdf, doc)	Umamaheswaran, V. S. (2006-08-25), "M48.14", Unconfirmed minutes of WG 2 meeting 48, Mountain View, CA, USA; 2006-04-24/27
5.1	U+A730..A778	73	L2/06-318	N3160	Response to Project Editor's contribution N3146, "Draft disposition of comments on SC2 N3875 (PDAM text for Amendment 3.2 to ISO/IEC 10646:2003)", 2006-09-21
5.1	U+A730..A778	73	L2/19-250		Anderson, Debbie; Whistler, Ken; Lunde, Ken (2019-06-29), "I. Latin Letter Thorn with Diagonal Stroke [Affects U+A764 and U+A765]", WG2 Consent Docket (from WG2 meeting #68)
5.1	U+A779..A787	15	L2/06-266	N3122	Everson, Michael (2006-08-06), Proposal to add Latin letters and a Greek symbol to the UCS
5.1	U+A779..A787	15	L2/06-231		Moore, Lisa (2006-08-17), "C.16", UTC #108 Minutes
5.1	U+A779..A787	15		N3153 (pdf, doc)	Umamaheswaran, V. S. (2007-02-16), "M49.3", Unconfirmed minutes of WG 2 meeting 49 AIST, Akihabara, Tokyo, Japan; 2006-09-25/29
5.1	U+A779..A787	15	L2/06-324R2		Moore, Lisa (2006-11-29), "Consensus 109-C5", UTC #109 Minutes
5.1	U+A788	1	L2/06-244R	N3140	Priest, Lorna (2006-07-20), Proposal to Encode Modifier Letter Low Circumflex Accent
5.1	U+A788	1	L2/06-231		Moore, Lisa (2006-08-17), "C.8", UTC #108 Minutes
5.1	U+A788	1		N3153 (pdf, doc)	Umamaheswaran, V. S. (2007-02-16), "M49.5a", Unconfirmed minutes of WG 2 meeting 49 AIST, Akihabara, Tokyo, Japan; 2006-09-25/29
5.1	U+A789..A78C	4	L2/04-372	N2874	Priest, Lorna (2004-10-31), Proposal to Encode Additional Latin Orthographic Characters
5.1	U+A789..A78C	4	L2/05-097R		Priest, Lorna; Constable, Peter (2005-03-31), Proposal to Encode Additional Latin Phonetic and Orthographic Characters
5.1	U+A789..A78C	4	L2/05-105		Esling, John (2005-05-02), Letter in support of additions to IPA block
5.1	U+A789..A78C	4	L2/05-180		Moore, Lisa (2005-08-17), "Latin additions (C.19)", UTC #104 Minutes
5.1	U+A789..A78C	4	L2/06-279		Constable, Peter (2006-08-03), Letters to Lorna Priest and Peter Constable from Fernando Nava
5.1	U+A789..A78C	4	L2/06-294		Priest, Lorna (2006-08-04), Letter of support for L2/06-259 from Sotero Ramirez
5.1	U+A789..A78C	4	L2/06-259R	N3216	Constable, Peter; Priest, Lorna (2006-10-20), Proposal to Encode Additional Orthographic and Modifier Characters
5.1	U+A789..A78C	4	L2/06-324R2		Moore, Lisa (2006-11-29), "Consensus 109-C23", UTC #109 Minutes
5.1	U+A789..A78C	4	L2/07-268	N3253 (pdf, doc)	Umamaheswaran, V. S. (2007-07-26), "M50.21", Unconfirmed minutes of WG 2 meeting 50, Frankfurt-am-Main, Germany; 2007-04-24/27
5.1	U+A7FB..A7FF	5	L2/06-269	N3218	Perry, David J. (2006-08-01), Proposal to Add Additional Ancient Roman Characters to UCS
5.1	U+A7FB..A7FF	5	L2/06-324R2		Moore, Lisa (2006-11-29), "Consensus 109-C33", UTC #109 Minutes
5.1	U+A7FB..A7FF	5	L2/07-268	N3253 (pdf, doc)	Umamaheswaran, V. S. (2007-07-26), "M50.24", Unconfirmed minutes of WG 2 meeting 50, Frankfurt-am-Main, Germany; 2007-04-24/27
6.0	U+A78D..A78E	2	L2/08-182	N3481	Priest, Lorna (2008-07-28), Proposal to Encode Additional Latin and Cyrillic Characters
6.0	U+A78D..A78E	2	L2/08-161R2		Moore, Lisa (2008-11-05), "Consensus 115-C29", UTC #115 Minutes
6.0	U+A78D..A78E	2	L2/08-412	N3553 (pdf, doc)	Umamaheswaran, V. S. (2008-11-05), "M53.24a", Unconfirmed minutes of WG 2 meeting 53
6.0	U+A790..A791	2	L2/08-361		Moore, Lisa (2008-12-02), "Consensus 117-C29", UTC #117 Minutes
6.0	U+A790..A791	2	L2/08-404	N3581	Pentzlin, Karl; Yevlampiev, Ilya (2009-03-16), Proposal to encode four Latin letters
6.0	U+A790..A791	2	L2/09-234	N3603 (pdf, doc)	Umamaheswaran, V. S. (2009-07-08), "M54.13i", Unconfirmed minutes of WG 2 meeting 54
6.0	U+A7A0..A7A9	10	L2/08-405		Pentzlin, Karl (2008-10-30), Proposal to encode 10 Latin letters with diagonal stroke
6.0	U+A7A0..A7A9	10	L2/09-112R	N3587	Proposal to encode 10 Latin letters for pre-1921 Latvian orthography, 2009-03-26
6.0	U+A7A0..A7A9	10	L2/09-234	N3603 (pdf, doc)	Umamaheswaran, V. S. (2009-07-08), "10.15", Unconfirmed minutes of WG 2 meeting 54
6.0	U+A7A0..A7A9	10	L2/09-225R		Moore, Lisa (2009-08-17), "C.15", UTC #120 / L2 #217 Minutes
6.0	U+A7A0..A7A9	10		N3703 (pdf, doc)	Umamaheswaran, V. S. (2010-04-13), "M55.4", Unconfirmed minutes of WG 2 meeting no. 55, Tokyo 2009-10-26/30
6.0	U+A7FA	1	L2/09-028	N3571	Ruppel, Klaas; Aalto, Tero; Everson, Michael (2009-01-27), Proposal to encode additional characters for the Uralic Phonetic Alphabet
6.0	U+A7FA	1	L2/09-104		Moore, Lisa (2009-05-20), "Consensus 119-C28", UTC #119 / L2 #216 Minutes
6.1	U+A792..A793	2	L2/10-336R2	N3896	Priest, Lorna; Iancu, Laurențiu; Everson, Michael (2010-10-14), Proposal to encode C WITH BAR
6.1	U+A792..A793	2	L2/10-416R		Moore, Lisa (2010-11-09), "Consensus 125-C21", UTC #125 / L2 #222 Minutes
6.1	U+A792..A793	2		N3903 (pdf, doc)	"M57.02j", Unconfirmed minutes of WG2 meeting 57, 2011-03-31
6.1	U+A7AA	1	L2/10-166	N3840	Priest, Lorna (2010-05-03), Proposal to encode Latin Capital Letter H with Hook
6.1	U+A7AA	1	L2/10-108		Moore, Lisa (2010-05-19), "C.13.1", UTC #123 / L2 #220 Minutes
6.1	U+A7AA	1	L2/10-268		Priest, Lorna (2010-07-29), Annotation additions resulting from encoding LATIN CAPITAL LETTER H WITH HOOK
6.1	U+A7AA	1		N3903 (pdf, doc)	"M57.02c", Unconfirmed minutes of WG2 meeting 57, 2011-03-31
6.1	U+A7F8..A7F9	2	L2/10-161	N3846	Pentzlin, Karl (2010-04-30), Proposal to encode two missing modifier letters for extended IPA
6.1	U+A7F8..A7F9	2	L2/10-108		Moore, Lisa (2010-05-19), "C.23", UTC #123 / L2 #220 Minutes
6.1	U+A7F8..A7F9	2		N3903 (pdf, doc)	"M57.02c", Unconfirmed minutes of WG2 meeting 57, 2011-03-31
7.0	U+A794..A795	2	L2/10-357	N3914	Proposal to add characters used in Lithuanian dialectology to the UCS, 2010-10-29
7.0	U+A794..A795	2	L2/11-135		Tumasonis, Vladas; Pentzlin, Karl (2011-05-02), Revised proposal to add characters used in Lithuanian dialectology
7.0	U+A794..A795	2	L2/11-189		Whistler, Ken; Constable, Peter (2011-05-11), Review of Characters for Lithuanian Dialectology
7.0	U+A794..A795	2	L2/11-191	N4062	Constable, Peter; Whistler, Ken (2011-05-13), USNB Comments on N3914 -Characters for Lithuanian Dialectology
7.0	U+A794..A795	2	L2/11-116		Moore, Lisa (2011-05-17), "Consensus 127-C12", UTC #127 / L2 #224 Minutes, "Accept 14 characters for Lithuanian dialectology..."
7.0	U+A794..A795	2	L2/11-223	N4070	Tumasonis, Vladas; Pentzlin, Karl (2011-05-24), Second revised proposal to add characters used in Lithuanian dialectology to the UCS
7.0	U+A794..A795	2	L2/11-248	N4116	Pentzlin, Karl (2011-06-09), Report on the ad hoc re "Lithuanian dialectology" (SC2/WG2 N4070) held during the SC2/WG2 meeting at Helsinki
7.0	U+A794..A795	2		N4103	"11.1.3 Lithuanian dialectology", Unconfirmed minutes of WG 2 meeting 58, 2012-01-03
7.0	U+A796..A797, A7AB..A7AC, A7F7	5	L2/11-134R	N4030R	Everson, Michael (2011-05-04), Proposal for the addition of six Latin characters to the UCS
7.0	U+A796..A797, A7AB..A7AC, A7F7	5	L2/12-082	N4030R2	Everson, Michael (2012-02-08), Proposal for the addition of five Latin characters to the UCS
7.0	U+A796..A797, A7AB..A7AC, A7F7	5	L2/12-007		Moore, Lisa (2012-02-14), "C.11", UTC #130 / L2 #227 Minutes
7.0	U+A796..A797, A7AB..A7AC, A7F7	5		N4253 (pdf, doc)	"M59.16m", Unconfirmed minutes of WG 2 meeting 59, 2012-09-12
7.0	U+A798..A79F	8	L2/08-428	N3555	Everson, Michael (2008-11-27), Exploratory proposal to encode Germanicist, Nordicist, and other phonetic characters in the UCS
7.0	U+A798..A79F	8	L2/09-256		Ellert, Mattias (2009-07-31), Comments on ISO/IEC JTC1/SC2/WG2 N3555 / L2/08-428
7.0	U+A798..A79F	8	L2/10-346	N3907	Everson, Michael; Wandl-Vogt, Eveline; Dicklberger, Alois (2010-09-23), Preliminary proposal to encode "Teuthonista" phonetic characters in the UCS
7.0	U+A798..A79F	8	L2/11-137	N4031	Everson, Michael; Wandl-Vogt, Eveline; Dicklberger, Alois (2011-05-09), Proposal to encode "Teuthonista" phonetic characters in the UCS
7.0	U+A798..A79F	8	L2/11-203	N4082	Everson, Michael; et al. (2011-05-27), Support for "Teuthonista" encoding proposal
7.0	U+A798..A79F	8	L2/11-202	N4081	Everson, Michael; Dicklberger, Alois; Pentzlin, Karl; Wandl-Vogt, Eveline (2011-06-02), Revised proposal to encode "Teuthonista" phonetic characters in the UCS
7.0	U+A798..A79F	8	L2/11-240	N4106	Everson, Michael; Pentzlin, Karl (2011-06-09), Report on the ad hoc re "Teuthonista" (SC2/WG2 N4081) held during the SC2/WG2 meeting at Helsinki
7.0	U+A798..A79F	8	L2/11-261R2		Moore, Lisa (2011-08-16), "Consensus 128-C38", UTC #128 / L2 #225 Minutes, "Approve 85 characters for German dialectology..."
7.0	U+A798..A79F	8		N4103	"11.16 Teuthonista phonetic characters", Unconfirmed minutes of WG 2 meeting 58, 2012-01-03
7.0	U+A798..A79F	8	L2/12-269	N4296	Request to change the names of three Teuthonista characters under ballot, 2012-07-26
7.0	U+A798..A79F	8	L2/22-196		Jacquerye, Denis Moyogo (2022-06-27), On LATIN CAPITAL LETTER F WITH STROKE [Affects U+A798]
7.0	U+A798..A79F	8	L2/22-248		Anderson, Deborah; et al. (2022-10-31), "1a CAPITAL LETTER F WITH STROKE", Recommendations to UTC #173 October 2022 on Script Proposals
7.0	U+A798..A79F	8	L2/22-241		Constable, Peter (2022-11-09), "Consensus 173-C24", Approved Minutes of UTC Meeting 173, "Accept the glyph change for U+A798 LATIN CAPITAL LETTER F WITH STROKE"
7.0	U+A7AD	1	L2/12-080	N4228	Jensen, Joshua M.; Pentzlin, Karl (2012-02-08), Proposal to encode a Latin Capital Letter L with Belt
7.0	U+A7AD	1	L2/12-007		Moore, Lisa (2012-02-14), "C.34", UTC #130 / L2 #227 Minutes
7.0	U+A7AD	1		N4253 (pdf, doc)	"M59.16n", Unconfirmed minutes of WG 2 meeting 59, 2012-09-12
7.0	U+A7B0..A7B1	2	L2/12-270	N4297	Everson, Michael; Jacquerye, Denis; Lilley, Chris (2012-07-26), Proposal for the addition of ten Latin characters to the UCS
7.0	U+A7B0..A7B1	2	L2/12-239		Moore, Lisa (2012-08-14), "C.14", UTC #132 Minutes
8.0	U+A78F	1	L2/09-031R	N3567	West, Andrew (2009-04-04), Proposal to encode a Middle Dot letter for Phags-pa transliteration
8.0	U+A78F	1	L2/09-234	N3603 (pdf, doc)	Umamaheswaran, V. S. (2009-07-08), "M54.13c", Unconfirmed minutes of WG 2 meeting 54
8.0	U+A78F	1	L2/09-278	N3678	Anderson, Deborah (2009-08-05), On the proposed U+A78F LATIN LETTER MIDDLE DOT (L2/09-031R = N3567)
8.0	U+A78F	1	L2/09-332	N3694	West, Andrew (2009-10-05), Rationale for Encoding Latin Letter Middle Dot
8.0	U+A78F	1	L2/09-392		Anderson, Deborah (2009-10-21), Comments on N3694 "Rationale for encoding LATIN LETTER MIDDLE DOT"
8.0	U+A78F	1	L2/10-118	N3812	Bibiko, Hans-Jörg (2010-04-07), On the proposed U+A78F LATIN LETTER MIDDLE DOT (L2/09-031R = N3567)
8.0	U+A78F	1	L2/10-124		Hill, Nathan (2010-04-14), Latin letter middle dot
8.0	U+A78F	1		N3803 (pdf, doc)	"M56.02", Unconfirmed minutes of WG 2 meeting no. 56, 2010-09-24
8.0	U+A78F	1	L2/10-416R		Moore, Lisa (2010-11-09), "Consensus 125-C41", UTC #125 / L2 #222 Minutes
8.0	U+A78F	1	L2/11-057	N3984	Pentzlin, Karl (2011-02-02), Notes on the naming of some characters proposed in the FCD of ISO/IEC 10646:2012
8.0	U+A78F	1		N3903 (pdf, doc)	"M57.04", Unconfirmed minutes of WG2 meeting 57, 2011-03-31
8.0	U+A78F	1		N4103	"Resolution M58.01", Unconfirmed minutes of WG 2 meeting 58, 2012-01-03
8.0	U+A78F	1		N4339 (pdf, doc)	Whistler, Ken (2012-09-21), Examples of Collation Tailoring for U+00B7 MIDDLE DOT
8.0	U+A78F	1	L2/12-361	N4340 (pdf, doc)	Whistler, Ken (2012-09-28), Comments in Response to Irish Comments on Middle Dot
8.0	U+A78F	1		N4353 (pdf, doc)	"M60.05h, M60.17", Unconfirmed minutes of WG 2 meeting 60, 2013-05-23
8.0	U+A78F	1	L2/13-132		Moore, Lisa (2013-07-29), "Consensus 136-C11", UTC #136 Minutes, "Accept U+A78F LATIN LETTER SINOLOGICAL DOT for encoding in a future version of the standard."
8.0	U+A78F	1		N4403 (pdf, doc)	Umamaheswaran, V. S. (2014-01-28), "Resolution M61.02 item c", Unconfirmed minutes of WG 2 meeting 61, Holiday Inn, Vilnius, Lithuania; 2013-06-10/14
8.0	U+A7B2	1	L2/12-320	N4332	Priest, Lorna (2012-09-27), Proposal to encode LATIN CAPITAL LETTER J WITH CROSSED-TAIL in the BMP
8.0	U+A7B2	1	L2/12-343R2		Moore, Lisa (2012-12-04), "Consensus 133-C12", UTC #133 Minutes
8.0	U+A7B2	1		N4353 (pdf, doc)	"M60.17", Unconfirmed minutes of WG 2 meeting 60, 2013-05-23
8.0	U+A7B3..A7B7	5	L2/12-270	N4297	Everson, Michael; Jacquerye, Denis; Lilley, Chris (2012-07-26), Proposal for the addition of ten Latin characters to the UCS
8.0	U+A7B3..A7B7	5	L2/12-343R2		Moore, Lisa (2012-12-04), "Consensus 133-C12", UTC #133 Minutes
8.0	U+A7B3..A7B7	5		N4353 (pdf, doc)	"M60.17", Unconfirmed minutes of WG 2 meeting 60, 2013-05-23
8.0	U+A7B3..A7B7	5	L2/13-163		Jacquerye, Denis (2013-07-24), Gabonese and Ivorian Latin characters
9.0	U+A7AE	1	L2/12-035	N4195	Everson, Michael (2012-01-28), Preliminary proposal to encode "Unifon" characters
9.0	U+A7AE	1	L2/12-138	N4262	Everson, Michael (2012-04-29), Proposal to encode "Unifon" and other characters in the UCS
9.0	U+A7AE	1	L2/12-270	N4297	Everson, Michael; Jacquerye, Denis; Lilley, Chris (2012-07-26), Proposal for the addition of ten Latin characters to the UCS
9.0	U+A7AE	1	L2/13-163		Jacquerye, Denis (2013-07-24), Gabonese and Ivorian Latin characters
9.0	U+A7AE	1	L2/14-070	N4549	Everson, Michael (2014-02-24), Revised proposal to encode Unifon characters in the UCS
9.0	U+A7AE	1	L2/14-100		Moore, Lisa (2014-05-13), "Consensus 139-C16", UTC #139 Minutes
9.0	U+A7AE	1		N4553 (pdf, doc)	Umamaheswaran, V. S. (2014-09-16), "M62.09f, M62.09l", Minutes of WG 2 meeting 62 Adobe, San Jose, CA, USA
11.0	U+A7AF	1	L2/11-208	N4068	Proposal to encode missing Latin small capital and modifier letters, 2011-03-12
11.0	U+A7AF	1	L2/15-241		Barmeier, Severin (2015-10-10), Proposal to encode Latin small capital letter Q
11.0	U+A7AF	1	L2/16-004		Moore, Lisa (2016-02-01), "C.4.1", UTC #146 Minutes
11.0	U+A7AF	1	L2/17-018		McGowan, Rick (2017-01-18), Comments on Public Review Issues (Nov 7, 2016 - Jan 18, 2017)
11.0	U+A7B8..A7B9	2	L2/14-201		Jacquerye, Denis (2014-08-07), Proposal to encode two Latin characters for Mazahua
11.0	U+A7B8..A7B9	2	L2/14-177		Moore, Lisa (2014-10-17), "Latin Characters for Mazahua (C.4.3)", UTC #140 Minutes
11.0	U+A7B8..A7B9	2	L2/16-032		Jacquerye, Denis (2016-01-22), Proposal to encode two Latin characters for Mazahua
11.0	U+A7B8..A7B9	2	L2/16-004		Moore, Lisa (2016-02-01), "C.4.2", UTC #146 Minutes
12.0	U+A7BA..A7BF	6	L2/99-246	N2043	Everson, Michael (1999-07-24), On the apostrophe and quotation mark, with a note on Egyptian transliteration characters
12.0	U+A7BA..A7BF	6	L2/00-293	N2241	Everson, Michael (2000-08-27), Proposal to add 6 Egyptological characters to the UCS
12.0	U+A7BA..A7BF	6	L2/01-050	N2253	Umamaheswaran, V. S. (2001-01-21), "7.10 Proposal to add 6 Egyptological characters", Minutes of the SC2/WG2 meeting in Athens, September 2000
12.0	U+A7BA..A7BF	6	L2/05-300		Anderson, Deborah (2005-10-13), Request for Egyptian transliteration characters as provided in N2241: Proposal to add 6 Egyptological characters to the UCS by Michael Everson
12.0	U+A7BA..A7BF	6		N3103 (pdf, doc)	Umamaheswaran, V. S. (2006-08-25), "M48.24", Unconfirmed minutes of WG 2 meeting 48, Mountain View, CA, USA; 2006-04-24/27
12.0	U+A7BA..A7BF	6	L2/08-087	N3431	Anderson, Deborah; Mastronarde, Donald (2008-01-28), Comments on L2/08-049 (WG2 N3382) Egyptological Yod and Cyrillic Breathings
12.0	U+A7BA..A7BF	6	L2/08-003		Moore, Lisa (2008-02-14), "Consensus 114-C43", UTC #114 Minutes, "The UTC supports the position on Egyptological Yod in L2/08-087."
12.0	U+A7BA..A7BF	6	L2/08-049R	N3382R	Everson, Michael; Richmond, Bob (2008-04-08), EGYPTOLOGICAL YOD and Cyrillic breathings
12.0	U+A7BA..A7BF	6	L2/08-146	N3432	Position Paper on Egyptological Yod and Cyrillic Breathings, 2008-04-08
12.0	U+A7BA..A7BF	6	L2/08-272	N3487	Everson, Michael (2008-08-04), Proposal to encode Egyptological yod and similar characters in the UCS
12.0	U+A7BA..A7BF	6	L2/17-076R2	N4792R2	Suignard, Michel (2017-05-09), Revised proposal for the encoding of an Egyptological YOD and Ugaritic characters
12.0	U+A7BA..A7BF	6	L2/17-103		Moore, Lisa (2017-05-18), "Consensus 151-C15", UTC #151 Minutes
12.0	U+A7BA..A7BF	6	L2/17-362		Moore, Lisa (2018-02-02), "B.1.3.1.1.1. Names of A7BA to A7BF", UTC #153 Minutes
12.0	U+A7BA..A7BF	6	L2/18-183		Moore, Lisa (2018-11-20), "Consensus 156-C12", UTC #156 Minutes
12.0	U+A7BA..A7BF	6		N5020 (pdf, doc)	Umamaheswaran, V. S. (2019-01-11), "7.4.1 E2", Unconfirmed minutes of WG 2 meeting 67
12.0	U+A7C2..A7C3	2	L2/17-238	N4838	Everson, Michael (2017-07-26), Proposal to add LATIN LETTER ANGLICANA W to the UCS
12.0	U+A7C2..A7C3	2	L2/17-222		Moore, Lisa (2017-08-11), "C.18", UTC #152 Minutes
12.0	U+A7C2..A7C3	2		N4953 (pdf, doc)	"M66.15c", Unconfirmed minutes of WG 2 meeting 66, 2018-03-23
12.0	U+A7C2..A7C3	2		N5020 (pdf, doc)	Umamaheswaran, V. S. (2019-01-11), "7.4.1 E1", Unconfirmed minutes of WG 2 meeting 67
12.0	U+A7C4..A7C6	3	L2/17-013	N4782	West, Andrew; Chan, Eiso; Everson, Michael (2017-01-16), Proposal to encode three uppercase Latin letters used in early Pinyin
12.0	U+A7C4..A7C6	3		N4953 (pdf, doc)	"M66.15a", Unconfirmed minutes of WG 2 meeting 66, 2018-03-23
12.0	U+A7C4..A7C6	3	L2/17-362		Moore, Lisa (2018-02-02), "Consensus 153-C6", UTC #153 Minutes
13.0	U+A7C7..A7CA	4	L2/12-270	N4297	Everson, Michael; Jacquerye, Denis; Lilley, Chris (2012-07-26), Proposal for the addition of ten Latin characters to the UCS
13.0	U+A7C7..A7CA	4	L2/19-179	N5044	Everson, Michael; Lilley, Chris (2019-05-26), Proposal for the addition of four Latin characters for Gaulish
13.0	U+A7C7..A7CA	4		N5095	Anderson, Deborah; Whistler, Ken; Pournader, Roozbeh; Liang, Hai; Constable, Peter; Moore, Lisa (2019-06-10), "Four Latin Characters", Comments on WG2 #68 documents
13.0	U+A7C7..A7CA	4		N5122	"M68.05", Unconfirmed minutes of WG 2 meeting 68, 2019-12-31
13.0	U+A7C7..A7CA	4	L2/19-270		Moore, Lisa (2019-10-07), "Consensus 160-C12", UTC #160 Minutes
13.0	U+A7F5..A7F6	2	L2/19-092	N5039	West, Andrew; Everson, Michael (2019-03-25), Proposal to encode Latin Letter Reversed Half H
13.0	U+A7F5..A7F6	2	L2/19-173		Anderson, Deborah; et al. (2019-04-29), "Latin Letter Reversed Half H", Recommendations to UTC #159 April-May 2019 on Script Proposals
13.0	U+A7F5..A7F6	2	L2/19-122		Moore, Lisa (2019-05-08), "C.7.2", UTC #159 Minutes
13.0	U+A7F5..A7F6	2		N5122	"M68.05", Unconfirmed minutes of WG 2 meeting 68, 2019-12-31
13.0	U+A7F5..A7F6	2	L2/19-286		Anderson, Deborah; Whistler, Ken; Pournader, Roozbeh; Moore, Lisa; Liang, Hai (2019-07-22), "c. LATIN LETTER REVERSED HALF H", Recommendations to UTC #160 July 2019 on Script Proposals
13.0	U+A7F5..A7F6	2	L2/20-052		Pournader, Roozbeh (2020-01-15), Changes to Identifier_Type of some Unicode 13.0 characters
13.0	U+A7F5..A7F6	2	L2/20-015R		Moore, Lisa (2020-05-14), "B.13.4 Changes to Identifier_Type of some Unicode 13.0 characters", Draft Minutes of UTC Meeting 162
14.0	U+A7C0..A7C1	2	L2/21-039		Bunčić, Daniel (2021-01-12), Proposal to include the letter 'Old Polish O'
14.0	U+A7C0..A7C1	2	L2/21-016R		Anderson, Deborah; Whistler, Ken; Pournader, Roozbeh; Moore, Lisa; Liang, Hai (2021-01-14), "3j. Old Polish Nasal Vowel Letter", Recommendations to UTC #166 January 2021 on Script Proposals
14.0	U+A7C0..A7C1	2	L2/21-009		Moore, Lisa (2021-01-27), "B.1 — 3j. Old Polish Nasal Vowel Letter", UTC #166 Minutes
14.0	U+A7D0..A7D1, A7D3, A7D5	4	L2/19-178	N5043	Everson, Michael; West, Andrew (2019-06-10), Proposal to add ten characters for Middle English
14.0	U+A7D0..A7D1, A7D3, A7D5	4	L2/20-266R	N5148R	Everson, Michael; Miller, Kirk (2020-11-09), Consolidated code chart of proposed phonetic characters
14.0	U+A7D0..A7D1, A7D3, A7D5	4	L2/20-268	N5145	Everson, Michael; West, Andrew (2020-10-05), Revised proposal to add ten characters for Middle English to the UCS
14.0	U+A7D0..A7D1, A7D3, A7D5	4	L2/21-016R		Anderson, Deborah; Whistler, Ken; Pournader, Roozbeh; Moore, Lisa; Liang, Hai (2021-01-14), "3l. Ten Characters for Middle English (Ormulum)", Recommendations to UTC #166 January 2021 on Script Proposals
14.0	U+A7D0..A7D1, A7D3, A7D5	4	L2/21-009		Moore, Lisa (2021-01-27), "B.1 — 3l. Ten Characters for Middle English (Ormulum)", UTC #166 Minutes
14.0	U+A7D6..A7D7	2	L2/19-180R	N5045R	Everson, Michael (2019-04-25), Proposal to add two characters for Middle Scots to the UCS
14.0	U+A7D6..A7D7	2		N5095	Anderson, Deborah; Whistler, Ken; Pournader, Roozbeh; Liang, Hai; Constable, Peter; Moore, Lisa (2019-06-10), "Two Characters for Middle Scots", Comments on WG2 #68 documents
14.0	U+A7D6..A7D7	2	L2/19-286		Anderson, Deborah; Whistler, Ken; Pournader, Roozbeh; Moore, Lisa; Liang, Hai (2019-07-22), "d. Two Characters for Middle Scots", Recommendations to UTC #160 July 2019 on Script Proposals
14.0	U+A7D6..A7D7	2	L2/19-270		Moore, Lisa (2019-10-07), "C.7.7", UTC #160 Minutes
14.0	U+A7D6..A7D7	2	L2/19-343		Anderson, Deborah; Whistler, Ken; Pournader, Roozbeh; Moore, Lisa; Liang, Hai (2019-10-06), "c. Middle Scots", Recommendations to UTC #161 October 2019 on Script Proposals
14.0	U+A7D6..A7D7	2	L2/20-267	N5144	Everson, Michael (2020-10-01), Revised proposal to add two characters for Middle Scots
14.0	U+A7D6..A7D7	2	L2/20-266R	N5148R	Everson, Michael; Miller, Kirk (2020-11-09), Consolidated code chart of proposed phonetic characters
14.0	U+A7D6..A7D7	2	L2/21-016R		Anderson, Deborah; Whistler, Ken; Pournader, Roozbeh; Moore, Lisa; Liang, Hai (2021-01-14), "3n. Two Characters for Middle Scots", Recommendations to UTC #166 January 2021 on Script Proposals
14.0	U+A7D6..A7D7	2	L2/21-009		Moore, Lisa (2021-01-27), "B.1 — 3n. Two Characters for Middle Scots", UTC #166 Minutes
14.0	U+A7D8..A7D9	2	L2/20-269	N5146	Everson, Michael (2020-10-01), Proposal to add two SIGMOID S characters for mediaeval palaeography
14.0	U+A7D8..A7D9	2	L2/21-016R		Anderson, Deborah; Whistler, Ken; Pournader, Roozbeh; Moore, Lisa; Liang, Hai (2021-01-14), "3m. SIGMOID S", Recommendations to UTC #166 January 2021 on Script Proposals
14.0	U+A7D8..A7D9	2	L2/21-009		Moore, Lisa (2021-01-27), "B.1 — 3m. SIGMOID S", UTC #166 Minutes
14.0	U+A7F2..A7F4	3	L2/20-251		Miller, Kirk; Cornelius, Craig (2020-09-25), Unicode request for modifier Latin capital letters
14.0	U+A7F2..A7F4	3	L2/20-266R	N5148R	Everson, Michael; Miller, Kirk (2020-11-09), Consolidated code chart of proposed phonetic characters
14.0	U+A7F2..A7F4	3	L2/21-016R		Anderson, Deborah; Whistler, Ken; Pournader, Roozbeh; Moore, Lisa; Liang, Hai (2021-01-14), "3e. Modifier Latin Capital Letters", Recommendations to UTC #166 January 2021 on Script Proposals
14.0	U+A7F2..A7F4	3	L2/21-009		Moore, Lisa (2021-01-27), "B.1 — 3e. Modifier Latin Capital Letters", UTC #166 Minutes
16.0	U+A7CB	1	L2/21-205		Jacquerye, Denis Moyogo (2021-07-26), Proposal to add capital rams horn
16.0	U+A7CB	1	L2/21-174		Anderson, Deborah; Whistler, Ken; Pournader, Roozbeh; Liang, Hai (2021-10-01), "1b. Capital Rams Horn", Recommendations to UTC #169 October 2021 on Script Proposals
16.0	U+A7CB	1	L2/22-045		Jacquerye, Denis Moyogo (2022-02-20), Proposal to add capital rams horn
16.0	U+A7CB	1	L2/22-068		Anderson, Deborah; Whistler, Ken; Pournader, Roozbeh; Constable, Peter (2022-04-15), "1a Capital Rams Horn", Recommendations to UTC #171 April 2022 on Script Proposals
16.0	U+A7CB	1	L2/22-061		Constable, Peter (2022-07-27), "Consensus 171-C15", Approved Minutes of UTC Meeting 171, "Accept U+A7CB LATIN CAPITAL LETTER RAMS HORN"
16.0	U+A7CC..A7CD	2	L2/22-113R		Miller, Kirk (2022-07-09), Unicode request for two BMP Latin characters
16.0	U+A7CC..A7CD	2	L2/22-128		Anderson, Deborah; Whistler, Ken; Pournader, Roozbeh; Constable, Peter (2022-07-20), "2b Latin Letter S with Diagonal Stroke", Recommendations to UTC #172 July 2022 on Script Proposals
16.0	U+A7CC..A7CD	2	L2/22-121		Constable, Peter (2022-08-01), "Consensus 172-C5", Draft Minutes of UTC Meeting 172, "UTC accepts ... U+A7CC LATIN CAPITAL LETTER S WITH DIAGONAL STROKE, U+A7CD LATIN SMALL LETTER S WITH DIAGONAL STROKE"
16.0	U+A7DA..A7DC	3	L2/23-191		Humchitt, Robyn; Jacquerye, Denis; King, Kevin (2023-07-17), Proposal to Encode 3 Additional Latin Characters for Wakashan and Salishan Languages to the Unicode Standard
16.0	U+A7DA..A7DC	3	L2/23-164		Anderson, Deborah; Kučera, Jan; Whistler, Ken; Pournader, Roozbeh; Constable, Peter (2023-07-21), "2a Lambda Characters", Recommendations to UTC #176 July 2023 on Script Proposals
16.0	U+A7DA..A7DC	3	L2/23-157		Constable, Peter (2023-07-31), "Consensus 176-C31", UTC #176 Minutes, "Provisionally assign U+A7DA LATIN CAPITAL LETTER LAMBDA, U+A7DB LATIN SMALL LETTER LAMBDA, and U+A7DC LATIN CAPITAL LETTER LAMBDA WITH STROKE"
16.0	U+A7DA..A7DC	3	L2/23-231		Constable, Peter (2023-12-08), "Consensus 177-C19", UTC #177 Minutes, "Add the three provisionally assigned lambda characters"
17.0	U+A7CE..A7CF	2	L2/23-219		Jacquerye, Denis Moyogo (2023-07-18), Proposal to add two Latin pharyngeal voiced fricative characters
17.0	U+A7CE..A7CF	2	L2/23-238R		Anderson, Deborah; Kučera, Jan; Whistler, Ken; Pournader, Roozbeh; Constable, Peter (2023-11-01), "2b Latin pharyngeal voiced fricative characters", Recommendations to UTC #177 November 2023 on Script Proposals
17.0	U+A7CE..A7CF	2	L2/23-231		Constable, Peter (2023-12-08), "Consensus 177-C20", UTC #177 Minutes
17.0	U+A7D2, A7D4	2	L2/19-178	N5043	Everson, Michael; West, Andrew (2019-06-10), Proposal to add ten characters for Middle English
17.0	U+A7D2, A7D4	2	L2/20-268	N5145	Everson, Michael; West, Andrew (2020-10-05), Revised proposal to add ten characters for Middle English to the UCS
17.0	U+A7D2, A7D4	2	L2/21-016R		Anderson, Deborah; Whistler, Ken; Pournader, Roozbeh; Moore, Lisa; Liang, Hai (2021-01-14), "3l. Ten Characters for Middle English (Ormulum)", Recommendations to UTC #166 January 2021 on Script Proposals
17.0	U+A7D2, A7D4	2	L2/21-009		Moore, Lisa (2021-01-27), "Action item 166-A31", UTC #166 Minutes
17.0	U+A7D2, A7D4	2	L2/23-135	N5225	Everson, Michael; West, Andrew (2023-06-01), Revised proposal to add two characters for Middle English to the UCS
17.0	U+A7D2, A7D4	2	L2/23-164		Anderson, Deborah; Kučera, Jan; Whistler, Ken; Pournader, Roozbeh; Constable, Peter (2023-07-21), "2b CAPITAL LETTER DOUBLE WYNN and LATIN CAPITAL LETTER DOUBLE THORN", Recommendations to UTC #176 July 2023 on Script Proposals
17.0	U+A7D2, A7D4	2	L2/23-157		Constable, Peter (2023-07-31), "Consensus 176-C32", UTC #176 Minutes
17.0	U+A7F1	1	L2/24-081		Miller, Kirk (2024-03-19), Unicode request for modifier capital S
17.0	U+A7F1	1	L2/24-068		Anderson, Deborah; Goregaokar, Manish; Kučera, Jan; Whistler, Ken; Pournader, Roozbeh; Constable, Peter (2024-04-18), "17. Modifier letter capital S", Recommendations to UTC #179 April 2024 on Script Proposals
17.0	U+A7F1	1	L2/24-061		Constable, Peter (2024-04-29), "Consensus 179-C61", UTC #179 Minutes, "Provisionally assign U+A7F1 MODIFIER LETTER CAPITAL S"
18.0	U+A7DD	1	L2/10-229R		Pentzlin, Karl (2010-08-04), Proposal to encode characters for the English Phonotypic Alphabet (EPA) in the UCS
18.0	U+A7DD	1	L2/10-403		Pentzlin, Karl (2010-10-24), Proposal to encode characters for the English Phonotypic Alphabet (EPA) in the UCS
18.0	U+A7DD	1	L2/11-040	N3981	Revised Proposal to encode characters for the English Phonotypic Alphabet (EPA) in the UCS, 2011-02-02
18.0	U+A7DD	1	L2/11-153		Pentzlin, Karl (2011-05-04), Second Revised Proposal to encode characters for the English Phonotypic Alphabet (EPA) in the UCS
18.0	U+A7DD	1	L2/11-225	N4079R	Pentzlin, Karl (2011-05-23), Second Revised Proposal to encode characters for the English Phonotypic Alphabet (EPA) in the UCS
18.0	U+A7DD	1	L2/24-136	N5269	Pentzlin, Karl (2024-06-05), Fourth Revised Proposal to encode characters for the English Phonotypic Alphabet (EPA) in the UCS
18.0	U+A7DD	1	L2/24-166		Anderson, Deborah; Goregaokar, Manish; Kučera, Jan; Whistler, Ken; Pournader, Roozbeh; Constable, Peter (2024-07-18), "30", Recommendations to UTC #180 July 2024 on Script Proposals
18.0	U+A7DD	1	L2/25-010		Kučera, Jan; et al. (2025-01-16), "1.6 English Phonotypic Alphabet", Recommendations to UTC #182 (January 2025) on Script Proposals
18.0	U+A7DD	1	L2/25-003		Leroy, Robin (2025-01-28), "Consensus 182-C7", UTC #182 Minutes, "Provisionally assign ..."
18.0	U+A7DD	1	L2/25-226		"Consensus 185-C40", UTC #185 Minutes, 2025-10-29, "UTC accepts for encoding in Unicode 18.0 ..."
18.0	U+A7E2	1	L2/24-237R		Jacquerye, Denis Moyogo (2024-10-30), Capital r with long leg
18.0	U+A7E2	1	L2/24-228		Kučera, Jan; et al. (2024-11-01), "2.2", Recommendations to UTC #181 (November 2024) on Script Proposals
18.0	U+A7E2	1	L2/24-221		Constable, Peter (2024-11-12), "Consensus 181-C8", UTC #181 Minutes, "Provisionally assign one code point U+A7E2 LATIN CAPITAL LETTER R WITH LONG LEG ..."
18.0	U+A7E2	1	L2/25-226		"Consensus 185-C39", UTC #185 Minutes, 2025-10-29, "UTC accepts for encoding in Unicode 18.0 ..."
