= Q with stroke =

Letter of the Latin alphabet

Ꝗ and ꝗ

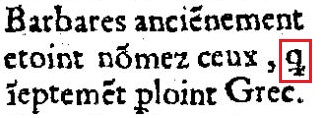
Ꝗ as used in this French-language extract of page 9 of Joachim du Bellay's 1549 work La Défense et illustration de la langue française. The text of the extract is: Barbares anciẽnement etoint nõmez ceux, ꝗ ĩeptemẽt ꝑloint Grec.

Q with stroke (Ꝗ, ꝗ) is a letter of the Latin alphabet, derived from writing the letter Q with the addition of a bar through the letter's descender. The letter was used by scribes during the Middle Ages, where it was employed primarily as an abbreviation—a modern parallel of this would be abbreviating the word "and" with an ampersand (&). The letter was also used to write some modern languages. Between 1928 and 1938, the Lezgin and Dargin alphabets had used Ꝗ, but since 1938, both corresponding languages are written with Cyrillic-based alphabets, using the digraph Кь in place of Ꝗ.

When used to write the Latin language, ꝗ could be used alone or as part of a word. Alone, it stood for quam; as part of a word, it stood for either quan- (as in ꝗdo for quando) or qui- (as in ꝗlꝫ for quilibet). In the French language, ꝗ was used as an abbreviation for the word que; in Irish, it abbreviated ar. Closely related is the letter Q with diagonal stroke (Ꝙ, ꝙ), which stood alone to abbreviate quod, qui and que in Latin. In Portuguese, ꝙ also abbreviated quem.

Q with diagonal stroke

== Computer encoding ==
Ꝗ and Ꝙ, along with other letters of interest to scholars of medieval manuscripts, was added to the Unicode Standard in 2006 after a request by Michael Everson. It resides in the Latin Extended-D block of the Basic Multilingual Plane.

Character information
Preview	Ꝗ		ꝗ		Ꝙ		ꝙ	
Unicode name	LATIN CAPITAL LETTER Q WITH; STROKE THROUGH DESCENDER		LATIN SMALL LETTER Q WITH; STROKE THROUGH DESCENDER		LATIN CAPITAL LETTER Q WITH DIAGONAL STROKE		LATIN SMALL LETTER Q WITH DIAGONAL STROKE	
Encodings	decimal	hex	dec	hex	dec	hex	dec	hex
Unicode	42838	U+A756	42839	U+A757	42840	U+A758	42841	U+A759
UTF-8	234 157 150	EA 9D 96	234 157 151	EA 9D 97	234 157 152	EA 9D 98	234 157 153	EA 9D 99
Numeric character reference	&#42838;	&#xA756;	&#42839;	&#xA757;	&#42840;	&#xA758;	&#42841;	&#xA759;
ISO 5426-2	104	68	120	78				
