= Galician alphabet =

Set of 23 Latin-script letters used to write the Galician language

The Galician alphabet is used for writing the Galician language. According to the modern and official standard, it has 23 letters and 6 digraphs. The extraneous letters ⟨j⟩, ⟨k⟩, ⟨w⟩ and ⟨y⟩ are sporadically found in foreign words, abbreviations and international symbols.

As in Portuguese and unlike in Spanish, Galician letter names are of masculine grammatical gender.

Letter	Name	Pronunciation	Phonemic values
A a	a	/a/	/a/
B b	be	/be/	/b/
C c	ce	/θe/	/θ/ (+ e, i; /s/ in seseo zones) /k/ (+ a, o, u)
D d	de	/de/	/d/
E e	e	/ɛ/	/e/, /ɛ/
F f	efe	/ˈɛfe̝/	/f/
G g	gue	/ɡe/	/ɡ/ (/x/ in gheada zones)
H h	hache	/ˈat͡ʃe̝/	/x/
I i	i	/i/	/i/, /j/
L l	ele	/ˈɛle̝/	/l/
M m	eme	/ˈɛme̝/	/m/
N n	ene	/ˈɛne̝/	/n/
Ñ ñ	eñe	/ˈɛɲe̝/	/ɲ/
O o	o	/ɔ/	/o/, /ɔ/
P p	pe	/pe/	/p/
Q q	que	/ke/	/k/
R r	erre	/ˈɛre̝/	/r/, /ɾ/
S s	ese	/ˈɛse̝/	/s/
T t	te	/te/	/t/
U u	u	/u/	/u/, /w/
V v	uve	/ˈuβe̝/	/b/, /β/, /v/
X x	xe	/ʃe/	/ʃ/, /ks/
Z z	zeta	/ˈθeta̝/	/θ/ (/s/ in seseo zones)

Digraph	Name	Phonemic values
ch	ce hache	/tʃ/
gu	gue u	/g/
ll	ele dobre	/ʎ/
nh	ene hache	/ŋ/
qu	que u	/k/
rr	erre dobre	/r/

The Medieval Galician alphabet, still used today by advocates of reintegrationism, featured the additional letters ⟨j⟩ /ʃ/ and ⟨ç⟩ /θ/ (or /s/ in areas with sigmatism) as well as the digraphs ⟨lh⟩ /ʎ/, ⟨nh⟩ /ɲ/ and ⟨ss⟩ /s/.
