= Small capital F =

Additional letter of the Latin alphabet

- ꜰ

Usage
- Writing system: Latin script

ꜰ, called small capital F, is an additional letter of the Latin alphabet which was used in the International Phonetic Alphabet and in the First Icelandic Grammatical Treatise in the Middle Ages.

== Usage ==
In the Middle Ages, the author of the First Icelandic Grammatical Treatise used ⟨ꜰ⟩ to transcribe a geminate ⟨f⟩.

Junius Henderson and John Peabody Harrington, as well as Wilfred William Robbins, John Peabody Harrington and Barbara Freire-Marreco use a small capital f ⟨ꜰ⟩ in the transcription Tewa in ethnobotanical and ethnozoological works published in 1914 and 1916.

From its beginnings until 1926, The International Phonetic Alphabet used ⟨ꜰ⟩ to represent a voiceless bilabial fricative consonant, noted [ɸ] following the Copenhagen Conference of 1925.

In 1947, Morris Swadesh used a small capital f ⟨ꜰ⟩ to phonetically transcribe a bilabial spirant consonant from Ixtlán Zapotec.

== Computer representations ==
Small capital F is encoded in Unicode under the Latin Extended-D block as U+A730 ꜰ LATIN LETTER SMALL CAPITAL F.

== See also ==
- B ʙ
- ɢ
- Ɪ ɪ
- Ʀ ʀ
- Small caps

== Bibliography ==
- Association phonétique internationale (1900). Exposé des principes de l’Association phonétique internationale. Leipzig: B. G. Teubner.
- Benediktsson, Hreinn (1972). The First Grammatical Treatise : introduction, text, notes, translation, vocabulary, facsimiles. University of Iceland Publications in Linguistics. Reykjavík: Institute of Nordic Linguistics.
- Everson, Michael; Baker, Peter; Emiliano, António; Grammel, Florian (2006). Proposal to add medievalist characters to the UCS (PDF). Everson et al. 2006.
- Henderson, Junius; Harrington, John Peabody (1914). Ethnobotany of the Tewa Indians. Washington: Government printing Office.
- Kemp, Alan (2006). "Phonetic transcription: History". In Brown, Keith (ed.). Encyclopedia of Language and Linguistics (2 ed.). Elsevier Science. pp. 396–410. doi:10.1016/B0-08-044854-2/00015-8. ISBN 978-0-08-044854-1.
- Robbins, Wilfred William; Harrington, John Peabody; Freire-Marreco, Barbara (1916). Ethnobotany of the Tewa Indians. Washington: Government printing Office.
- Swadesh, Morris (October 1947). "The Phonemic Structure of Proto-Zapotec". International Journal of American Linguistics. 13 (4): 220-230. doi:10.1086/463959.
