= Reversed F =

Letter of the Latin alphabet

- ꟻ f

Usage
- Writing system: Latin script
- Type: alphabetic
- Language of origin: Abkhaz language, Abaza language, Kabardian language, Adyghe language
- Sound values: /ʃʷ/, [fʼ]
- In Unicode: U+A7FB

History
- Development: 𓌉: 𐤅; Ϝ ϝ; 𐌅; F f; ꟻ f
- Time period: 1920s—1930s
- Transliterations: Ꚗ ꚗ, Шә шә, Фӏ фӏ

Reversed F (ꟻ f) is an additional Latin script letter used in epigraphic inscriptions to abbreviate the words filia or femina. It was also formerly used in the writing of the Abaza, the Abkhaz, the Adyghe and the Kabardian languages in the 1920s and 1930s.

== Gallery ==
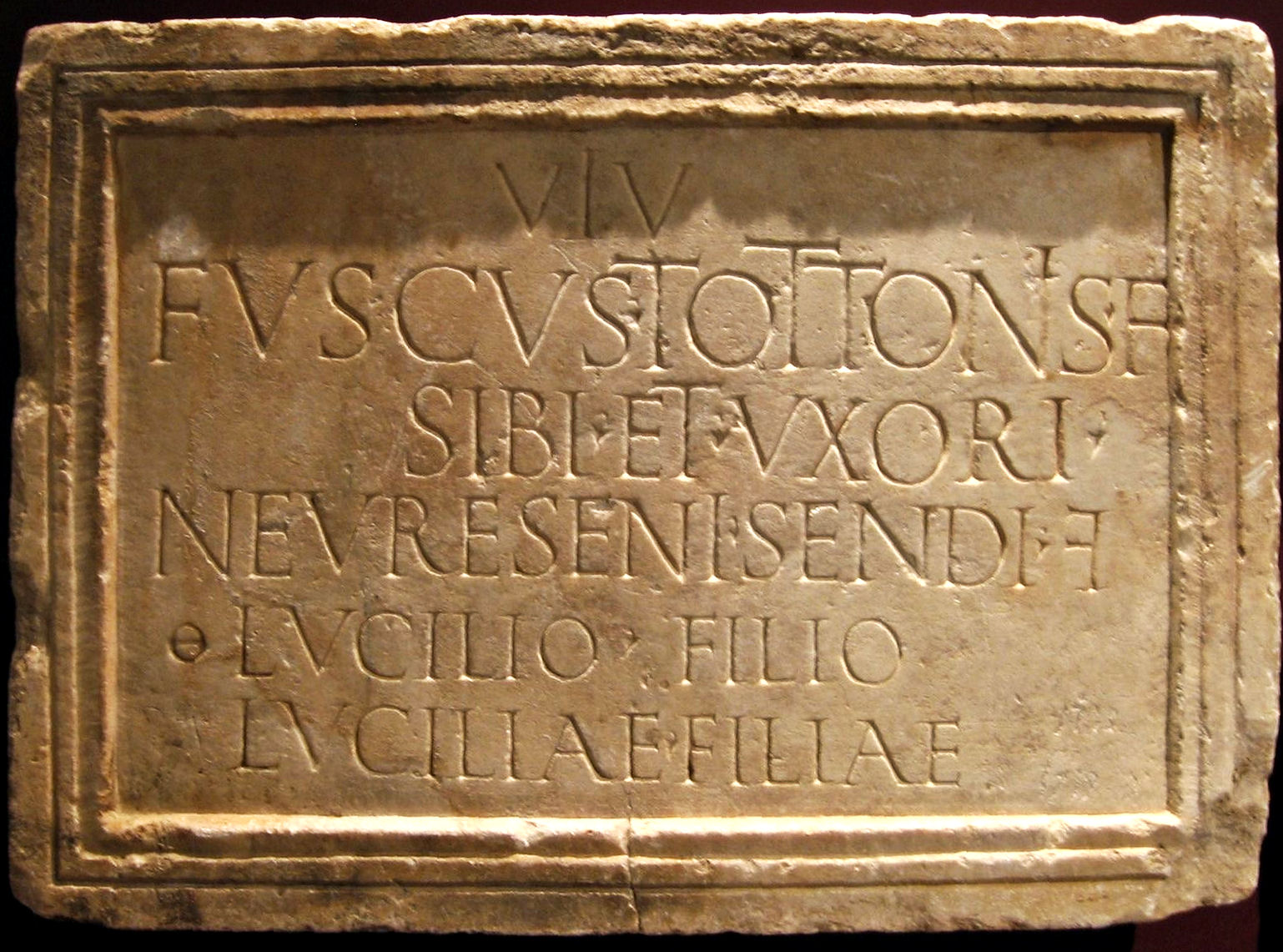
Epitaph of Fuscus at Arrien-en-Bethmale (Ariège) with reversed F to abbreviate the word filiae.

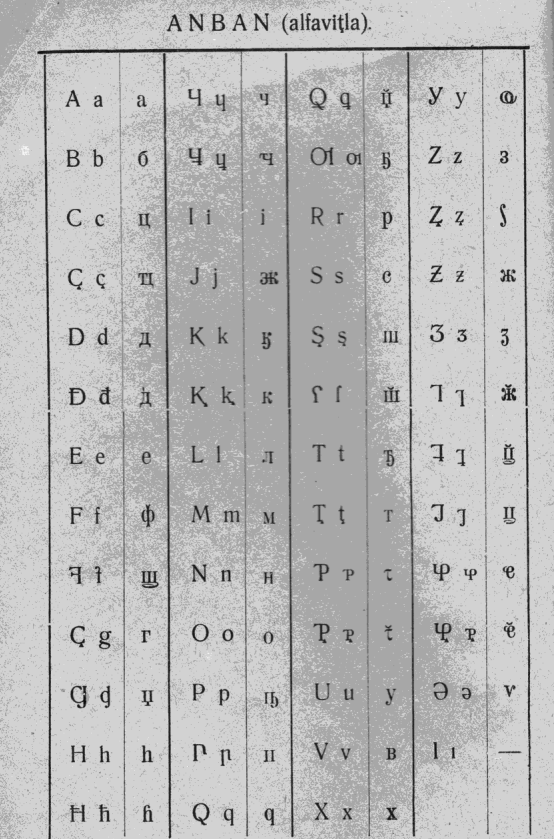
Abkhaz Latin alphabet of 1930.

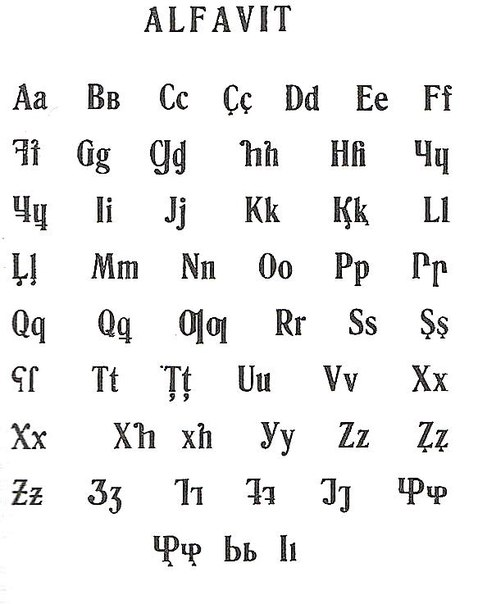
Abaza Latin alphabet of 1932.

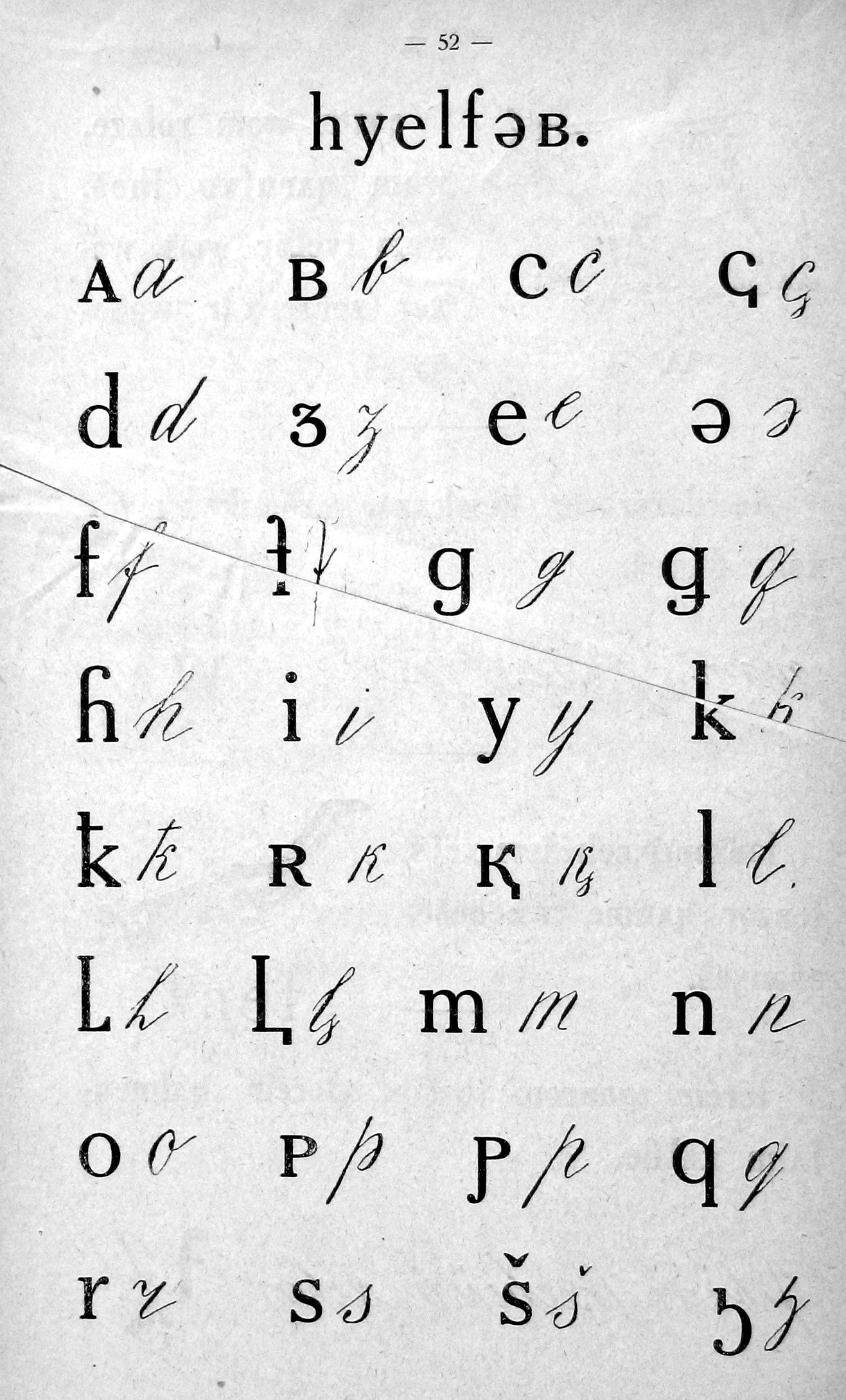
Adyghe Latin alphabet of 1927 (page 1)

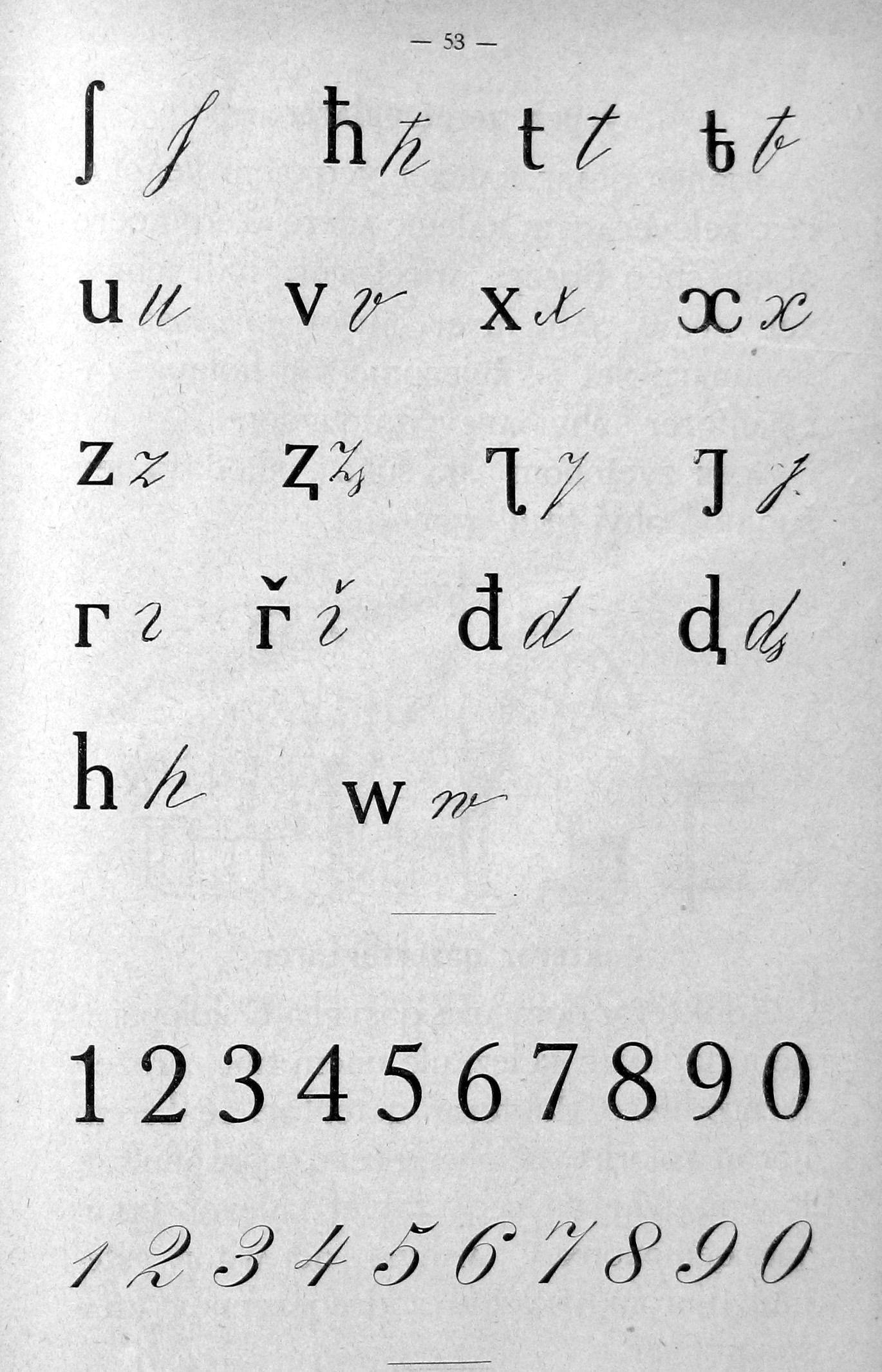
Adyghe Latin alphabet of 1927 (page 2)

== Computing codes ==
Epigraphic reversed F can be represented with the following Unicode (Latin Extended-D) characters, the lowercase however is not supported by Unicode.

Character information
Preview	ꟻ	
Unicode name	LATIN EPIGRAPHIC LETTER REVERSED F	
Encodings	decimal	hex
Unicode	43003	U+A7FB
UTF-8	234 159 187	EA 9F BB
Numeric character reference	&#43003;	&#xA7FB;

== See also ==
- F
- Latinisation in the Soviet Union

== Bibliography ==
- Cagnat, René (1898). Cours d’épigraphie latine. Paris: Fontemoing.
- Hübner, Emil (1885). Exempla Scripturae Epigraphicae Latinae (in Latin). Berlin.
- Joomagueldinov, Nurlan; Pentzlin, Karl; Yevlampiev, Ilya (18 October 2011). Proposal to encode Latin letters used in the Former Soviet Union (PDF).
- Joomagueldinov, Nurlan; Pentzlin, Karl; Yevlampiev, Ilya (29 January 2012). Revised proposal to encode Latin letters used in the Former Soviet Union (PDF).
- Perry, David J. (2006). Proposal to Add Additional Ancient Roman Characters to UCS (PDF).
