= R =

18th letter of the Latin alphabet

- R r

Usage
- Writing system: Latin script
- Type: Alphabetic
- Language of origin: Latin language
- Sound values: [r]; [ɾ]; [ɹ]; [ɻ]; [ɺ]; [l]; [ʀ]; [ʁ]; [ɽ]; [ʐ]; [ʕ]; [ə]; [ɐ]; [ɛ]; [ɑ]; [ɒ]; [o]; (table); (English variations)
- In Unicode: U+0052, U+0072
- Alphabetical position: 18

History
Development
D1
    - Ρ ρ
      - 𐌓
              - R r
- Time period: c. 50 CE to present
- Descendants: ℟; ℞; ®; Ɍ; ᚱ; 𐍂; Ꭱ
- Sisters: Р; ר; ر; ܪ; ࠓ; 𐎗; 𐡓; ረ; Ռ; ռ; Ր; ր; ર; र

Other
- Associated graphs: r(x); rh
- Writing direction: Left-to-right

R (minuscule: r) is the eighteenth letter of the Latin alphabet, used in the modern English alphabet, the alphabets of other western European languages and others worldwide. Its name in English is ar (pronounced /ˈɑːr/), plural ars.

The letter ⟨r⟩ is the eighth most common letter in English and the fourth-most common consonant, after ⟨t⟩, ⟨n⟩, and ⟨s⟩.

== Name ==
The name of the letter in Latin was er (/ɛr/), following the pattern of other letters representing continuants, such as ⟨F⟩, ⟨L⟩, ⟨M⟩, ⟨N⟩, and ⟨S⟩. This name is preserved in French and many other languages. In Middle English, the name of the letter changed from /ɛr/ to /ar/, following a pattern exhibited in many other words such as farm (compare French ferme) and star (compare German Stern).

In Hiberno-English, the letter is called /ɒr/ or /ɔːr/, somewhat similar to oar, ore, orr.

The letter ⟨R⟩ is sometimes referred to as the littera canīna 'canine letter', often rendered in English as the dog's letter. This Latin term referred to the Latin ⟨R⟩ that was trilled to sound like a growling dog, a spoken style referred to as vōx canīna 'dog voice' (e.g. in Spanish perro 'dog').

== History ==
Egyptian	Proto-Sinaitic	Phoenician Resh	Western Greek Rho	Etruscan R	Latin R
D1					

=== Antiquity ===
The word prognatus as written on the Sarcophagus of Lucius Cornelius Scipio Barbatus (280 BC) reveals the full development of the Latin ⟨R⟩ by that time; the letter ⟨P⟩ at the same time still retains its archaic shape distinguishing it from Greek or Old Italic rho.

The letter ⟨R⟩ is believed to derive ultimately from an image of a head, used in Semitic alphabets for the sound /r/ because the word for 'head' was rêš or similar in most Semitic languages. The word became the name of the letter, as an example of acrophony.

It developed into Greek ⟨Ρ⟩ ῥῶ (rhô) and Latin ⟨R⟩. The descending diagonal stroke develops as a graphic variant in some Western Greek alphabets (writing rho as ⟨⟩), but it was not adopted in most Old Italic alphabets; most Old Italic alphabets show variants of their rho between a ⟨P⟩ and a ⟨D⟩ shape, but without the Western Greek descending stroke. Indeed, the oldest known forms of the Latin alphabet itself of the 7th to 6th centuries BC, in the Duenos and the Forum inscription, still write ⟨r⟩ using the ⟨P⟩ shape of the letter. The Lapis Satricanus inscription shows the form of the Latin alphabet around 500 BC. Here, the rounded, closing ⟨Π⟩ shape of the ⟨p⟩ and the ⟨Ρ⟩ shape of the ⟨r⟩ have become difficult to distinguish. The descending stroke of the Latin letter ⟨R⟩ has fully developed by the 3rd century BC, as seen in the Tomb of the Scipios sarcophagus inscriptions of that era. From c. 50 AD, the letter ⟨P⟩ would be written with its loop fully closed, assuming the shape formerly taken by ⟨R⟩.

=== Cursive ===
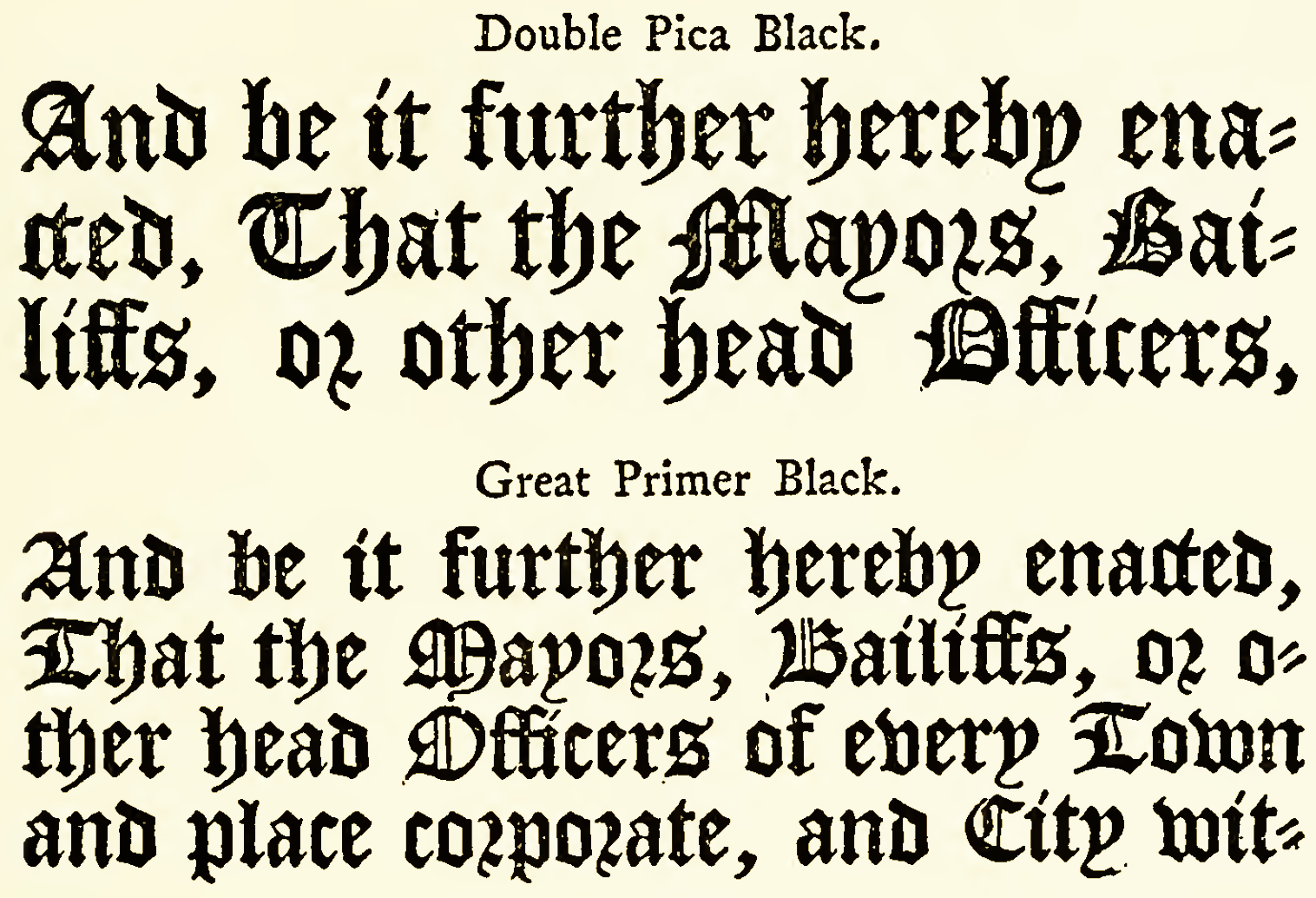
18th-century example of use of r rotunda in English blackletter typography

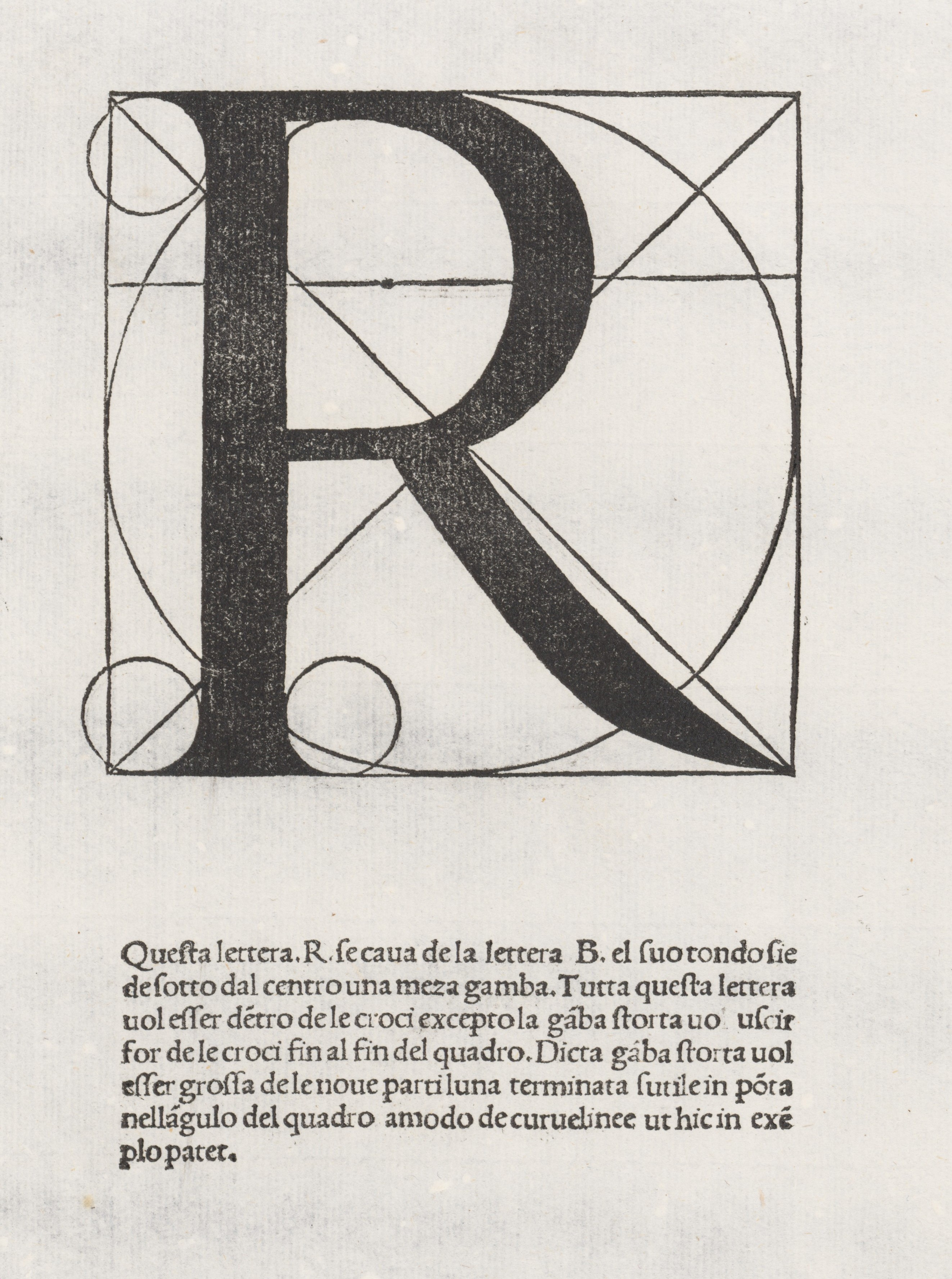
Letter ⟨R⟩ from the alphabet by Luca Pacioli, in De divina proportione (1509)

The minuscule form ⟨r⟩ developed through several variations on the capital form. Along with Latin minuscule writing in general, it developed ultimately from Roman cursive via the uncial script of Late Antiquity into the Carolingian minuscule of the 9th century.

In handwriting, it was common not to close the bottom of the loop but continue into the leg, saving an extra pen stroke. The loop-leg stroke shortened into the simple arc used in the Carolingian minuscule and until today.

A calligraphic minuscule ⟨r⟩, known as r rotunda ⟨ꝛ⟩, was used in the sequence ⟨or⟩, bending the shape of the ⟨r⟩ to accommodate the bulge of the ⟨o⟩ as in ⟨oꝛ⟩, as opposed to ⟨or⟩. Later, the same variant was also used where ⟨r⟩ followed other lower case letters with a rounded loop towards the right, such as with ⟨b⟩, ⟨h⟩, ⟨p⟩, as well as to write the geminate ⟨rr⟩ as ⟨ꝛꝛ⟩. Use of r rotunda was mostly tied to blackletter typefaces, and the glyph fell out of use along with blackletter fonts in English language contexts mostly by the 18th century.

Insular script used a minuscule which retained two downward strokes, but which did not close the loop, known as the Insular r ⟨ꞃ⟩; this variant survives in the Gaelic type popular in Ireland until the mid-20th century, but has become largely limited to a decorative function.

== Use in writing systems ==
Pronunciation of ⟨r⟩ by language
Orthography	Pronunciation
Albanian	/ɾ/
Arabic romanization	/r/ or /ʀ/ or /ɾ/
Aragonese	/ɾ/, /r/
Asturian	/ɾ/, /r/
Basque	/ɾ/, /r/
Catalan	[ɾ], [r], [∅]
Standard Chinese (Pinyin)	/ɻ/
Danish	[ʁ], [ɐ̯], [ɐ]
Dutch	[ɾ], [ʀ], [ʁ], [ɻ], [ə̯], rarely [r]
English	/ɹ/
Esperanto	/ɾ/
Faroese	/ɹ/
French	[ʁ], [ʀ], [∅]
Galician	/ɾ/
German	[ʀ], [ɐ̯], [r]
Gutnish	/ɻ/
Haitian	/ɣ/
Hebrew romanization	/ʁ/
Hopi	/ʐ/
Indonesian	/r/
Irish	/ɾˠ/, /ɾʲ/
Italian	/r/
Japanese (Hepburn)	/ɾ/
Leonese	/ɾ/
Malay	/r/
Manx	/r/
Māori	/ɾ/
Norwegian	[ɾ], [ʁ], [∅]
Portuguese	/ɾ/ or /ʁ/
Scottish Gaelic	/ɾ/, /ɾʲ/
Sicilian	/ɹ/
Spanish	/ɾ/, /r/
Swedish	[ɾ], [ʁ], [∅]
Turkish	/ɾ/
Venetian	/r/
Vietnamese	/z/ or /r/

=== English ===
⟨R⟩ represents a rhotic consonant in English, such as the alveolar approximant (most varieties), alveolar trill (some British varieties), or the retroflex approximant (some varieties in the United States, South West England and Dublin).

In non-rhotic accents, it is not pronounced in certain positions, but can affect the pronunciation of the vowel that precedes it.

R is the ninth most frequently used letter in the English language.

=== Other languages ===
⟨R⟩ represents a rhotic consonant in many languages, as shown in the table below.

Alveolar trill [r]	Most languages such as Estonian, Finnish, Galician, German in some dialects, Hungarian, Icelandic, Indonesian, Italian, Czech, Javanese, Lithuanian, Latvian, Latin, Norwegian mostly in the northwest, Polish, Portuguese (traditional form), Romanian, Russian, Scots, Slovak, Swedish more frequent in northern and western dialects, as well as in Finland Swedish; Sundanese, Ukrainian, Welsh; also Catalan, Spanish and Albanian ⟨rr⟩
Alveolar approximant [ɹ]	Dutch in some Netherlandic dialects (in specific positions of words), Faroese, Sicilian and Swedish, especially when in weakly articulated positions, such as word-final
Alveolar flap / Alveolar tap [ɾ]	Portuguese, Catalan, Spanish and Albanian ⟨r⟩; Turkish, Standard Dutch, Italian, Venetian, Galician, Leonese, Norwegian, Irish, Swedish and Māori
Voiced retroflex fricative [ʐ]	Norwegian around Tromsø; Spanish used as an allophone of /r/ in some South American accents; Swedish especially in Central Swedish dialects, such as the dialect in/around Stockholm; Hopi used before vowels, as in raana, "toad", from Spanish rana
Retroflex approximant [ɻ]	Gutnish; Hanyu Pinyin transliteration of Standard Chinese
Retroflex flap [ɽ]	Norwegian when followed by ⟨d⟩; Scottish English on occasion; Swedish when followed by ⟨d⟩
Uvular trill [ʀ]	German stage standard; some Dutch dialects (in Brabant and Limburg, and some city dialects in the Netherlands); Swedish in southern Sweden; Norwegian in western and southern parts; Venetian only in the Venice area.
Voiced uvular fricative [ʁ]	North Mesopotamian Arabic, Judeo-Iraqi Arabic, German, Danish, French, standard European Portuguese ⟨rr⟩, standard Brazilian Portuguese ⟨rr⟩, Puerto Rican Spanish ⟨rr⟩ and 'r-' in western parts; Norwegian in western and southern parts; Swedish in southern dialects

Other languages may use the letter ⟨r⟩ in their alphabets (or Latin transliteration schemes) to represent rhotic consonants different from the alveolar trill. In Haitian Creole, it represents a sound so weak that it is often written interchangeably with ⟨w⟩, e.g. 'Kweyol' for 'Kreyol'.

The doubled ⟨rr⟩ represents a trilled /r/ in Albanian, Aragonese, Asturian, Basque, Catalan and Spanish.

Brazilian Portuguese has a great number of allophones of /ʁ/, such as [χ], [h], [ɦ], [x], [ɣ], [ɹ] and [r]. The latter three ones can be used only in certain contexts ([ɣ] and [r] as ⟨rr⟩; [ɹ] in the syllable coda, as an allophone of /ɾ/ according to the European Portuguese norm and /ʁ/ according to the Brazilian Portuguese norm). Usually at least two of them are present in a single dialect, such as Rio de Janeiro's [ʁ], [χ], [ɦ] and, for a few speakers, [ɣ].

=== Other systems ===
The International Phonetic Alphabet uses several variations of the letter to represent the different rhotic consonants; ⟨r⟩ represents the alveolar trill.

== Other uses ==
- An R rating of the Motion Picture Association film rating system denotes media, such as movies, that are intended for a restricted audience.

== Related characters ==
=== Descendants and related characters in the Latin alphabet ===
- R with diacritics: Ŕ ŕ Ɍ ɍ Ř ř Ŗ ŗ Ṙ ṙ Ȑ ȑ Ȓ ȓ Ṛ ṛ Ṝ ṝ Ṟ ṟ Ꞧ ꞧ Ɽ ɽ R̃ r̃ ᵲ ꭨ ᵳ ᶉ
- International Phonetic Alphabet-specific symbols related to R: 𝼈 ɹ ɺ ɾ ɻ ɽ ʀ ʁ ʶ ˞ ʴ
- IPA superscript letters: 𐞦 𐞧 𐞨 𐞩 𐞪
- Obsolete and nonstandard symbols in the International Phonetic Alphabet: ɼ ɿ
- Uralic Phonetic Alphabet-specific symbols related to R:
  - U+1D19 ᴙ LATIN LETTER SMALL CAPITAL REVERSED R
  - U+1D1A ᴚ LATIN LETTER SMALL CAPITAL TURNED R
  - U+1D3F ᴿ MODIFIER LETTER CAPITAL R
  - U+1D63 ᵣ LATIN SUBSCRIPT SMALL LETTER R
- Teuthonista phonetic transcription-specific symbols related to R:
  - U+AB45 ꭅ LATIN SMALL LETTER STIRRUP R
  - U+AB46 ꭆ LATIN LETTER SMALL CAPITAL R WITH RIGHT LEG
- Anthropos phonetic transcription:
  - U+AB48 ꭈ LATIN SMALL LETTER DOUBLE R
  - U+AB49 ꭉ LATIN SMALL LETTER R WITH CROSSED-TAIL
  - U+AB4A ꭊ LATIN SMALL LETTER DOUBLE R WITH CROSSED-TAIL
- Otto Bremer's phonetic transcription:
  - U+AB47 ꭇ LATIN SMALL LETTER R WITHOUT HANDLE
  - U+AB4B ꭋ LATIN SMALL LETTER SCRIPT R
  - U+AB4C ꭌ LATIN SMALL LETTER SCRIPT R WITH RING
- 𝼨 – ⟨R⟩ with mid-height left hook was used by the British and Foreign Bible Society in the early 20th century for romanization of the Malayalam language.
- ⱹ – A turned ⟨r⟩ with a tail is used in the Swedish Dialect Alphabet
- RFE Phonetic Alphabet-specific symbols related to R:
  - U+1DF57 𝽗 LATIN SMALL LETTER TURNED R WITH MID-HEIGHT LEFT HOOK
  - U+1DFCD 𝿍 MODIFIER LETTER SMALL TURNED R WITH MID-HEIGHT LEFT HOOK
- 𝽡 – An ⟨r⟩ with left tie was used in the 1960s and 1970s for the Initial Teaching Alphabet
- Other variations of R used for phonetic transcription: 𝼕 𝼖 ʳ ʵ

=== Calligraphic variants in the Latin alphabet ===
- Ꝛ ꝛ – R rotunda
- Ꞃ ꞃ – Insular r (Gaelic type)
- ᫍ – Combining Insular r, as used in the Ormulum

=== Ancestors and siblings in other alphabets ===
- 𐤓 – Semitic letter Resh, from which the following letters derive:
  - Ρ ρ – Greek letter Rho, from which the following letters derive:
    - 𐌓 – Old Italic letter R, the ancestor of modern Latin ⟨R⟩
      - ᚱ – Runic letter Raido
    - Р р – Cyrillic letter Er
    - 𐍂 – Gothic letter Reda
- D21 mouth, uniliteral R, possibly ancestral to Proto-Sinaitic Pe and its descendants.
- ⵔ - Libyco-Berber letter R, from which the Tifinagh letter YAR derive.
- ロ - Katakana letter RO
- 口 - Chinese mouth, from which the Japanese kanji derive.

=== Abbreviations, signs and symbols ===
- ℟ – symbol for response in liturgy
- ℞ – Medical prescription
- ℞ꝵ (ꝶ, Ꝝꝝ) - Medievalist abbreviation for affixes -rum, -rom, re-
- ® – Registered trademark symbol
- ₹ – Indian rupee sign
- ◌͛ ( ͛ ) - Medievalist contraction mark for ꝛ, er, ir

== Other representations ==
=== Computing ===
- U+0052 R LATIN CAPITAL LETTER R
- U+0072 r LATIN SMALL LETTER R
- U+FF32 Ｒ FULLWIDTH LATIN CAPITAL LETTER R
- U+FF52 ｒ FULLWIDTH LATIN SMALL LETTER R

There are many precomposed character forms of the letter with various diacritics.

=== Other ===
NATO phonetic	Morse code
Romeo	▄ ▄▄▄ ▄

Signal flag

Flag semaphore
American manual alphabet (ASL fingerspelling)
British manual alphabet (BSL fingerspelling)
Braille dots-1235
Unified English Braille

== See also ==
- Guttural R
