= V =

Twenty-second letter of the Latin alphabet

- V v

Usage
- Writing system: Latin script
- Type: Alphabetic and logographic
- Language of origin: Latin language
- Sound values: [v] [w] [b] [β] [f] [u] [ə] [ə̃] [y] [ʋ] [ɯ] [ɤ]
- In Unicode: U+0056, U+0076
- Alphabetical position: 22

History
Development
G43T3
        - Υ υ
          - 𐌖
            - V v
- Time period: c. 700 BCE to present
- Descendants: • U • W • ∨ • ℣ • Ꮴ • Ꮙ • Ꮩ
- Sisters: F Ѵ У Ў Ұ Ү Ꝩ ו و ܘ וּ וֹ ࠅ 𐎆 𐡅 ወ વ ૂ ુ उ
- Transliterations: Y, U, W

Other
- Associated graphs: v(x)
- Writing direction: Left-to-right

V (minuscule: v) is the twenty-second letter of the Latin alphabet, used in the modern English alphabet, the alphabets of other western European languages and others worldwide. Its name in English is vee (pronounced /ˈviː/), plural vees.

== Name ==
- Catalan: ve [ˈve]; in dialects that merge /v/ and /b/, the letter is called ve baixa [ˈbe ˈbaʃə] (lit. 'low B').
- Czech: vé [ˈvɛː]
- French: vé [ˈve]
- German: Vau [ˈfaʊ]
- Italian: vi [ˈvi] or vu [ˈvu]
- Japanese: ⟨v⟩ is called a variety of names that approximate its English name, most commonly ブイ [bɯi] or [bui]; still, less nativized variants, violating to an extent Japanese phonotactics, such as ヴィー [viː], ヴイ [vɯi] or [vui], and ヴィ [vi], are also used. The phoneme /v/ in Japanese is used properly only in loanwords, where the preference for either /v/ or /b/ depends on many factors; in general, words that are perceived to be in common use tend toward /b/.
- Polish: fał [ˈfaw]; ⟨v⟩ is not used in native vocabulary, where the /v/ sound is instead represented by ⟨w⟩.
- Portuguese: vê [ˈve]
- Spanish: uve [ˈuβe] is recommended by the RAE, but ve [ˈbe] is traditional. If ⟨v⟩ is referred to using the latter, it would have the same pronunciation as the letter ⟨b⟩ (that is, [ˈbe] in pausa or after a nasal consonant and [ˈβe] elsewhere). Thus, further terms are needed to distinguish ve from be, and to that end, ⟨v⟩ has been called ve corta, ve baja, ve pequeña, ve chica and ve labiodental, (Note: lit. 'short B', 'low B', 'small B', 'small B', 'labiodental B', respectively) among others.

== History ==
Proto-Sinaitic	Phoenician Waw	Western Greek Upsilon	Latin V

The letter ⟨v⟩ ultimately comes from the Phoenician letter waw by way of ⟨u⟩.

During the Late Middle Ages, two minuscule glyphs of U developed which were both used for sounds including /u/ and modern /v/. The pointed form ⟨v⟩ was written at the beginning of a word, while a rounded form ⟨u⟩ was used in the middle or end, regardless of sound. So whereas valour and excuse appeared as in modern printing, have and upon were printed as "haue" and "vpon". The first distinction between the letters ⟨v⟩ and ⟨u⟩ is recorded in a Gothic script from 1386, where ⟨v⟩ preceded ⟨u⟩. By the mid-16th century, the ⟨v⟩ form was used to represent the consonant and ⟨u⟩ the vowel sound, giving us the modern letter ⟨v⟩. ⟨u⟩ and ⟨v⟩ were not accepted as distinct letters until many years later. The rounded variant became the modern-day version of ⟨u⟩, and the letter's former pointed form became ⟨v⟩.

== Use in writing systems ==
Pronunciation of ⟨v⟩ by language
Orthography	Phonemes
Catalan	/v/ or /b/
Cherokee romanization	/ə̃/
Standard Chinese (substitute for ⟨ü⟩ in Pinyin)	/y/
Choctaw (substitute for ⟨ʋ⟩)	/ə/
Dutch	/v/ or /f/
English	/v/
Esperanto	/v/
French	/v/
Galician	/b/
German	/f/, /v/
Indonesian	/f/
Italian	/v/
Irish	/w/, /vʲ/
Malay	/v/
Muscogee	/ə/ ~ /a/
Norwegian	/ʋ/
Old Norse	/w/
Portuguese	/v/ or /b/
Spanish	/b/
Turkish	/v/

=== English ===
In English, ⟨v⟩ represents a voiced labiodental fricative.

Special rules of orthography normally apply to the letter ⟨v⟩:

- Traditionally, ⟨v⟩ is not doubled to indicate a short vowel, the way, for example, ⟨p⟩ is doubled to indicate the difference between super and supper. However, that is changing with newly coined words, such as savvy, divvy up and skivvies.
- A word-final /v/ sound (except in of) is normally spelled -⟨ve⟩, regardless of the pronunciation of the vowel before it. This rule does not apply to transliterations of Slavic and Hebrew words, such as Kyiv (Kiev), or to words that started out as abbreviations, such as sov for sovereign.
- The /ʌ/ sound is spelled ⟨o⟩, not ⟨u⟩, before the letter ⟨v⟩. This originated with a mediaeval scribal practice designed to increase legibility by avoiding too many vertical strokes (minims) in a row.

Like ⟨j⟩, ⟨k⟩, ⟨w⟩, ⟨x⟩ and ⟨z⟩, ⟨v⟩ is not used very frequently in English. It is the sixth least frequently used letter in the English language, occurring in roughly 1% of words. ⟨v⟩ is the only letter that cannot be used to form an English two-letter word in the British and Australian versions of the game of Scrabble. It is one of only two letters (the other being ⟨c⟩) that cannot be used this way in the American version. ⟨v⟩ is also the only letter in the English language that is never silent.

=== Romance languages ===
The letter represents /v/ in several Romance languages, but in others it represents the same sound as ⟨b⟩, i.e. /b/, due to a process known as betacism. Betacism occurs in most dialects of Spanish, in some dialects of Catalan and Portuguese, as well as in Aragonese, Asturleonese and Galician.

In Spanish, the phoneme has two main allophones; in most environments, it is pronounced [β̞], but after a pause or a nasal it is typically [b]. See Allophones of /b d g/ in Spanish phonology for a more thorough discussion.

In Corsican, ⟨v⟩ represents [b], [v], [β] or [w], depending on the position in the word and the sentence.

=== Other languages ===
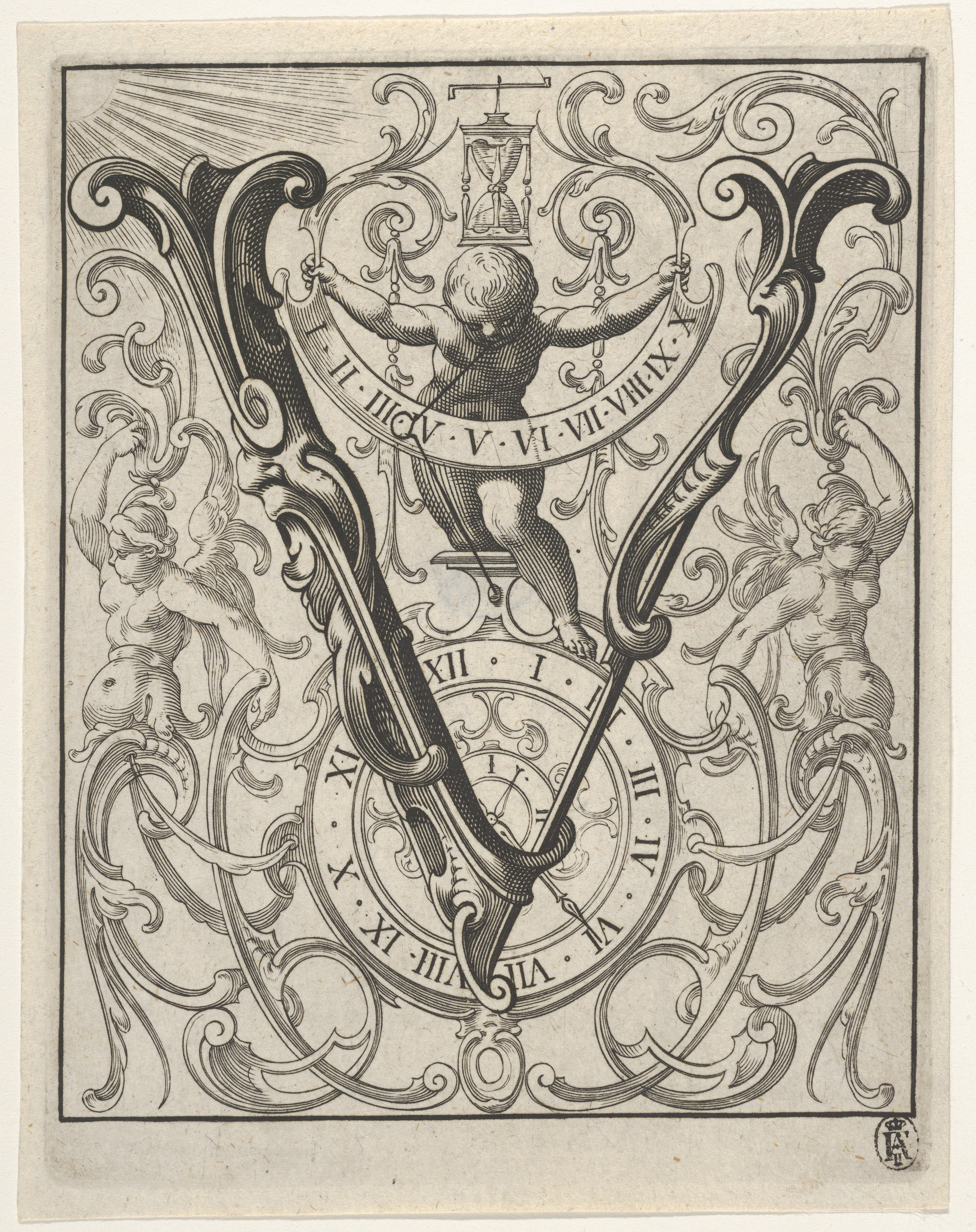
Late Renaissance or early Baroque design of ⟨v⟩, from 1627

In most languages that use the Latin alphabet, ⟨v⟩ represents a voiced bilabial or labiodental sound.

In contemporary German, it represents /v/ in most loanwords, while in native German words, it always represents /f/.

In standard Dutch, it traditionally represents /v/, but in many regions, it represents /f/ in some or all positions.

In the Latinization of the Cherokee syllabary, ⟨v⟩ represents a nasalized schwa, /ə̃/.

In Chinese pinyin, while v is not used, the letter ⟨v⟩ is used by most input methods to enter the letter ⟨ü⟩, which most keyboards lack (romanized-input Chinese is a popular method to enter Chinese text). Informal romanizations of Mandarin Chinese use ⟨v⟩ as a substitute for the close front rounded vowel /y/, properly written ⟨ü⟩ in both pinyin and Wade–Giles.

=== Other systems ===
In the International Phonetic Alphabet, ⟨v⟩ represents the voiced labiodental fricative.

== Other uses ==
- V is used to represent the Roman numeral 5.
- V is the symbol for vanadium. It is number 23 on the periodic table. Emerald derives its green coloring from either vanadium or chromium.
- v, v., and vs can also be used as an abbreviation for the word versus when between two or more competing items (e.g. Brown v. Board of Education).

== Related characters ==
=== Descendants and related letters in the Latin alphabet ===
- U u : Latin letter ⟨u⟩, originally the same letter as ⟨v⟩
- W w : Latin letter ⟨w⟩, descended from ⟨u⟩
- Ỽ ỽ : Middle Welsh ⟨v⟩
- ⟨v⟩ with diacritics: Ṽ ṽ Ṿ ṿ Ʋ ʋ ᶌ
- IPA-specific symbols related to ⟨v⟩: ⱱ ʋ
- ᶹ : Modifier letter small ⟨v⟩ with hook is used in phonetic transcription
- 𐞰 : Modifier letter small ⟨v⟩ with right hook is a superscript IPA letter
- Ʌ ʌ ᶺ: Turned ⟨v⟩
- ⱴ : ⟨v⟩ with curl
- Uralic Phonetic Alphabet-specific symbols related to ⟨v⟩:
  - U+1D20 ᴠ LATIN LETTER SMALL CAPITAL V
  - U+1D5B ᵛ MODIFIER LETTER SMALL V
  - U+1D65 ᵥ LATIN SUBSCRIPT SMALL LETTER V
  - U+2C7D ⱽ MODIFIER LETTER CAPITAL V

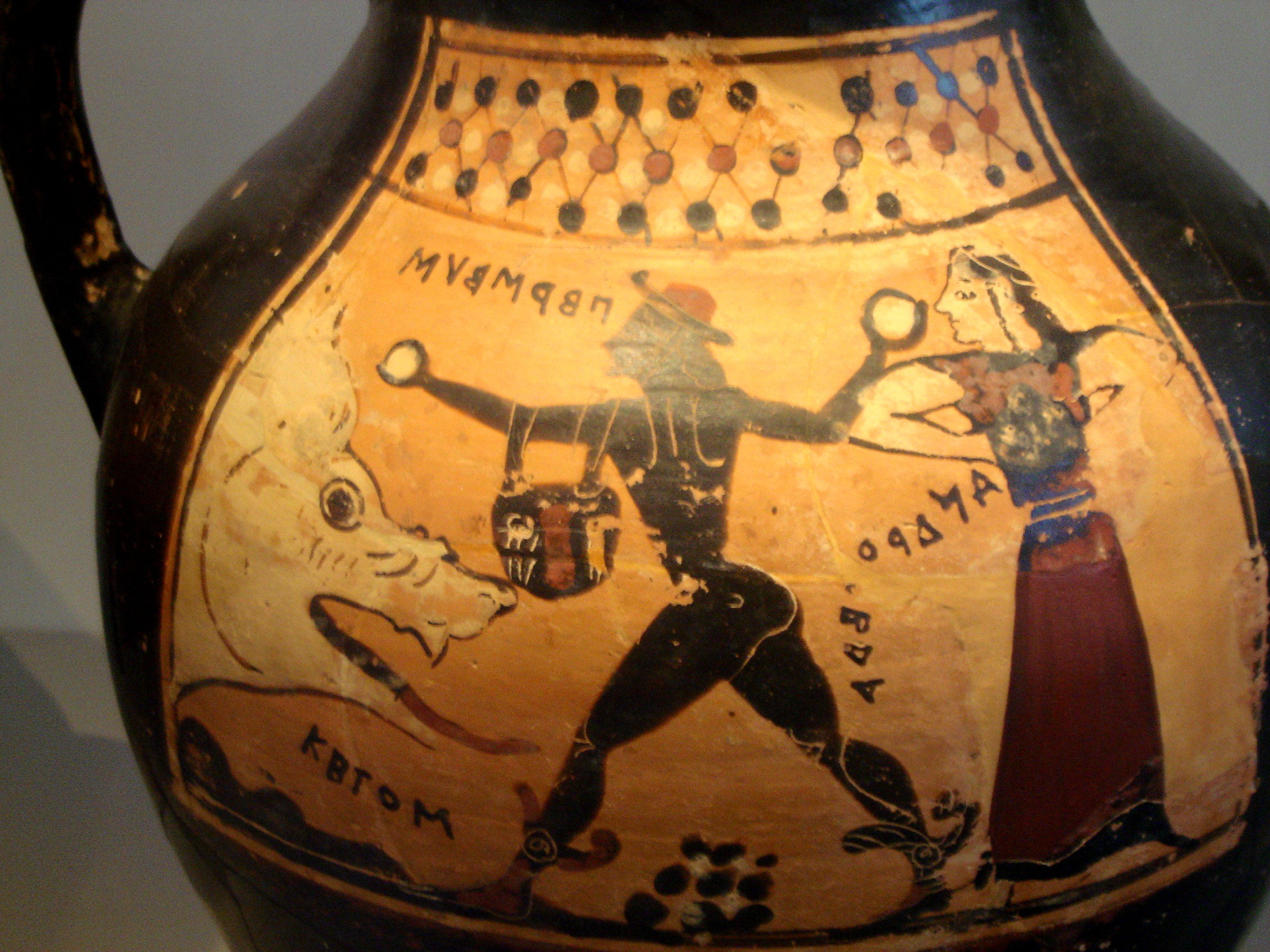
Ancient Corinthian vase depicting Perseus, Andromeda and Ketos. The inscriptions denoting the depicted persons are written in an archaic form of the Greek alphabet. Perseus (classical ΠΕΡΣΕΥΣ) is inscribed as ⟨ϺVBϺΡBΠ⟩ (from right to left), using ⟨V⟩ to represent the vowel [u]. San (⟨Ϻ⟩) is used instead of Sigma (⟨Σ⟩).

=== Ancestors and siblings in other alphabets ===
- 𐤅: Semitic letter Waw, from which the following symbols originally derive:
  - Υ υ : Greek letter Upsilon, from which ⟨v⟩ derives
    - Y y : Latin letter ⟨y⟩, which, like ⟨v⟩, also derives from Upsilon (but was taken into the alphabet at a later date)
    - Ѵ ѵ : Cyrillic letter izhitsa, also descended from Upsilon
    - У у : Cyrillic letter ⟨u⟩, also descended from Upsilon via the digraph of omicron and upsilon
      - Ү ү : Cyrillic letter ⟨Ү⟩, descended from ⟨У⟩ and izhitsa, is used in the scripts for languages in the former Soviet Union and currently the Russian Federation, as well as in Mongolian. Most commonly, it represents /y/ or /ʏ/.

=== Ligatures and abbreviations ===
- ℣ : Versicle sign
- Ꝟ ꝟ : ⟨v⟩ with diagonal stroke, used for medieval scribal abbreviations

== Other representations ==
=== Unicode ===
- U+0056 V LATIN CAPITAL LETTER V
- U+0076 v LATIN SMALL LETTER V
- U+FF36 Ｖ FULLWIDTH LATIN CAPITAL LETTER V
- U+FF56 ｖ FULLWIDTH LATIN SMALL LETTER V

=== Other ===
NATO phonetic	Morse code
Victor	▄ ▄ ▄ ▄▄▄

Signal flag

Flag semaphore
American manual alphabet (ASL fingerspelling)
British manual alphabet (BSL fingerspelling)
Braille dots-1236
Unified English Braille
