= Reversed half H =

Letter of the Latin alphabet

- Ꟶ ꟶ

Usage
- Type: Alphabet
- Language of origin: Latin
- Sound values: [h]
- In Unicode: U+A7F5, U+A7F6
- Alphabetical position: H

History
Development
O6N24V28
          - Η η
            - 𐌇
              - Ꟶ ꟶ
- Time period: Roman Gaul
- Sisters: H Ⱶ
- Transliterations: H

Other
- Associated graphs: C P T
- Writing direction: Left-to-Right

The reversed half H (Ꟶ or ꟶ) was a letter used in Latin inscriptions from Roman Gaul. In French epigraphy works, it is called H dimidiée, "halved H".

== History ==
| Egyptian hieroglyph fence | Proto-Sinaitic ḥaṣr | Phoenician Heth | Greek Heta | Etruscan H | Latin H |
|---|---|---|---|---|---|
| N24 | | | | | |

It is derived from the right part of ⟨H⟩. It represents the aspirate h or rough breathing. It is found at the beginning of words, and following c, p, and t, in words which have an original Greek χ (chi), φ (phi) or θ (theta). It may or may not be related to the characters ⊢ and ⊣ used by Aristophanes of Byzantium to represent the rough breathing and smooth breathing of Greek around 200 BC.

The half H is found in Latin inscriptions of Gaul, particularly the areas of Lugdunum (Lyon) and Nemausus (Nîmes) in modern France. Of the variant forms of H found in inscriptions, the reversed half H is the only one commonly distinguished from the ordinary H in diplomatic transcriptions.

A few authors have considered the reversed half H to be a ligature of H with the preceding letter, but Corpus Inscriptionum Latinarum and catalogues of local inscriptions treat the reversed half H as a distinct letter. There are cases of clear PH, NTH, HI, HE, HR ligatures but, in others, there is visible space between Ꟶ and the previous and following letter.

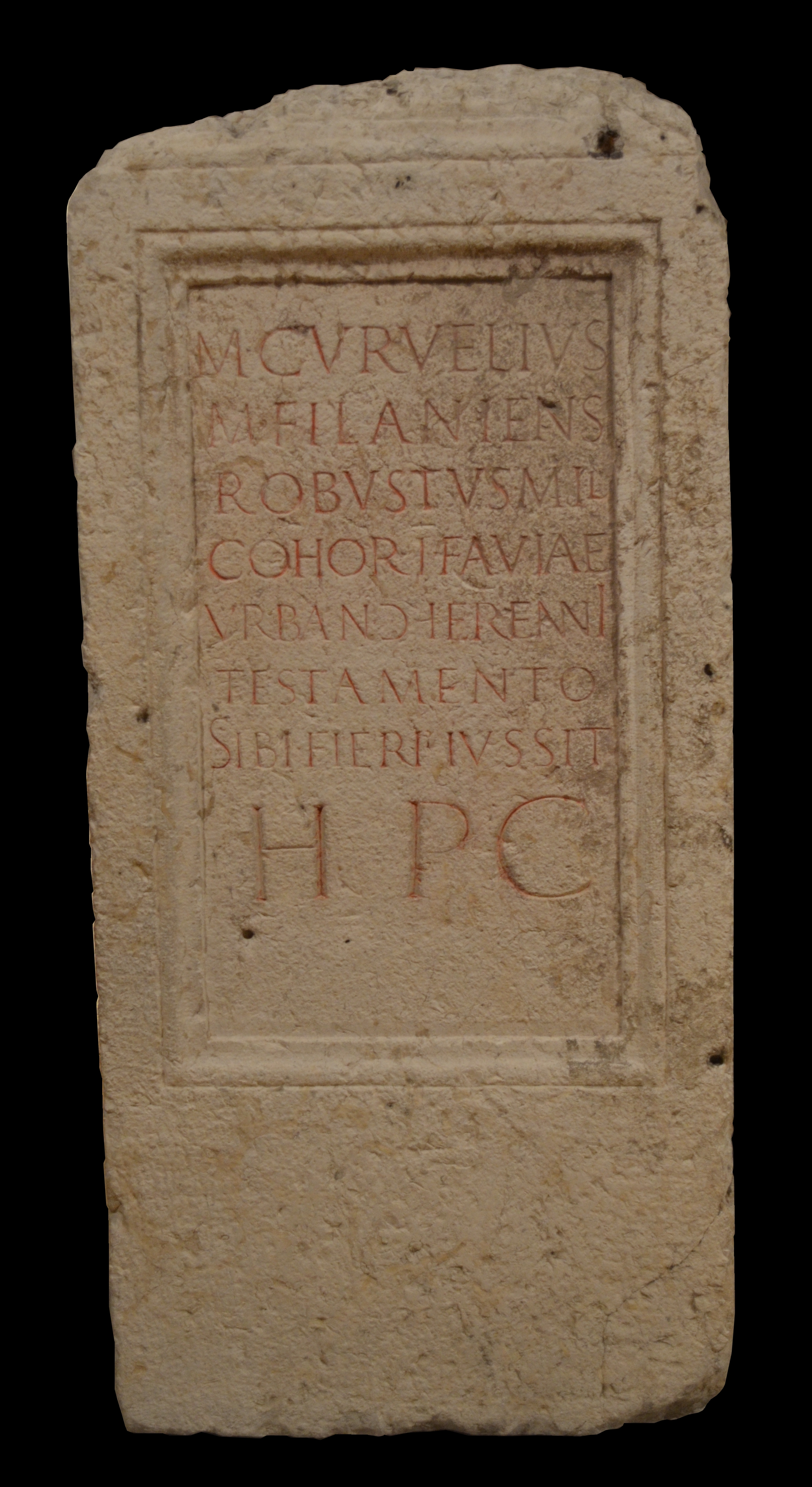
Roman stela with a Latin inscription (CIL XIII 1853) including "C ꟵEREN‍Nꟾ" (c(enturia) Herenni(i), "the centuria of Herennius"); Gallo-Roman Museum of Lyon.

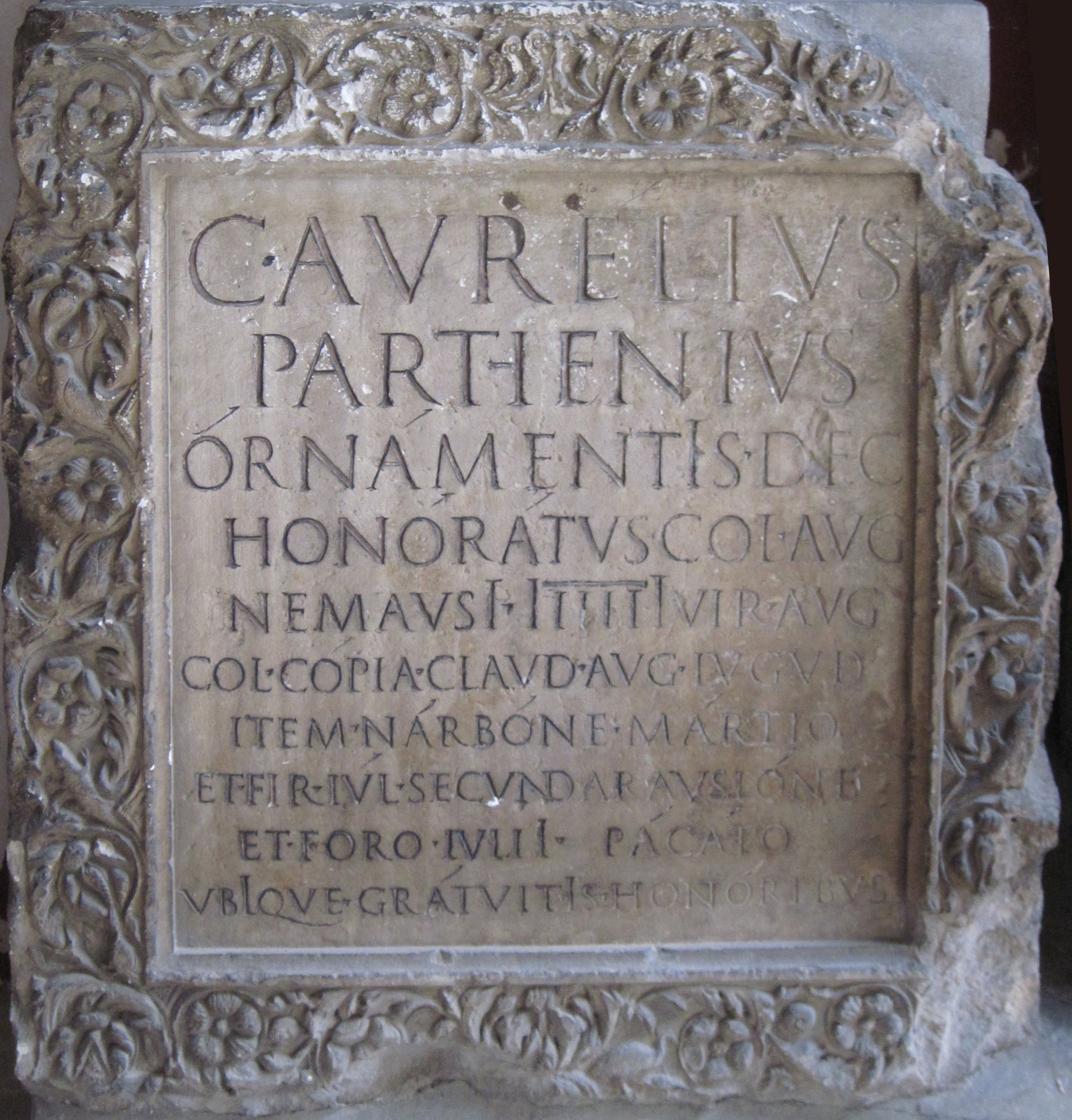
Funeral altar with a Latin inscription (CIL XII 3203) including "PARTꟵENIVS" (Parthenius); Archeological Museum of Nîmes.

== Unicode ==
The letter was introduced in Unicode 13 (March 2020). While the inscriptions show only uppercase forms, a lowercase version has also been entered into Unicode to allow epigraphists to discuss words in appropriate cases. It is named "reversed" to distinguish it from the previously encoded Claudian letter half H ⟨Ⱶ⟩.

Character information
| Preview | Ꟶ | | ꟶ | |
|---|---|---|---|---|
| Unicode name | LATIN CAPITAL LETTER REVERSED HALF H | | LATIN SMALL LETTER REVERSED HALF H | |
| Encodings | decimal | hex | dec | hex |
| Unicode | 42997 | U+A7F5 | 42998 | U+A7F6 |
| UTF-8 | 234 159 181 | EA 9F B5 | 234 159 182 | EA 9F B6 |
| Numeric character reference | &#42997; | &#xA7F5; | &#42998; | &#xA7F6; |

== See also ==
- Half H (Ⱶⱶ)
- Heta (Ͱͱ)
