= Ꞣ =

Latin Letter

K with oblique stroke
- Ꞣ ꞣ

Usage
- Writing system: Latin script
- Type: alphabetic
- Language of origin: Latvian
- Sound values: [c]
- In Unicode: U+A7A2, U+A7A3
- Alphabetical position: 15th

History
Development
D46
      - Κ κ ϰ
        - 𐌊
          - K k
            - Ꞣ ꞣ
- Time period: until 1921
- Transliterations: Ķ

Ꞣ (lowercase ꞣ) is a letter of the Latin script, composed of the letter K with an oblique stroke. It was used in Latvian before 1921, where it was replaced with Ķ.

== Computing codes ==
Character information
Preview	Ꞣ		ꞣ	
Unicode name	LATIN CAPITAL LETTER K WITH OBLIQUE STROKE		LATIN SMALL LETTER K WITH OBLIQUE STROKE	
Encodings	decimal	hex	dec	hex
Unicode	42914	U+A7A2	42915	U+A7A3
UTF-8	234 158 162	EA 9E A2	234 158 163	EA 9E A3
Numeric character reference	&#42914;	&#xA7A2;	&#42915;	&#xA7A3;
