= V with diagonal stroke =

Letter of the Latin alphabet

Latin letter V with stroke and diagonal stroke

V with diagonal stroke (Ꝟ, ꝟ) is a letter of the Latin alphabet, derived from V with the addition of a bar through the left stroke.

== Usage ==
This letter is used in medieval texts as an abbreviation for vir, ver, and vere, as in Latin virgo, a maiden, or Portuguese ver, to see, conversa, conversation, or vereador, member of a town council.

== Computer encodings ==
Capital and small V with diagonal stroke is encoded in Unicode as of version 5.1, at codepoints U+A75E and U+A75F.

== Bibliography ==
- Adriano Cappelli, Lexicon Abbreviaturarum, J. J. Weber, Leipzig (1928).
