= G with oblique stroke =

Letter of the extended Latin alphabet

Latin letter Ꞡ

Ꞡ (lowercase ꞡ) is a letter derived from the Latin alphabet letter G, combined with an oblique bar diacritic. It was used in Latvian orthography before 1921. Karl Faulmann reported in 1880 that the character was used to indicate a "g lind" (i.e., a soft g, the voiced post-alveolar affricate [d͡ʒ]), as opposed to the "hard g" that was denoted by a regular g character.

Character information
Preview	Ꞡ		ꞡ	
Unicode name	LATIN CAPITAL LETTER G WITH OBLIQUE STROKE		LATIN SMALL LETTER G WITH OBLIQUE STROKE	
Encodings	decimal	hex	dec	hex
Unicode	42912	U+A7A0	42913	U+A7A1
UTF-8	234 158 160	EA 9E A0	234 158 161	EA 9E A1
Numeric character reference	&#42912;	&#xA7A0;	&#42913;	&#xA7A1;
