= O with loop =

Latin letter O with loop

Uppercase and lowercase Ꝍ

O with loop (majuscule: Ꝍ, minuscule: ꝍ) is a letter used in a number of Medieval Nordic orthographies including Old Norse, Norwegian, and Icelandic. The letter was used as a scribal abbreviation during the Middle Ages to represent the phonemic /ǫ/, /ø:/, and /ey/.

== Computing codes ==
| Character | Ꝍ | ꝍ |
| Unicode name | LATIN CAPITAL LETTER O WITH LOOP | LATIN SMALL LETTER O WITH LOOP |
| Unicode | A74C | A74D |
| Decimal Code | &#42828; | &#42829; |
| Hex Code | &#xa74d; | &#xa74c; |
