= N with oblique stroke =

Letter of the Latin alphabet

N with oblique stroke - uppercase and lowercase

Ꞥ (lowercase ꞥ) is a letter derived from the combination of the Latin letter N and a stroke diacritic. Until 1921, it was used in Latvian orthography to represent the hard palatal nasal /ɲ/. It was replaced by Ņ (N with a cedilla).

== Computing codes ==
It is represented in Unicode by:

- U+A7A4 Ꞥ LATIN CAPITAL LETTER N WITH OBLIQUE STROKE
- U+A7A5 ꞥ LATIN SMALL LETTER N WITH OBLIQUE STROKE
