= R with oblique stroke =

Letter of the Latin alphabet

- Ꞧ ꞧ

Usage
- Writing system: Latin script
- Type: Alphabetic
- Language of origin: Latvian language

History
- Time period: pre-1921

Ꞧ (lowercase ꞧ) is a letter derived from the Latin alphabet letter R, combined with bar diacritic.

== Usage ==
It was used in Latvian orthography until 1921, to represent palatalized dental trill /rʲ/. In modern orthography, it was replaced with Ŗ (R with a cedilla), which was later became obsolete since 1946.

== Computing codes ==
The forms are represented in Unicode as:

- U+A7A6 Ꞧ LATIN CAPITAL LETTER R WITH OBLIQUE STROKE
- U+A7A7 ꞧ LATIN SMALL LETTER R WITH OBLIQUE STROKE

== See also ==
- Unified Northern Alphabet
