= Sigmoid S =

Middle English variant of the letter S

- Ꟙ ꟙ

Usage
- Writing system: Latin Script
- Type: Alphabet
- In Unicode: U+A7D8, U+A7D9

Sigmoid S (Ꟙ ꟙ) is a letter of the Latin script that was commonly used in Middle English, Middle Scots, and Middle Cornish.

== In Unicode ==
Character information
Preview	Ꟙ		ꟙ	
Unicode name	LATIN CAPITAL LETTER SIGMOID S		LATIN SMALL LETTER SIGMOID S	
Encodings	decimal	hex	dec	hex
Unicode	42968	U+A7D8	42969	U+A7D9
UTF-8	234 159 152	EA 9F 98	234 159 153	EA 9F 99
Numeric character reference	&#42968;	&#xA7D8;	&#42969;	&#xA7D9;
