= DejaVu fonts =

Open-source Unicode fonts

DejaVu
- Category: Serif, Sans (sans-serif), Sans Mono (monospace) variants: Bold, Oblique, Bold Oblique
- Foundry: None
- Date created: 2004
- Date released: 2004
- License: Bitstream Vera Fonts Copyright, Arev Fonts Copyright, Public Domain
- Design based on: Bitstream Vera release 1.10
- Variations: Serif Condensed (Note: Experimental style), Sans Condensed
- Website: dejavu-fonts.github.io
- Latest release version: 2.37
- Latest release date: 30 July 2016

The DejaVu fonts are a superfamily of fonts designed for broad coverage of the Unicode Universal Character Set. The fonts are derived from Bitstream Vera, a font family released by Bitstream under a free license that allowed derivative works based upon them; the Vera family was limited mainly to the characters in the Basic Latin and Latin-1 Supplement portions of Unicode, roughly equivalent to ISO/IEC 8859-15, and Bitstream's licensing terms allowed the fonts to be expanded upon without explicit authorization. The DejaVu fonts project was started with the aim to "provide a wider range of characters ... while maintaining the original look and feel through the process of collaborative development". The development of the fonts is done by many contributors and is organized through a wiki and a mailing list.

The DejaVu fonts project was started by Štěpán Roh. Over time, it has absorbed several other projects that also existed to extend the Bitstream Vera typefaces; these projects include the Olwen Font Family, Bepa, Arev Fonts (only partially), and the SUSE Linux standard fonts. The full project incorporates the Bitstream Vera license, an extended MIT License, which restricts naming of modified distributions and prohibits individual sale of the typefaces, although they may be embedded within a larger commercial software package (terms also found in the later Open Font License); to the extent that the DejaVu fonts' changes can be separated from the original Bitstream Vera and Charter fonts, these changes have been deeded to the public domain.

== Usage ==
DejaVu fonts can be obtained from the DejaVu project repo on GitHub. Some operating systems (OpenBSD, Solaris, Haiku, AmigaOS 4, Linux distributions such as Ubuntu, Debian, Fedora, and RHEL) include DejaVu fonts in their default installation, sometimes even using them as their system fonts. These fonts were also included in the proprietary BlackBerry OS since its version 4.5, under the names "BBAlphaSans" and "BBAlphaSerif", until they were replaced in BlackBerry 10 with Slate.

DejaVu Serif Bold was used by designer Jonathan Barnbrook in the promotional and packaging materials for Blackstar, the final album of English musician David Bowie before his death in January 2016.

DejaVu Serif

DejaVu Sans Mono

DejaVu Sans

== Unicode coverage ==
DejaVu is a project which aims for complete coverage of the alphabetic scripts, abjads, and symbols with all characters that are part of the MES-1, MES-2, and hopefully MES-3 subsets of Unicode. The coverage is already considerable, although some more work is needed to include more hinting rules for clear results at small sizes. Some kerning rules are still being developed for the Sans and Serif styles, for fine typography. Some work is still also needed to create ligatures in these styles.

As of version 2.37, DejaVu Sans included characters from the following Unicode blocks. (The fraction given is the number of characters in each block that is included. DejaVu Serif supports a marginally smaller number of characters.)

=== Plane 0: Basic Multilingual Plane (BMP) Range: 0000-FFFF (0–65,535) ===
| C0 Controls and Basic Latin (95/95) | 100% |
| C1 Controls and Latin-1 Supplement (96/96) | 100% |
| Latin Extended-A (128/128) | 100% |
| Latin Extended-B (208/208) | 100% |
| IPA Extensions (96/96) | 100% |
| Spacing Modifier Letters (80/80) | 79% |
| Combining Diacritical Marks (112/112) | 83% |
| Greek and Coptic (135/135) | 100% |
| Cyrillic (256/256) | 100% |
| Cyrillic Supplement (48/48) | 79% |
| Armenian (91/91) | 96% |
| Hebrew (88/88) | 62% |
| Arabic (255/256) | 64% |
| N'Ko (62/62) | 92% |
| Devanagari (128/128) | 92% |
| Thai (87/87) | 1% |
| Lao (83/83) | 97% |
| Georgian (88/88) | 94% |
| Unified Canadian Aboriginal Syllabics (640/640) | 63% |
| Ogham (29/29) | 100% |
| Combining Diacritical Marks Extended (31/31) | 48% |
| Cyrillic Extended-C (9/11) | 11% |
| Phonetic Extensions (128/128) | 83% |
| Phonetic Extensions Supplement (64/64) | 59% |
| Combining Diacritical Marks Supplement (64/64) | 10% |
| Latin Extended Additional (256/256) | 98% |
| Greek Extended (233/233) | 100% |
| General Punctuation (111/111) | 96% |
| Superscripts and Subscripts (42/42) | 100% |
| Currency Symbols (33/33) | 84% |
| Combining Diacritical Marks for Symbols (33/33) | 21% |
| Letterlike Symbols (80/80) | 94% |
| Number Forms (60/60) | 92% |
| Arrows (112/112) | 100% |
| Mathematical Operators (256/256) | 100% |
| Miscellaneous Technical (256/256) | 53% |
| Control Pictures (39/42) | 5% |
| Enclosed Alphanumerics (160/160) | 6% |
| Box Drawing (128/128) | 100% |
| Block Elements (32/32) | 100% |
| Geometric Shapes (96/96) | 100% |
| Miscellaneous Symbols (256/256) | 74% |
| Dingbats (192/192) | 91% |
| Miscellaneous Mathematical Symbols-A (48/48) | 19% |
| Supplemental Arrows-A (16/16) | 100% |
| Braille Patterns (256/256) | 100% |
| Supplemental Arrows-B (128/128) | 100% |
| Miscellaneous Mathematical Symbols-B (128/128) | 10% |
| Supplemental Mathematical Operators (256/256) | 29% |
| Miscellaneous Symbols and Arrows (253/253) | 17% |
| Latin Extended-C (32/32) | 96% |
| Georgian Supplement (40/40) | 95% |
| Tifinagh (59/59) | 93% |
| Cyrillic Extended-A (32/32) | 34% |
| Supplemental Punctuation (94/94) | 10% |
| Yijing Hexagram Symbols (64/64) | 100% |
| Lisu (48/48) | 100% |
| Cyrillic Extended-B (96/96) | 34% |
| Modifier Tone Letters (32/32) | 62% |
| Latin Extended-D (193/199) | 48% |
| Latin Extended-E (60/60) | 48% |
| Alphabetic Presentation Forms (58/58) | 100% |
| Arabic Presentation Forms-A (611/611) | 18% |
| Variation Selectors (16/16) | 100% |
| Combining Half Marks (16/16) | 25% |
| Arabic Presentation Forms-B (141/141) | 100% |
| Specials (5/5) | 100% |
=== Plane 1: Supplementary Multilingual Plane (SMP) Range: 10000-1FFFF (65,536–131,071) ===
| Old Italic (36/36) | 97% |
| Latin Extended-F (57/57) | 48% |
| Tai Xuan Jing Symbols (87/87) | 100% |
| Mathematical Alphanumeric Symbols (996/996) | 12% |
| Latin Extended-G (37/37) | 48% |
| Cyrillic Extended-D (63/63) | 48% |
| Arabic Mathematical Alphabetic Symbols (143/143) | 52% |
| Domino Tiles (100/100) | 100% |
| Playing Cards (82/82) | 72% |
| Miscellaneous Symbols and Pictographs (768/768) | 2% |
| Emoticons (80/80) | 80% |

== Styles ==
The 10 styles provided by the original Bitstream Vera fonts have been augmented to 21 styles:

| DejaVu Sans | DejaVu Serif | DejaVu Sans Mono |
|---|---|---|
| **Book / Oblique** | **Book** / Italic | **Book / Oblique** |
| **Bold / Oblique** | **Bold** / Italic | **Bold / Oblique** |
| Extralight | | |
| Condensed / Oblique | Condensed / Italic | |
| Condensed Bold / Oblique | Condensed Bold / Italic | |

Original styles are marked in bold.

== DejaVu Sans Mono ==
The DejaVu Sans Mono typeface in particular is suitable for technical contexts, since it clearly distinguishes "l" (lowercase L) from "1" (one) and from "I" (uppercase i); also it clearly distinguishes "0" (zero, null) from "O" (uppercase o).

One derivative of the DejaVu Sans Mono typeface, the Menlo typeface, is provided by Apple with the Mac OS X 10.6 operating system. Another is the Hack typeface, which seeks to further-optimize DejaVu Sans Mono for programming, and which is as of 2023 the default monospace font for KDE on openSUSE.

== Stylistic alternates ==
Variants of the letters ⟨Đ đ⟩, ⟨Ǥ ǥ⟩, ⟨Ŋ⟩, ⟨Ʒ⟩ available in DejaVu Serif

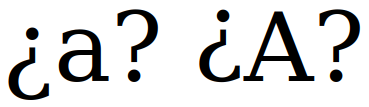
'Case sensitive' character variants of the Spanish question marks

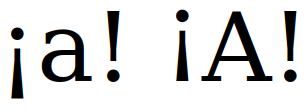
'Case sensitive' character variants of the Spanish exclamation marks

DejaVu fonts support a limited number of character and stylistic variants. DejaVu Serif supports small capitals of Latin and Greek, case-sensitive forms of the Spanish punctuation marks ¿, ¡ (and ⸘), single- and double-loop 'g', and glyph variants of the letters ⟨Đ đ⟩, ⟨Ǥ ǥ⟩, ⟨Ŋ⟩ and ⟨Ʒ⟩.

== See also ==
- List of typefaces
- Unicode font
- Open-source Unicode typefaces
