= Unicode subscripts and superscripts =

Unicode denominator & numerator glyphs

Unicode has subscripted and superscripted versions of a number of characters including a full set of Arabic numerals. These characters allow any polynomial, chemical and certain other equations to be represented in plain text without using any form of markup like HTML or TeX.

The World Wide Web Consortium and the Unicode Consortium have made recommendations on the choice between using markup and using superscript and subscript characters:

When used in mathematical context (MathML) it is recommended to consistently use style markup for superscripts and subscripts [...] However, when super and sub-scripts are to reflect semantic distinctions, it is easier to work with these meanings encoded in text rather than markup, for example, in phonetic or phonemic transcription.

== Uses ==
The difference between superscript/subscript and numerator/denominator glyphs. In many popular computer fonts the Unicode "superscript" and "subscript" characters are actually numerator and denominator glyphs.

The intended use when these characters were added to Unicode was to produce true superscripts and subscripts so that chemical and algebraic formulas could be written without markup. Thus H₂O (using a subscript 2 character) is supposed to be identical to H_{2}O (with subscript markup).

In reality, many fonts that include these characters ignore the Unicode definition, and instead design the digits for mathematical numerator and denominator glyphs, which are aligned with the cap line and the baseline, respectively. When used with the solidus or the fraction slash, they produce an almost typographically correct diagonal fraction, such as ³/₄ for the ¾ glyph. Super and subscript markup does not produce a correct fraction (compare markup ^{3}/_{4} or ^{3}/_{4} with precomposed ¾). The change also makes the superscript letters useful for ordinal indicators, more closely matching the ª and º characters.

Unicode intended that diagonal fractions be rendered by a different mechanism: the Unicode fraction slash U+2044 is visually similar to the solidus, but when used with the ordinary digits (not the superscripts and subscripts), it instructs the layout system that a fraction such as ¾ is to be rendered using automatic glyph substitution. (Note: For a general overview and technical information on glyph substitution (though not specifically for fractions), see GSUB — Glyph Substitution Table in the OpenType specification on the Microsoft Typography site.) User-end support was quite poor for a number of years, but fonts, (Note: Such as Andika, Arno Pro, Brill, Brioso Pro, Calibri, Candara, Carlito, Cantarell, FiraGO, EB Garamond, Gentium, Lato, Linux Libertine, Noto Sans, Noto Serif, Open Sans and Yrsa) browsers, (Note: Such as Chrome, Firefox and Falkon) word processors, (Note: Such as LibreOffice Writer) desktop publishing software (Note: Such as Adobe InDesign and Scribus) and others increasingly support the intended Unicode behavior. The browser on which this page is rendered and its default font render the sequence as 3/4.

== Superscripts and subscripts block ==
The most common superscript digits (1, 2, and 3) were included in ISO-8859-1 and were therefore carried over into those code points in the Latin-1 range of Unicode. The remainder were placed along with basic arithmetical symbols, and later some Latin subscripts, in a dedicated block at U+2070 to U+209F. The table below shows these characters together. Each superscript or subscript character is preceded by a baseline x to show the height of subscripting/superscripting.

Two code points in the "Superscripts and Subscripts" block are unassigned, and remain available for future characters.

Unicode characters
	0	1	2	3	4	5	6	7	8	9	A	B	C	D	E	F
U+00Bx			x²	x³						x¹						
U+207x	x⁰	xⁱ			x⁴	x⁵	x⁶	x⁷	x⁸	x⁹	x⁺	x⁻	x⁼	x⁽	x⁾	xⁿ
U+208x	x₀	x₁	x₂	x₃	x₄	x₅	x₆	x₇	x₈	x₉	x₊	x₋	x₌	x₍	x₎	
U+209x	xₐ	xₑ	xₒ	xₓ	xₔ	xₕ	xₖ	xₗ	xₘ	xₙ	xₚ	xₛ	xₜ	x₝	x₞	x₟

Not yet assigned
Other characters from Latin-1 not related to super- or sub-scripts

== Other superscript and subscript characters ==
Unicode also includes codepoints for subscript and superscript characters that are intended for semantic usage, in the following blocks:

Superscript

- The Latin-1 Supplement block contains the feminine and masculine ordinal indicators ª and º.
- The Latin Extended-C block contains one superscript, ⱽ.
- The Latin Extended-D block contains seven superscripts: ꝰ ꟲ ꟳ ꟴ ꟱ ꟸ ꟹ.
- The Latin Extended-E block contains five superscripts: ꭜ ꭝ ꭞ ꭟ ꭩ.
- The Latin Extended-F block is entirely superscript IPA letters: 𐞁 𐞂 𐞃 𐞄 𐞅 𐞇 𐞈 𐞉 𐞊 𐞋 𐞌 𐞍 𐞎 𐞏 𐞐 𐞑 𐞒 𐞓 𐞔 𐞕 𐞖 𐞗 𐞘 𐞙 𐞚 𐞛 𐞜 𐞝 𐞞 𐞟 𐞠 𐞡 𐞢 𐞣 𐞤 𐞥 𐞦 𐞧 𐞨 𐞩 𐞪 𐞫 𐞬 𐞭 𐞮 𐞯 𐞰 𐞲 𐞳 𐞴 𐞵 𐞶 𐞷 𐞸 𐞹 𐞺 𐞻 𐞼 𐞽 𐞾 𐞿.
- The Latin Extended-G block contains many superscripts: 𝿍 𝿎 𝿏 𝿑 𝿒 𝿓 𝿔 𝿕 𝿖 𝿗 𝿘 𝿙 𝿚 𝿛 𝿜 𝿝 𝿞 𝿟 𝿠 𝿡 𝿢 𝿣 𝿤 𝿥 𝿦 𝿧 𝿨 𝿩 𝿪 𝿫 𝿬 𝿭 𝿮 𝿯 𝿰 𝿱 𝿲 𝿳 𝿴 𝿵 𝿶 𝿷 𝿸 𝿹 𝿺 𝿻 𝿼 𝿽 𝿾 𝿿
- The Spacing Modifier Letters block has superscripted letters and symbols used for phonetic transcription: ʰ ʱ ʲ ʳ ʴ ʵ ʶ ʷ ʸ ˀ ˁ ˠ ˡ ˢ ˣ ˤ.
- The Phonetic Extensions block has several superscripted letters and symbols: Latin/IPA ᴬ ᴭ ᴮ ᴯ ᴰ ᴱ ᴲ ᴳ ᴴ ᴵ ᴶ ᴷ ᴸ ᴹ ᴺ ᴻ ᴼ ᴽ ᴾ ᴿ ᵀ ᵁ ᵂ ᵃ ᵄ ᵅ ᵆ ᵇ ᵈ ᵉ ᵊ ᵋ ᵌ ᵍ ᵏ ᵐ ᵑ ᵒ ᵓ ᵖ ᵗ ᵘ ᵚ ᵛ, Greek ᵝ ᵞ ᵟ ᵠ ᵡ, Cyrillic ᵸ, other ᵎ ᵔ ᵕ ᵙ ᵜ. These are intended to indicate secondary articulation.
- The Phonetic Extensions Supplement block has several more: Latin/IPA ᶛ ᶜ ᶝ ᶞ ᶟ ᶠ ᶡ ᶢ ᶣ ᶤ ᶥ ᶦ ᶧ ᶨ ᶩ ᶪ ᶫ ᶬ ᶭ ᶮ ᶯ ᶰ ᶱ ᶲ ᶳ ᶴ ᶵ ᶶ ᶷ ᶸ ᶹ ᶺ ᶻ ᶼ ᶽ ᶾ, Greek ᶿ.
- The Cyrillic Extended-B block contains two Cyrillic superscripts: ꚜ ꚝ.
- The Cyrillic Extended-D block contains many Cyrillic superscripts: 𞀰 𞀱 𞀲 𞀳 𞀷 𞀵 𞀶 𞀷 𞀸 𞀹 𞀺 𞀻 𞀼 𞀽 𞀾 𞀿 𞁀 𞁁 𞁂 𞁃 𞁄 𞁅 𞁆 𞁇 𞁈 𞁉 𞁊 𞁋 𞁌 𞁍 𞁎 𞁏 𞁐 𞁫 𞁬 𞁭.
- The Georgian block contains one superscripted Mkhedruli letter: ჼ.
- The Kanbun block has superscripted annotation characters used in Japanese copies of Classical Chinese texts: ㆒ ㆓ ㆔ ㆕ ㆖ ㆗ ㆘ ㆙ ㆚ ㆛ ㆜ ㆝ ㆞ ㆟.
- The Tifinagh block has one superscript letter : ⵯ.
- The Unified Canadian Aboriginal Syllabics and its Extended blocks contain several mostly consonant-only letters to indicate syllable coda called Finals, along with some characters that indicate syllable medial known as Medials: Main block ᐜ ᐝ ᐞ ᐟ ᐠ ᐡ ᐢ ᐣ ᐤ ᐥ ᐦ ᐧ ᐨ ᐩ ᐪ ᑉ ᑊ ᑋ ᒃ ᒄ ᒡ ᒢ ᒻ ᒼ ᒽ ᒾ ᓐ ᓑ ᓒ ᓪ ᓫ ᔅ ᔆ ᔇ ᔈ ᔉ ᔊ ᔋ ᔥ ᔾ ᔿ ᕀ ᕁ ᕐ ᕑ ᕝ ᕪ ᕻ ᕯ ᕽ ᖅ ᖕ ᖖ ᖟ ᖦ ᖮ ᗮ ᘁ ᙆ ᙇ ᙚ ᙾ ᙿ; Extended block: ᣔ ᣕ ᣖ ᣗ ᣘ ᣙ ᣚ ᣛ ᣜ ᣝ ᣞ ᣟ ᣳ ᣴ ᣵ.
- The Armenian block contains three superscripted letters: ՘ ֋ ֌.

Combining superscript

- The Combining Diacritical Marks block contains medieval superscript letter diacritics. These letters are written directly above other letters appearing in medieval Germanic manuscripts, and so these glyphs do not include spacing, for example uͤ. They are shown here over the dotted circle placeholder ◌: ◌ͣ ◌ͤ ◌ͥ ◌ͦ ◌ͧ ◌ͨ ◌ͩ ◌ͪ ◌ͫ ◌ͬ ◌ͭ ◌ͮ ◌ͯ.
- The Combining Diacritical Marks Extended block contains three combining insular letters for the Middle English Ormulum, ◌ᫌ ◌ᫍ ◌ᫎ.
- The Combining Diacritical Marks Supplement block contains additional medieval superscript letter diacritics, enough to complete the basic lowercase Latin alphabet except for j, q and y, a few small capitals and ligatures (ae ao av), and additional letters: ◌᷒ ◌ᷓ ◌ᷔ ◌ᷕ ◌ᷖ ◌ᷗ ◌ᷘ ◌ᷙ ◌ᷚ ◌ᷛ ◌ᷜ ◌ᷝ ◌ᷞ ◌ᷟ ◌ᷠ ◌ᷡ ◌ᷢ ◌ᷣ ◌ᷤ ◌ᷥ ◌ᷦ ◌ᷧ ◌ᷨ ◌ᷪ ◌ᷫ ◌ᷬ ◌ᷭ ◌ᷮ ◌ᷯ ◌ᷰ ◌ᷱ ◌ᷲ ◌ᷳ ◌ᷴ, Greek ◌ᷩ.
- The Cyrillic Extended-A and -B blocks contains multiple medieval superscript letter diacritics, enough to complete the basic lowercase Cyrillic alphabet used in Church Slavonic texts, also includes an additional ligature (ст): ◌ⷠ ◌ⷡ ◌ⷢ ◌ⷣ ◌ⷤ ◌ⷥ ◌ⷦ ◌ⷧ ◌ⷨ ◌ⷩ ◌ⷪ ◌ⷫ ◌ⷬ ◌ⷭ ◌ⷮ ◌ⷯ ◌ⷰ ◌ⷱ ◌ⷲ ◌ⷳ ◌ⷴ ◌ⷵ ◌ⷶ ◌ⷷ ◌ⷸ ◌ⷹ ◌ⷺ ◌ⷻ ◌ⷼ ◌ⷽ ◌ⷾ ◌ⷿ ◌ꙴ ◌ꙵ ◌ꙶ ◌ꙷ ◌ꙸ ◌ꙹ ◌ꙺ ◌ꙻ ◌ꚞ ◌ꚟ.
- The Cyrillic Extended-D block has one additional combining character, that being і: ◌𞂏.

Subscript

- The Latin Extended-C block contains one subscript, ⱼ.
- The Phonetic Extensions block has several subscripted letters and symbols: Latin/IPA ᵢ ᵣ ᵤ ᵥ and Greek ᵦ ᵧ ᵨ ᵩ ᵪ.
- The Cyrillic Extended-D block also contains many Cyrillic subscripts: 𞁑 𞁒 𞁓 𞁔 𞁕 𞁖 𞁗 𞁘 𞁙 𞁚 𞁛 𞁜 𞁝 𞁞 𞁟 𞁠 𞁡 𞁢 𞁣 𞁤 𞁥 𞁦 𞁧 𞁨 𞁩 𞁪.
- The Latin Extended-G block contains one subscript, 𝿐.

Combining subscript

- The Combining Diacritical Marks Supplement block contains a combining subscript: ◌᷊.
- The Combining Diacritical Marks Extended block contains two combining letters for linguistic transcriptions of Scots, ◌ᪿ ◌ᫀ.

== Latin, Greek, Cyrillic, and IPA tables ==
A superscript small-cap W may be distinct from a superscript lowercase w in italic typeface, as in this phonetic notation.

Consolidated, the Unicode standard contains superscript and subscript versions of a subset of Latin, Greek and Cyrillic letters. Here they are arranged in alphabetical order for comparison (or for copy and paste convenience). Since these characters appear in different Unicode ranges, they may not appear to be the same size or position due to font substitution by the browser. Shaded cells mark petite capitals that are not very distinct from minuscules in Roman typeface, but they may be distinct in italic typeface, as is used in some phonetic notation.

Little punctuation is encoded. Parentheses are shown in the basic superscript block above, and the exclamation mark ⟨ꜝ⟩ is shown in the IPA table below. In a supporting font, a question mark may be created with a superscript gelded question mark and a combining dot below: ⟨ˀ̣⟩.

Basic Latin modifier letters
	A	B	C	D	E	F	G	H	I	J	K	L	M	N	O	P	Q	R	S	T	U	V	W	X	Y	Z
Superscript capital	ᴬ	ᴮ	ꟲ	ᴰ	ᴱ	ꟳ	ᴳ	ᴴ	ᴵ	ᴶ	ᴷ	ᴸ	ᴹ	ᴺ	ᴼ	ᴾ	ꟴ	ᴿ	꟱	ᵀ	ᵁ	ⱽ	ᵂ	–	*	–
Superscript small capital	𝿩	𐞄		𝿨	𝿪	–	𐞒	𐞖	ᶦ	–	𞀹^{§}	ᶫ	𞀻^{§}	ᶰ		𝿑	–	𐞪		𞁀^{§}	ᶸ				𐞲	
Superscript minuscule	ᵃ	ᵇ	ᶜ	ᵈ	ᵉ	ᶠ	ᵍ	ʰ	ⁱ	ʲ	ᵏ	ˡ	ᵐ	ⁿ	ᵒ	ᵖ	𐞥	ʳ	ˢ	ᵗ	ᵘ	ᵛ	ʷ	ˣ	ʸ	ᶻ
Overscript small capital	–	◌ⷡ ^{§}		–	–	–	◌ᷛ	◌ⷩ ^{§}	–	–	◌ⷦ ^{§}	◌ᷞ	◌ᷟ	◌ᷡ		–	–	◌ᷢ		◌ⷮ ^{§}	–				–	
Overscript minuscule	◌ͣ	◌ᷨ	◌ͨ	◌ͩ	◌ͤ	◌ᷫ	◌ᷚ	◌ͪ	◌ͥ	–	◌ᷜ	◌ᷝ	◌ͫ	◌ᷠ	◌ͦ	◌ᷮ	–	◌ͬ	◌ᷤ	◌ͭ	◌ͧ	◌ͮ	◌ᷱ	◌ͯ	◌ꙷ ^{§}	◌ᷦ
Subscript minuscule	ₐ	–	𞁞^{§}	–	ₑ	–	–	ₕ	ᵢ	ⱼ	ₖ	ₗ	ₘ	ₙ	ₒ	ₚ	–	ᵣ	ₛ	ₜ	ᵤ	ᵥ	₝	ₓ	₞	₟
Underscript minuscule																		◌᷊					◌ᪿ			

^{§} Cyrillic 𞀹 𞀻 𞁀, ◌ⷡ ◌ⷩ ◌ⷦ ◌ⷮ ◌ꙷ and 𞁞 might be substituted for these letters.

*Superscript capital Y is in the pipeline for a future version of the Unicode Standard.

Additional Latin modifier letters
	Æ	Ä	Ƀ	Ǝ	Ə	Ħ	ꬸ	Ŋ	Ƞ	Ö	Ü	𝽗	𝽘	𝽙
Superscript capital	ᴭ	(ᴬ̈)	ᴯ	ᴲ		ꟸ		ᴻ		(ᴼ̈)	(ᵁ̈)			
Superscript minuscule	𐞃	(ᵃ̈)	𝿒	ᵊ		𐞕		ᵑ	𝿜	(ᵒ̈)	(ᵘ̈)	𝿍	𝿎	𝿏
Overscript minuscule	◌ᷔ	◌ᷲ		◌ᷪ			◌ᷬ			◌ᷳ	◌ᷴ			
Subscript minuscule				ₔ										

Some of these superscript capitals are small caps in the source documents in the Unicode proposals. Superscript Ä, Ö, Ü (in parentheses) are composed of the base letter and a combining tréma.

Except for the iota subscript, which has use in Greek text, the modifier Greek letters are intended as phonetic characters in Latin-script text. Shaded cells are indistinguishable from Latin letters, and so would not be expected to have distinctive use in Latin text or to be supported by Unicode.

Greek modifier letters (intended for use in Latin-script text)
	Α	Β	Γ	Δ	Ε	Ζ	Η	Θ	Ι	Κ	Λ	Μ	Ν	Ξ	Ο	Π	Ρ	Σ	Τ	Υ	Φ	Χ	Ψ	Ω
Superscript minuscule	ᵅ (Note: In some fonts, script-a ᵅ and ᶹ have the form of superscript Greek alpha and upsilon; in others they are not a close match. Similarly with superscript ƞ and Greek eta.)	ᵝ	ᵞ	ᵟ	ᵋ		𝿜	ᶿ	ᶥ											ᶹ	ᵠ	ᵡ	𝿳	𝿴
Overscript minuscule	◌ᷧ	◌ᷩ																						◌᫇ (Note: ⟨◌̫⟩ and ⟨◌᫇⟩ are traditionally typeset as an omega.)
Subscript minuscule		ᵦ	ᵧ						ͺ (Note: ⟨ͺ⟩ is set lower than a normal subscript. It is equivalent to underscript ⟨◌ͅ⟩ on a space.)								ᵨ				ᵩ	ᵪ		
Underscript minuscule									◌ͅ															◌̫

Cyrillic modifier characters are intended for use in Cyrillic text.

Russian modifier letters
	А	Б	В	Г	Д	Е	Ж	З	И	К	Л	М	Н	О	П	Р	С	Т	У	Ф	Х	Ц	Ч	Ш	Щ	Ъ	Ы	Ь	Э	Ю	Я
Superscript	𞀰	𞀱	𞀲	𞀳	𞀴	𞀵	𞀶	𞀷	𞀸	𞀹	𞀺	𞀻	ᵸ	𞀼	𞀽	𞀾	𞀿	𞁀	𞁁	𞁂	𞁃	𞁄	𞁅	𞁆	–	ꚜ	𞁇	ꚝ	𞁈	𞁉	–
Overscript	◌ⷶ	◌ⷠ	◌ⷡ	◌ⷢ	◌ⷣ	◌ⷷ	◌ⷤ	◌ⷥ	◌ꙵ	◌ⷦ	◌ⷧ	◌ⷨ	◌ⷩ	◌ⷪ	◌ⷫ	◌ⷬ	◌ⷭ	◌ⷮ	◌ꙷ	◌ꚞ	◌ⷯ	◌ⷰ	◌ⷱ	◌ⷲ	◌ⷳ	◌ꙸ	◌ꙹ	◌ꙺ	–	◌ⷻ	–
Subscript	𞁑	𞁒	𞁓	𞁔	𞁕	𞁖	𞁗	𞁘	𞁙	𞁚	𞁛	–	–	𞁜	𞁝	–	𞁞	–	𞁟	𞁠	𞁡	𞁢	𞁣	𞁤	–	𞁥	𞁦	–	–	–	–

Additional modern Cyrillic modifier letters
	Ә	Ґ	Є	Ѕ	Ꚉ	І	Ї	Ј	Ө	Ҫ	Ү	Ұ	Џ	Ӏ
Superscript	𞁋				𞁊	𞁌	(𞁌̈)	𞁍	𞁎	𞁫	𞁏	𞁭		𞁐
Overscript			◌ꙴ			◌𞂏	◌ꙶ							
Subscript		𞁧		𞁩		𞁨	(𞁨̈)						𞁪	

Additional medieval Cyrillic modifier letters
	Ꙋ	Ѡ	Ѣ	Ꙗ	Ѥ	Ѧ	Ѫ	Ѭ	Ѳ	Ꙑ
Superscript										𞁬
Overscript	◌ⷹ	◌ꙻ	◌ⷺ	◌ⷼ	◌ꚟ	◌ⷽ	◌ⷾ	◌ⷿ	◌ⷴ	

Superscript and subscript ё, ї, й, ў, ќ etc. are handled with diacritics, ⟨𞀵̈ 𞁌̈ 𞀸̆ 𞁁̆ 𞀹́⟩ etc. Many of the Cyrillic characters were added to the Cyrillic Extended-D block, which was added to the free Gentium and Andika fonts with version 6.2 in February 2023.

See also Unicode Small caps, Fullwidths, and Mathematical alphanumerics.

=== Superscript IPA ===
The Latin Extended-F block was created for the remaining superscript IPA letters. They are supported by the free Gentium and Andika fonts. Additional superscript characters for historical and para-IPA letters were released with version 18 of the Unicode Standard in 2026.

==== Consonant letters ====
The Unicode characters for superscript (modifier) IPA and extIPA consonant letters are as follows. The entire Latin Extended-F block is dedicated to superscript IPA. Characters for sounds with secondary articulation are set off in parentheses and placed below the letter for the primary articulation. Many were published with Unicode 18 in September 2026, and so will display as tofu without an updated font.

Superscript variants of IPA, extIPA and para-IPA consonants, with their Unicode code points
	Bilabial		Labiodental		Dental		Alveolar		Postalveolar		Retroflex		Palatal		Velar		Uvular		Pharyngeal		Glottal	
Nasal		m ᵐ 1D50		ɱ ᶬ 1DAC				n ⁿ 207F (ᶇ 𝿷); 1DFF7				ɳ ᶯ 1DAF		ɲ ᶮ 1DAE (ȵ 𝿱); 1DFF1		ŋ ᵑ 1D51		ɴ ᶰ 1DB0				
Plosive	p ᵖ 1D56	b ᵇ 1D47	ȹ 𝿟 1DFDF	ȸ 𝿞 1DFDE			t ᵗ 1D57 (ƫ ᶵ); 1DB5	d ᵈ 1D48 (ᶁ 𝿵); 1DFF5			ʈ 𐞯 107AF	ɖ 𐞋 1078B	c ᶜ 1D9C (ȶ 𝿲); 1DFF2	ɟ ᶡ 1DA1 (ȡ 𝿯); 1DFEF	k ᵏ 1D4F	ɡ ᶢ 1DA2 g ᵍ 1D4D	q 𐞥 107A5	ɢ 𐞒 10792	ʡ 𐞳 107B3		ʔ ˀ 02C0	
Affricate							ʦ 𐞬 107AC	ʣ 𐞇 10787	ʧ 𐞮 107AE (𝼬 𝿤); 1DFE4	ʤ 𐞊 1078A (𝼫 𝿠); 1DFE0	ꭧ 𐞭 107AD (𝼜 𝿥); 1DFE5	ꭦ 𐞈 10788 (𝼙 𝿡); 1DFE1	(ʨ 𐞫); 107AB	(ʥ 𐞉); 10789								
Fricative	ɸ ᶲ 1DB2	β ᵝ 1D5D	f ᶠ 1DA0	v ᵛ 1D5B	θ ᶿ 1DBF	ð ᶞ 1D9E	s ˢ 02E2 (ᶊ 𝿸); 1DFF8	z ᶻ 1DBB (ᶎ 𝿹); 1DFF9	ʃ ᶴ 1DB4 (ʆ 𝿢); 1DFE2	ʒ ᶾ 1DBE (ʓ 𝿦); 1DFE6	ʂ ᶳ 1DB3 (ᶘ 𝿣); 1DFE3	ʐ ᶼ 1DBC (ᶚ 𝿧); 1DFE7	ç ᶜ̧ (Note: Superscript ⟨ç⟩ is composed of superscript c and a combining cedilla, which should display properly in a good font. Superscript c was specifically requested for this purpose in Unicode proposal L2/03-180.); 1D9C+0327 (ɕ ᶝ); 1D9D	ʝ ᶨ 1DA8 (ʑ ᶽ); 1DBD	x ˣ 02E3 (ɧ 𐞗); 10797	ɣ ˠ 02E0	χ ᵡ 1D61	ʁ ʶ 02B6	ħ 𐞕 10795 (ʩ 𐞐); 10790	ʕ ˤ (Note: U+02E4 ˤ MODIFIER LETTER SMALL REVERSED GLOTTAL STOP is the superscript variant of U+0295 ʕ LATIN LETTER PHARYNGEAL VOICED FRICATIVE and is defined for IPA use. The similar character U+02C1 ˁ MODIFIER LETTER REVERSED GLOTTAL STOP is a reversed U+02C0 ˀ MODIFIER LETTER GLOTTAL STOP, perhaps a gelded reversed question mark. Fonts are inconsistent in whether they look different and what the difference is.); 02E4	h ʰ 02B0 (ꞕ 𝿶); 1DFF6	ɦ ʱ 02B1
Approximant				ʋ ᶹ 1DB9				ɹ ʴ 02B4				ɻ ʵ 02B5		j ʲ 02B2 (ɥ ᶣ); 1DA3	(ʍ ꭩ); AB69	ɰ ᶭ 1DAD (w ʷ); 02B7						
Tap/flap				ⱱ 𐞰 107B0				ɾ 𐞩 107A9				ɽ 𐞨 107A8										
Trill	ᴘ 𝿑 1DFD1	ʙ 𐞄 10784						r ʳ 02B3										ʀ 𐞪 107AA	ʜ 𐞖 10796	ʢ 𐞴 107B4		
Lateral fricative							ɬ 𐞛 1079B (ʪ 𐞙); 10799	ɮ 𐞞 1079E (ʫ 𐞚); 1079A			ꞎ 𐞝 1079D	𝼅 𐞟 1079F	𝼆 𐞡 107A1	(𝽧)	𝼄 𐞜 1079C							
Lateral approximant								l ˡ 02E1 (ᶅ ᶪ); 1DAA				ɭ ᶩ 1DA9		ʎ 𐞠 107A0 (ȴ 𝿰); 1DFF0		ʟ ᶫ 1DAB (ɫ ꭞ) (Note: In Microsoft fonts, superscript ⟨ɫ⟩ (with one middle tilde) was erroneously designed as a superscript ⟨ꬸ⟩ (with two middle tildes).); AB5E						
Lateral tap/flap								ɺ 𐞦 107A6				𝼈 𐞧 107A7										
Implosive	ƥ 𝿼 1DFFC	ɓ 𐞅 10785					ƭ 𝿾 1DFFE	ɗ 𐞌 1078C			𝼉 𝿿 1DFFF	ᶑ 𐞍 1078D	ƈ 𝿺 1DFFA	ʄ 𐞘 10798	ƙ 𝿻 1DFFB	ɠ 𐞓 10793	ʠ 𝿽 1DFFD	ʛ 𐞔 10794				
Click release	ʘ 𐞵 107B5	ɋ			ǀ 𐞶 107B6	ʇ 𐞻 107BB	ǃ ꜝ A71D	ʗ 𐞽 107BD			𝼊 𐞹 107B9	ψ 𝿳 1DFF3	ǂ 𐞸 107B8	𝼋 𐞿 107BF	(ʞ 𐞾); 107BE							
Lateral click release							ǁ 𐞷 107B7	ʖ 𐞼 107BC														
Percussive (Note: U+A71D ⟨ꜝ⟩ and A71E ⟨ꜞ⟩ were adopted as the Africanist equivalents of the IPA characters ⟨ꜜ⟩ downstep and ⟨ꜛ⟩ upstep. Their correspondence to the IPA click letter ⟨ǃ⟩ and the extIPA percussive consonant ⟨¡⟩ is thus accidental. The other percussive letters, ⟨ʬ⟩ and ⟨ʭ⟩, do not have superscript support in Unicode, though they can be hacked by stacking diacritics as here.)	ʬ ᷱᷱ (hack)				ʭ ͆͆ (hack)		¡ ꜞ A71E															

Ejectives
The spacing diacritic for ejective consonants, U+2BC, works with superscript letters despite not being superscript itself: ⟨ᵖʼ ᵗʼ ᶜʼ ᵏˣʼ⟩. If a distinction needs to be made, the combining apostrophe U+315 may be used: ⟨ᵖ̕ ᵗ̕ ᶜ̕ ᵏˣ̕⟩. The spacing diacritic should be used for a baseline letter with a superscript release, such as [tˢʼ] or [kˣʼ], where the scope of the apostrophe includes the non-superscript letter, but the combining apostrophe U+315 might be used to indicate a weakly articulated ejective consonant like [ᵗ̕] or [ᵏ̕], where the whole consonant is written as a superscript, or together with U+2BC when separate apostrophes have scope over the base and modifier letters, as in ⟨pʼᵏˣ̕⟩.

Secondary superscripting
Spacing diacritics, as in ⟨tʲ⟩, cannot be secondarily superscripted in plain text: ⟨ᵗʲ⟩. (In this instance, the old IPA letter for [tʲ], ⟨ƫ⟩, has a superscript variant in Unicode, U+1DB5 ⟨ᶵ⟩, but that is not generally the case.)

Retired IPA
Among older IPA letters, the most common letters with palatal hook are supported; they are displayed in the table above. IPA once had an idiosyncratic curl on some of the palatalized letters: these are the fricative letters ⟨ʆ ʓ⟩ and the homologous affricates. (The similar lateral fricative 𝽧 is not supported.) Old-style IPA click letters, voiceless implosives, and the retired letters ⟨ƞ 𝿜⟩ and ⟨ɼ 𝿝⟩ are also supported. The German dialectological letter ⟨ꜧ⟩ (U+A727) approximates an old graphic variant of ⟨ɮ⟩. Its superscript is supported at ⟨ꭜ⟩ (U+AB5C).

Para-IPA
Among para-IPA letters, superscript variants of Sinological ⟨ȡ ȴ ȵ ȶ⟩, of the Bantuist labio-dental plosives ⟨ȹ⟩ and ⟨ȸ⟩, of the central semivowels ⟨ɉ⟩, ⟨ɥ̶⟩, and ⟨w̶⟩, of the extended old-style click letters ⟨𝼋⟩ and ⟨ψ⟩, and of the voiceless bilabial trill ⟨ᴘ⟩ are supported.

==== Vowel letters ====
The Unicode characters for superscript (modifier) IPA vowel letters, plus a pair of extended letters ⟨ᵻ ᵿ⟩ found in some English dictionaries and ⟨ω⟩ used by some phoneticians, as well those found in as in Sinological phonetic notation, are as follows. Recently retired alternative letters such as ⟨ɩ ɷ⟩ are also supported; they are set off in parentheses and placed below the modern IPA letters.

Superscript IPA and para-IPA vowels and semivowels
	Front		Central		Back	
Semivowel	j ʲ 02B2	ɥ ᶣ 1DA3	ɉ 𝿙 𝼾 𝿘 𝼿 𝿛 1DFD9 1DFD8 1DFDB		ɰ ᶭ 1DAD	w ʷ 02B7
Extra-close			ʅ 𝿬 1DFEC	ʯ 𝿮 1DFEE	ɿ 𝿫 1DFEB	ʮ 𝿭 1DFED
Close	i ⁱ 2071	y ʸ 02B8	ɨ ᶤ 1DA4	ʉ ᶶ 1DB6	ɯ ᵚ 1D5A	u ᵘ 1D58
Near-close	ɪ ᶦ 1DA6 (ɩ ᶥ); 1DA5	ʏ 𐞲 107B2	ᵻ ᶧ 1DA7 (ᵼ)	ᵿ 𝿚 1DFDA (𝽓)	(ω 𝿴); 1DFF4	ʊ ᶷ 1DB7 (ɷ 𐞤); 107A4
Close-mid	e ᵉ 1D49	ø 𐞢 107A2	ɘ 𐞎 1078E	ɵ ᶱ 1DB1	ɤ 𐞑 10791	o ᵒ 1D52
Mid	ᴇ 𝿪 1DFEA		ə ᵊ 1D4A			ꭥ
Open-mid	ɛ ᵋ 1D4B	œ ꟹ A7F9	ɜ ᶟ 1D9F (ᴈ ᵌ) (Note: U+1D4C ᵌ MODIFIER LETTER SMALL TURNED OPEN E and U+1D9F ᶟ MODIFIER LETTER SMALL REVERSED OPEN E are mistakenly both defined as modifier U+025C ɜ LATIN SMALL LETTER REVERSED OPEN E in their Unicode properties, though the former is named as the modifier variant of U+1D08 ᴈ LATIN SMALL LETTER TURNED OPEN E.); 1D4C	ɞ 𐞏 1078F (ʚ)	ʌ ᶺ 1DBA	ɔ ᵓ 1D53
Near-open	æ 𐞃 10783		ɐ ᵄ 1D44			
Open	a ᵃ 1D43	ɶ 𐞣 107A3	ᴀ 𝿩 1DFE9		ɑ ᵅ 1D45	ɒ ᶛ 1D9B

Rhotic vowels
The precomposed Unicode rhotic vowel letters ⟨ɚ ɝ⟩ are not directly supported. The rhotic diacritic U+02DE ⟨◌˞⟩ should be used instead: ⟨ᵊ˞ ᶟ˞⟩.

Retired IPA
Among older letters, ⟨ᴜ⟩ (U+1D1C), a graphic variant of ⟨ʊ⟩, is supported at ⟨ᶸ⟩ (U+1DB8). The retired and later briefly resurrected vowel letter ⟨ʚ⟩ (U+029A) is not supported as a superscript, only its reversed replacement ⟨ɞ⟩ is.

Para-IPA
Among para-IPA letters, Sinological superscript ⟨ɿ ʅ ʮ ʯ ⟩ were added in version 18 of the Unicode Standard, as were Sinological ⟨ᴀ ᴇ⟩ and the English dictionary and phonetics symbols ⟨ᵿ⟩ and ⟨ω⟩. The Americanist conventions ⟨ᵾ⟩ and ⟨ꭥ⟩ do not have superscripts encoded or scheduled.

==== Length marks ====
The two length marks are also supported:

Length marks
Long	Half-long
ː 𐞁 10781	ˑ 𐞂 10782

These are used to add length to another superscript, such as ⟨Cʰ𐞁⟩ or ⟨Cʰ𐞂⟩ for long aspiration.

==== Wildcards ====
Superscript wildcards (full caps) are largely supported: e.g. ᴺC (prenasalized consonant), ꟲN (prestopped nasal), Pꟳ (fricative release), D꟱ (sibilant release, added to Unicode in 2025), NᴾF (epenthetic plosive), CVNᵀ (tone-bearing syllable), Cᴸ (liquid or lateral release), Cᴿ (rhotic or resonant release), Vᴳ (off-glide/diphthong), Cⱽ (fleeting vowel). Superscript Ʞ for fleeting/epenthetic click is not included in the Unicode Standard. Other basic Latin superscript wildcards for tone and weak indeterminate sounds, as described in International Phonetic Alphabet § Capital letters, are mostly supported. (See table in the Latin section.)

==== Combining marks and subscripts ====
In addition to superscripts, a very few IPA letters beyond the basic Latin alphabet have combining forms or are supported as subscripts:

Additional IPA modifier letters
	ɑ	æ	β	ç	ð	ə	ɣ	ʃ	ʍ	χ	ʔ	ʼ	¡
Overscript	◌ᷧ	◌ᷔ	◌ᷩ	◌ᷗ	◌ᷙ	◌ᷪ		◌ᷯ			◌̉ (Note: This Unicode character is actually the Vietnamese diacritic dấu hỏi, but the same shape is used for laryngealization in phonetic notation, e.g. in Sistemas fonológicos de idiomas colombianos II. Editorial Townsend. 1973.)	◌̓	
Subscript			ᵦ			ₔ	𝿐			ᵪ			ꜟ
Underscript									◌ᫀ			◌̦	

== Composite characters ==
Primarily for compatibility with earlier character sets, Unicode contains a number of characters that compose super- and subscripts with other symbols. In most fonts these render much better than attempts to construct these symbols from the above characters or by using markup.

- The Latin-1 Supplement block contains the precomposed fractions ½, ¼, and ¾. The copyright © and registered trademark signs ® are also in this block; they are set as superscript in some fonts.
- The General Punctuation block contains the permille sign ‰ and the per-ten-thousand sign ‱, and Basic Latin has the percent sign %.
- The Number Forms block contains several precomposed fractions: ⅐ ⅑ ⅒ ⅓ ⅔ ⅕ ⅖ ⅗ ⅘ ⅙ ⅚ ⅛ ⅜ ⅝ ⅞ ⅟ ↉.
- The Letterlike Symbols block contains a few symbols composed of subscript and superscript characters: ℀ ℁ ℅ ℆ № ℠ ™ ⅍.
- The Enclosed Alphanumeric Supplement block contains three superscript abbreviations 🅪 🅫 🅬: MC for marque de commerce (trademark), MD for marque déposée (registered trademark), both used in Canada; MR for marca registrada (registered trademark) in Spanish and Portuguese speaking countries.
- The Miscellaneous Technical block has one additional subscript, a subscript 10 (⏨), for the purpose of scientific notation.
- The Unified Canadian Aboriginal Syllabics and its Extended blocks contain several letters composed with superscripted letters to indicate extended sound values: Main block ᐂ ᐫ ᐬ ᐭ ᐮ ᐰ ᑍ ᑧ ᑨ ᑩ ᑪ ᑬ ᒅ ᒆ ᒇ ᒈ ᒊ ᒤ ᓁ ᓔ ᓮ ᔌ ᔍ ᔎ ᔏ ᔧ ᕅ ᕔ ᕿ ᖀ ᖁ ᖂ ᖃ ᖄ ᖎ ᖏ ᖐ ᖑ ᖒ ᖓ ᖔ ᙯ ᙰ ᙱ ᙲ ᙳ ᙴ ᙵ ᙶ, Extended block ᢰ ᢱ ᢲ ᢳ ᢴ ᢵ ᢶ ᢷ ᢸ ᢹ ᢺ ᢻ ᢼ ᢽ ᢾ ᢿ ᣀ ᣁ ᣂ ᣃ ᣄ ᣅ.
