= Finno-Ugric transcription =

Phonetic alphabet for Uralic languages

Finno-Ugric transcription (FUT), or the Uralic Phonetic Alphabet (UPA), is a phonetic transcription or notational system used predominantly for the transcription and reconstruction of Uralic languages. It was first published in 1901 by Eemil Nestor Setälä, a Finnish linguist; it was somewhat modified in the 1970s.

FUT differs from the International Phonetic Alphabet (IPA) notation in several ways, notably in exploiting italics or boldface rather than using brackets to delimit text, in the use of small capitals for devoicing, and in more frequent use of diacritics to differentiate places of articulation.

The basic FUT characters are based on the Finnish alphabet where possible, with extensions taken from Cyrillic and Greek orthographies. Small-capital letters and some novel diacritics are also used.

Unlike the IPA, which is usually transcribed in Roman typeface, FUT is transcribed in italic and bold typeface. Its extended characters are found in the Phonetic Extensions and Phonetic Extensions Supplement blocks. Computer font support is available through many fonts intended for phonetic transcription, though some lower-case and small-capital letters may not be visibly distinct in instances such as o.

== Vowels ==
Several vowel transcription systems have been used in FUT; the chart below is just one example. A vowel to the left of a dot is illabial (unrounded); to the right is labial (rounded). The open-mid row may be omitted for certain lects.

	Front	Central	Back
Close	i • ü	i̮ • u̮	ị • u
Close-mid	e • ö	e̮ • o̮	ẹ • o
Open-mid	ɛ • ɔ̈	ɛ̮ • ɔ̮	ɛ̣ • ɔ
Open	ä • ɑ̈	a̮ • ɑ̮	a • ɑ

In addition:

- y and ɯ may be used for close front and central rounded ü and u̮.
- æ may be used for the vowel between ä and ɛ; œ between ɑ̈ and ɔ̈; ø between ɔ̈ and ö.
- å (or aₒ when other diacritics are present) may be used for rounded open vowels instead of ɑ.
- ᴖ may be used for open-mid rounded vowels instead of ɔ; ᴗ for open unrounded vowels instead of a.
- FUT has dedicated characters for wildcards or to denote a vowel of uncertain quality:
  - ʌ (or in some sources ɜ) denotes any vowel.
  - ᴕ (in some sources with the top ring closed) denotes any back vowel.
  - ᴕ̈ denotes any front vowel.
  - ə may denote any central vowel, though more typically denotes a reduced e.
  - ɔ may denote any devoiced vowel in systems which do not use it for rounded open-mid vowels.

== Consonants ==
The following table describes the consonants of FUT. The following can be noted:

- A 'spirant' in this usage is a non-sibilant fricative.
- Under 'approximants', v w j ɦ and their voiceless counterparts are 'semivowels', while ɹ ɹ̤ are 'vibrationless rhotics'.
- Palatalized consonants are indicated with an acute accent. Only a few are shown in the table; the velar letters with an acute are commonly used for palatal consonants.
- A few obvious expansions have been made, such as voiceless ʟ̣ to pair with voiced ḷ, and the fully expanded affricate series.

FUT consonants
	Bilabial	Labiodental	Dental	Alveolar		Palatalised alveolar		Retroflex		Palatal (prevelar)	Palatalised velar	Velar	Postvelar	Uvular	Glottal
Plosive	p	p̦	ț	t		t́		ṭ		k͕	ḱ	k	k͔	k̤	ʔ
Plosive	ʙ	ʙ̦	ᴅ̦	ᴅ		ᴅ́		ᴅ̣		ɢ͕	ɢ́	ɢ	ɢ͔	ɢ̤	
Plosive	b	b̦	d̦	d		d́		ḍ		g͕	ǵ	g	g͔	g̤	
Spirant fricative	φ	f		ϑ		ϑ́		ϑ̣			χ́	χ			ȟ
Spirant fricative	β	v̌		δ		δ́		δ̣			γ́	γ			ᴤ
Sibilant fricative				s	š	ś	š́	ṣ	ṣ̌						
Sibilant fricative				ᴢ	ᴢ̌	ᴢ́	ᴢ̌́	ᴢ̣	ᴢ̣̌						
Sibilant fricative				z	ž	ź	ž́	ẓ	ẓ̌						
Sibilant affricate				c	č	ć	č́	c̣	č̣						
Sibilant affricate				ᴣ	ᴣ̌	ᴣ́	ᴣ̌́	ᴣ̣	ᴣ̣̌						
Sibilant affricate				ʒ	ǯ	ʒ́	ǯ́	ʒ̣	ǯ̣						
Approximant	ᴡ	ᴠ		ᴚ						ᴊ				ᴚ̤	h
Approximant	w	v		ɹ						j				ɹ̤	ɦ
Lateral				ʟ	ᴌ	ʟ́		ʟ̣				ᴫ			
Lateral				l	ł	ĺ		ḷ				л (Note: The consonants ᴫ л are defined as dark alveolars, with ᴌ ł being 'half-dark', but other sources define ᴫ л as velar. They are distinct in italic typeface, which is the norm for FUT phonetic notation.)			
Trill	ᴪ			ʀ		ʀ́		ʀ̣						ʀ̤	
Trill	ψ			r		ŕ		ṛ						r̤	
Flap				ᴆ										ᴆ̤	
Flap				ð										ð̤	
Nasal	ᴍ			ɴ		ɴ́		ɴ̣			ᴎ́	ᴎ (Note: Historically substituted with a Cyrillic small letter и.)			
Nasal	m	m̦		n		ń		ṇ			ή	η (Note: Most sources historically used a Greek small letter eta to represent a voiced velar nasal, but this was a typographical substitution. With modern typography and encoding, one may prefer to use ŋ or ƞ.)			

Small-cap (voiceless) and lower-case (voiced) л are distinct when italic.

When there are two consonants in a given space, the bottom row is voiced and the top row is voiceless; when there are three, the centre row is lenis or partially devoiced, and the top row is fortis or fully devoiced (tenuis). Some sources add a second middle row for the plosives and affricates with small capitals of the voiceless consonants, so that a four way distinction between fortis, lenis, partially voiced, and fully voiced is maintained.

In the columns where they appear, the sibilants are further split into two sub-columns: the left columns for each are described as "narrow" sibilants, while the right columns are described as "wide" sibilants. Wide alveolar UPA š is approximately IPA [ʃ], wide palatalised alveolar UPA š́ is approximately IPA [ɕ].

ʟ̌ l‌̌ (not shown in the table) are lateral fricatives. v̌ and ȟ in the table are also fricatives derived from letters for approximants.

Other sources have ᴃ and ᴆ (ᴅ̶) for fricative ʙ ᴅ, ᴩ ϱ for the uvular trills, and ᴥ for the glottal stop ʔ.

The Uralic languages transcribed with this system do not contain non-pulmonic consonants except paralinguistically, thus only clicks are supported by FUT. There are two conventions: a leftward arrow, for p˿ b˿ t˿ d˿ ḱ˿ ǵ˿ etc., and Greek letters, for ᴨ π ᴛ τ ᴋ κ etc. Nasal clicks can presumably be written ᴍ˿ m˿ ɴ˿ n˿ ᴎ́˿ ή˿ etc. under the first convention.

== Modifiers ==
From extremely short (superscript) to extra-long (circumflex), length of vowels and consonants is indicated as follows:

ᵃ ă a a˴ à a͐ ā â

FUT modifier characters
Example	Description	Use
ä	diaeresis above	'Palatal' (front) vowel; interdental consonant (e.g. ẗ interdental t)
ạ	dot below	'Velar' (back) vowel; 'cacuminal' (retroflex) consonant
a̤	diaeresis below	Uvular consonant
ā	macron	Long form of a vowel or consonant
aa	doubled character	Long form of a vowel or consonant
a͔	left arrowhead below	Retracted form of a vowel or consonant (e.g. t͔ post-alveolar t)
a͕	right arrowhead below	Advanced form of a vowel or consonant (e.g. t͕ pre-alveolar t)
a̭	circumflex below	Raised variant of a vowel
a̬	caron below	Lowered variant of a vowel
ǎ	caron above	Fricative variant of an approximant; 'wide' variant of a sibilant
ă	breve	Shorter or reduced vowel
a̮	breve below	Central vowel
a̯	inverted breve below	Non-syllabic variant of a vowel
á	acute accent	Palatalized variant of a consonant; may be moved to the right of letters with an ascender, as with δˊ.
ᴀ	small capital	Unvoiced or lenis variant of a sound
ᵃ	superscripted character	Very short sound
ₐ	subscripted character	Coarticulation due to surrounding sounds, or intermediate sound
ɐ	rotated character	Reduced form of sound. Letters ambiguous when rotated 180° are rotated 90°, as with ᴞ.

For diphthongs, triphthongs and prosody, Finno-Ugric transcription uses several forms of the tie or double breve:

- The triple inverted breve or triple breve below indicates a triphthong
- The double inverted breve, also known as the ligature tie, marks a diphthong
- The double inverted breve below indicates a syllable boundary between vowels
- The undertie is used for prosody
- The inverted undertie is used for prosody.

== Differences from IPA ==
A major difference is that IPA notation distinguishes between phonetic and phonemic transcription by enclosing the transcription between either brackets [aɪ pʰiː eɪ] or slashes /ai pi e/. FUT instead uses italic typeface for the former and bold typeface for the latter.

For phonetic transcription, numerous small differences from IPA come into relevance:

- For the voiced dental fricative, FUT uses a Greek delta δ, while IPA uses the letter eth [ð]. In FUT, eth ð stands for an alveolar tap, IPA [ɾ].
- FUT uses Greek chi χ for the voiceless velar fricative. In IPA, [χ] stands for a voiceless uvular fricative, while the velar counterpart is [x] (not used in FUT except as a wildcard for any consonant).
- FUT uses small caps for devoiced sounds (ᴀ ʙ ᴅ ɢ ᴇ etc.), while IPA uses a ring diacritic.

Examples:

Sound	FUT	IPA
Alveolar tap	ð	[ɾ]
Voiced dental fricative	δ	[ð]
Voiceless alveolar lateral approximant	ʟ	[l̥]
Velar lateral approximant	л	[ʟ]
Voiceless alveolar nasal	ɴ	[n̥]
Uvular nasal	n̤*	[ɴ]
Voiceless alveolar trill	ʀ	[r̥]
Uvular trill	r̤	[ʀ]

*Not recognized in any sources, shown for example purposes.

== Encoding ==
The IETF language tags register fonupa as a subtag for text in this notation.

== Font support ==
Few system fonts support the small capitals. Support is available through any good phonetics font, such as (among free fonts) Gentium, Andika, Noto, Segoe and EB Garamond, though lower-case and small-capital ᴄ, л, o, v, w and z may not be distinct in italic typeface and are rarely distinct in bold. DejaVu and EB Garamond do not support the stacked diacritics in š́, ᴢ̌́, ž́. EB Garamond includes the Unicode small capitals in its roman typeface but not in italic or bold, so automated formatting is applied, which makes the small capitals more distinct. Following are pairs of small capital and lower case in these fonts; the fonts must be installed on your computer or phone to display here.

Comparison of free fonts
Browser default font	italic	ᴄ c	ᴫ л	ᴏ o	ᴜ u	ᴠ v	ᴡ w	ᴢ z	š́ ž́
Browser default font	bold	**ᴄ c**	**ᴫ л**	**ᴏ o**	**ᴜ u**	**ᴠ v**	**ᴡ w**	**ᴢ z**	**š́ ž́**
Gentium	italic	ᴄ c	ᴫ л	ᴏ o	ᴜ u	ᴠ v	ᴡ w	ᴢ z	š́ ž́
Gentium	bold	**ᴄ c**	**ᴫ л**	**ᴏ o**	**ᴜ u**	**ᴠ v**	**ᴡ w**	**ᴢ z**	**š́ ž́**
Andika	italic	ᴄ c	ᴫ л	ᴏ o	ᴜ u	ᴠ v	ᴡ w	ᴢ z	š́ ž́
Andika	bold	**ᴄ c**	**ᴫ л**	**ᴏ o**	**ᴜ u**	**ᴠ v**	**ᴡ w**	**ᴢ z**	**š́ ž́**
Noto Serif	italic	ᴄ c	ᴫ л	ᴏ o	ᴜ u	ᴠ v	ᴡ w	ᴢ z	š́ ž́
Noto Serif	bold	**ᴄ c**	**ᴫ л**	**ᴏ o**	**ᴜ u**	**ᴠ v**	**ᴡ w**	**ᴢ z**	**š́ ž́**
Noto Sans	italic	ᴄ c	ᴫ л	ᴏ o	ᴜ u	ᴠ v	ᴡ w	ᴢ z	š́ ž́
Noto Sans	bold	**ᴄ c**	**ᴫ л**	**ᴏ o**	**ᴜ u**	**ᴠ v**	**ᴡ w**	**ᴢ z**	**š́ ž́**
Segoe UI	italic	ᴄ c	ᴫ л	ᴏ o	ᴜ u	ᴠ v	ᴡ w	ᴢ z	š́ ž́
Segoe UI	bold	**ᴄ c**	**ᴫ л**	**ᴏ o**	**ᴜ u**	**ᴠ v**	**ᴡ w**	**ᴢ z**	**š́ ž́**
EB Garamond	italic	ᴄ c	л	ᴏ o	ᴜ u	ᴠ v	ᴡ w	ᴢ z	š́ ž́
EB Garamond	bold	**ᴄ c**	**- л**	**ᴏ o**	**ᴜ u**	**ᴠ v**	**ᴡ w**	**ᴢ z**	**š́ ž́**

== Sample ==
This section contains some sample words from both Uralic languages and English (using Australian English) along with comparisons to the IPA transcription.

Sample FUT words
Language	FUT	IPA	Meaning
English	šᴉp	[ʃɪp]	'ship'
English	rän	[ɹæn]	'ran'
English	ʙo̭o̭d	[b̥oːd]	'bored'
Moksha	və̂ďän	[vɤ̈dʲæn]	'I sow'
Udmurt	miśkᴉ̑nᴉ̑	[miɕkɪ̈nɪ̈]	'to wash'
Forest Nenets	ŋàrŋū̬"ᴲ	[ŋɑˑrŋu̞ːʔə̥]	'nostril'
Hill Mari	pᴞ·ń₍ᴅ́ᴢ̌́ö̭	[ˈpʏnʲd̥͡ʑ̥ø]	'pine'
Skolt Sami	pŭə̆ī̮ᵈt̄ėi	[pŭə̆ɨːd̆tːəi]	'ermine'

== See also ==
- Americanist phonetic notation

== Bibliography ==
- Setälä, E. N. (1901). "Über transskription der finnisch-ugrischen sprachen". Finnisch-ugrische Forschungen (in German) (1). Helsingfors, Leipzig: 15–52.
- Sovijärvi, Antti; Peltola, Reino (1970). "Suomalais-ugrilainen tarkekirjoitus" (PDF). Helsingin Yliopiston Fonetiikan Laitoksen Julkaisuja (in Finnish) (9). University of Helsinki. hdl:10224/4089.
- Posti, Lauri; Itkonen, Terho (1973). "FU-transkription yksinkertaistaminen. Az FU-átírás egyszerűsítése. Zur Vereinfachung der FU-Transkription. On Simplifying of the FU-transcription". Castrenianumin Toimitteita (7). University of Helsinki. ISBN 951-45-0282-5. ISSN 0355-0141.
- Ruppel, Klaas; Aalto, Tero; Everson, Michael (2009-01-27). "L2/09-028: Proposal to encode additional characters for the Uralic Phonetic Alphabet" (PDF). Unicode.
