= Superscript En =

Cyrillic letter used in Bezhta and Godoberi

- ᵸ

Usage
- Writing system: Cyrillic
- Type: Alphabetic
- Sound values: [◌̃]

Modifier letter Cyrillic en or superscript en (ᵸ) is a phonetic symbol and a grapheme used in the writing of the Bezhta and Godoberi languages. It is formed from the Cyrillic letter en ⟨н⟩ put in superscript form. U+1D78 ᵸ MODIFIER LETTER CYRILLIC EN

== Usage ==
This letter nasalizes the preceding sound in the Bezhta and Godoberi languages.

== Computing codes ==
Modifier letter superscript en can be represented by the following Unicode characters (Phonetic Extensions block):

Character information
Preview	ᵸ	
Unicode name	MODIFIER LETTER CYRILLIC EN	
Encodings	decimal	hex
Unicode	7544	U+1D78
UTF-8	225 181 184	E1 B5 B8
Numeric character reference	&#7544;	&#x1D78;

The character has no specified case, so it either displays as ^{н} or ^{Н}.

== See also ==
- Cyrillic script
- Н н : Cyrillic letter En
- H h : Latin letter H

== Bibliography ==
- Everson, Michael (26 February 1999). Optimizing Georgian representation in the BMP of the UCS (PDF).
- NSAI/ICTSCC/SC4; GSDIT (4 September 2003). Proposal to add Georgian and other characters to the BMP of the UCS (PDF).
