= Slate (typeface) =

Typeface

- OnePlus Slate font sample
- Category: Sans-serif
- Classification: Neo-grotesque
- Designer: Rod McDonald
- Foundry: Monotype
- Date created: 2006
- Shown here: OnePlus Slate

Slate is a neo-grotesque sans-serif typeface designed by Rod McDonald at Monotype Corporation in 2006, which was designed for high levels of legibility.

McDonald previously did research with the Canadian National Institute for the Blind (CNIB) focusing on maximizing the legibility of characters and readability of text, and the Slate family was designed for maximum legibility for both print and screen. The Slate family was also designed to be humanist, and as McDonald says "I didn't want a face with an 'engineered' look, or with any noticeable design gimmicks or devices."

== Variants ==
=== Slate Pro ===
Slate Pro is the UI font of the BlackBerry 10 operating system.

=== OnePlus Slate ===
OnePlus Slate was formerly the brand typeface of OnePlus and was an optional UI font for their Android-based OxygenOS since version 4.5.7, instead of Roboto. The font has 6 weights (Thin, Light, Regular, Medium, Bold, Heavy), but no italics.
