= Latin Extended-F =

- Range: U+10780..U+107BF (64 code points)
- Plane: SMP
- Scripts: Latin
- Assigned: 62 code points
- Unused: 2 reserved code points

Unicode Version History
- 14.0 (2021): 57 (+57)
- 18.0 (2026): 62 (+5)

Unicode documentation
- Code chart ∣ Web page

Latin Extended-F is a Unicode block containing modifier letters, nearly all IPA and extIPA, for phonetic transcription. The Latin Extended-F and -G blocks contain the first Latin characters defined outside of the Basic Multilingual Plane (BMP). They were added to the free Gentium and Andika fonts with version 6.2 in February 2023. Some computers have 𐞃, 𐞎 and 𐞥 supported on the font Calibri.

In 2020, the International Phonetic Association endorsed the encoding of superscript IPA letters in a proposal to the Unicode Commission for broader coverage of the IPA alphabet. The proposal covered all segmental IPA letters that were not yet supported, including the implicit retroflex letters ⟨ꞎ 𝼅 𝼈 ᶑ 𝼊 ⟩, as well as the two length marks ⟨ː ˑ⟩ and old-style affricate ligatures. A separate request by the International Clinical Phonetics and Linguistics Association for an expansion of extIPA coverage endorsed superscript variants of all extIPA fricative letters, specifically for the fricative release of consonants.

== Block ==
Latin Extended-F^{[1]}^{[2]} Official Unicode Consortium code chart (PDF)
	0	1	2	3	4	5	6	7	8	9	A	B	C	D	E	F
U+1078x	𐞀	𐞁	𐞂	𐞃	𐞄	𐞅		𐞇	𐞈	𐞉	𐞊	𐞋	𐞌	𐞍	𐞎	𐞏
U+1079x	𐞐	𐞑	𐞒	𐞓	𐞔	𐞕	𐞖	𐞗	𐞘	𐞙	𐞚	𐞛	𐞜	𐞝	𐞞	𐞟
U+107Ax	𐞠	𐞡	𐞢	𐞣	𐞤	𐞥	𐞦	𐞧	𐞨	𐞩	𐞪	𐞫	𐞬	𐞭	𐞮	𐞯
U+107Bx	𐞰		𐞲	𐞳	𐞴	𐞵	𐞶	𐞷	𐞸	𐞹	𐞺	𐞻	𐞼	𐞽	𐞾	𐞿
Notes 1.As of Unicode version 18.0 2.Grey areas indicate non-assigned code points

U+10786 and U+107B1 were proposed for superscript ꞵ and ꭓ (that is, for Latin variants of U+1D5D ᵝ MODIFIER LETTER SMALL BETA and U+1D61 ᵡ MODIFIER LETTER SMALL CHI) but were not assigned, with the points left reserved.

== History ==
The following Unicode-related documents record the purpose and process of defining specific characters in the Latin Extended-F block:

Version	Final code points (Note: Proposed code points and characters names may differ from final code points and names)	Count	L2 ID	WG2 ID	Document
14.0	U+10780, 10790, 10799..1079F, 107A1	10	L2/20-038		Miller, Kirk; Ball, Martin (2020-01-08), Unicode request for VoQS support
14.0	U+10780, 10790, 10799..1079F, 107A1	10	L2/20-039		Miller, Kirk; Ball, Martin (2020-01-08), Unicode request for extIPA support
14.0	U+10780, 10790, 10799..1079F, 107A1	10	L2/20-046		Anderson, Deborah; Whistler, Ken; Pournader, Roozbeh; Moore, Lisa; Liang, Hai (2020-01-10), "1a. Extended IPA and 1b. VoQS", Recommendations to UTC #162 January 2020 on Script Proposals
14.0	U+10780, 10790, 10799..1079F, 107A1	10	L2/20-116		Miller, Kirk; Ball, Martin (2020-04-14), Expansion of the extIPA and VoQS
14.0	U+10780, 10790, 10799..1079F, 107A1	10	L2/20-105		Anderson, Deborah; Whistler, Ken; Pournader, Roozbeh; Moore, Lisa; Constable, Peter; Liang, Hai (2020-04-20), "1a. Extended IPA and VoQS", Recommendations to UTC #163 April 2020 on Script Proposals
14.0	U+10780, 10790, 10799..1079F, 107A1	10	L2/20-116R		Miller, Kirk; Ball, Martin (2020-07-11), Expansion of the extIPA and VoQS
14.0	U+10780, 10790, 10799..1079F, 107A1	10	L2/20-169		Anderson, Deborah; Whistler, Ken; Pournader, Roozbeh; Moore, Lisa; Constable, Peter; Liang, Hai (2020-07-21), "3b. Expansion of the extIPA and VoQS", Recommendations to UTC #164 July 2020 on Script Proposals
14.0	U+10780, 10790, 10799..1079F, 107A1	10	L2/20-172		Moore, Lisa (2020-08-03), "Consensus 164-C9", UTC #164 Minutes
14.0	U+10780, 10790, 10799..1079F, 107A1	10	L2/20-250		Anderson, Deborah; Whistler, Ken; Pournader, Roozbeh; Moore, Lisa; Constable, Peter; Liang, Hai (2020-10-01), "1. Latin", Recommendations to UTC #165 October 2020 on Script Proposals
14.0	U+10780, 10790, 10799..1079F, 107A1	10	L2/20-266R	N5148R	Everson, Michael; Miller, Kirk (2020-11-09), Consolidated code chart of proposed phonetic characters
14.0	U+10780, 10790, 10799..1079F, 107A1	10	L2/21-021		Anderson, Deborah (2020-12-07), Reference doc numbers for L2/20-266R "Consolidated code chart of proposed phonetic characters" and IPA etc. code point and name changes
14.0	U+10780, 10790, 10799..1079F, 107A1	10	L2/21-016R		Anderson, Deborah; Whistler, Ken; Pournader, Roozbeh; Moore, Lisa; Liang, Hai (2021-01-14), "3a. Phonetic characters", Recommendations to UTC #166 January 2021 on Script Proposals
14.0	U+10780, 10790, 10799..1079F, 107A1	10	L2/21-009		Moore, Lisa (2021-01-27), "B.1 — 3a. Phonetic characters", UTC #166 Minutes
14.0	U+10781..10784, 10787..1078B, 1078E..1078F, 10791..10792, 10795..10797, 107A0, 107A2..107B0, 107B2..107B4	35	L2/20-266R	N5148R	Everson, Michael; Miller, Kirk (2020-11-09), Consolidated code chart of proposed phonetic characters
14.0	U+10781..10784, 10787..1078B, 1078E..1078F, 10791..10792, 10795..10797, 107A0, 107A2..107B0, 107B2..107B4	35	L2/20-252R		Miller, Kirk; Ashby, Michael (2020-11-08), Unicode request for IPA modifier-letters (a), pulmonic
14.0	U+10781..10784, 10787..1078B, 1078E..1078F, 10791..10792, 10795..10797, 107A0, 107A2..107B0, 107B2..107B4	35	L2/21-021		Anderson, Deborah (2020-12-07), Reference doc numbers for L2/20-266R "Consolidated code chart of proposed phonetic characters" and IPA etc. code point and name changes
14.0	U+10781..10784, 10787..1078B, 1078E..1078F, 10791..10792, 10795..10797, 107A0, 107A2..107B0, 107B2..107B4	35	L2/21-040		Miller, Kirk (2020-12-07), Addendum to Unicode requests for IPA modifier letters, L2/20-252 pulmonic and L2/20-253 non-pulmonic
14.0	U+10781..10784, 10787..1078B, 1078E..1078F, 10791..10792, 10795..10797, 107A0, 107A2..107B0, 107B2..107B4	35	L2/21-016R		Anderson, Deborah; Whistler, Ken; Pournader, Roozbeh; Moore, Lisa; Liang, Hai (2021-01-14), "3b. IPA Modifier Letters - Pulmonic", Recommendations to UTC #166 January 2021 on Script Proposals
14.0	U+10781..10784, 10787..1078B, 1078E..1078F, 10791..10792, 10795..10797, 107A0, 107A2..107B0, 107B2..107B4	35	L2/21-009		Moore, Lisa (2021-01-27), "B.1 — 3b. IPA Modifier Letters - Pulmonic", UTC #166 Minutes
14.0	U+10785, 1078C..1078D, 10793..10794, 10798, 107B5..107B9	11	L2/20-266R	N5148R	Everson, Michael; Miller, Kirk (2020-11-09), Consolidated code chart of proposed phonetic characters
14.0	U+10785, 1078C..1078D, 10793..10794, 10798, 107B5..107B9	11	L2/20-253R		Miller, Kirk; Ashby, Michael (2020-11-08), Unicode request for IPA modifier letters (b), non-pulmonic
14.0	U+10785, 1078C..1078D, 10793..10794, 10798, 107B5..107B9	11	L2/21-021		Anderson, Deborah (2020-12-07), Reference doc numbers for L2/20-266R "Consolidated code chart of proposed phonetic characters" and IPA etc. code point and name changes
14.0	U+10785, 1078C..1078D, 10793..10794, 10798, 107B5..107B9	11	L2/21-040		Miller, Kirk (2020-12-07), Addendum to Unicode requests for IPA modifier letters, L2/20-252 pulmonic and L2/20-253 non-pulmonic
14.0	U+10785, 1078C..1078D, 10793..10794, 10798, 107B5..107B9	11	L2/21-016R		Anderson, Deborah; Whistler, Ken; Pournader, Roozbeh; Moore, Lisa; Liang, Hai (2021-01-14), "3c. IPA Modifier Letters – Non-Pulmonic", Recommendations to UTC #166 January 2021 on Script Proposals
14.0	U+10785, 1078C..1078D, 10793..10794, 10798, 107B5..107B9	11	L2/21-009		Moore, Lisa (2021-01-27), "B.1 — 3c. IPA Modifier Letters – Non-Pulmonic", UTC #166 Minutes
14.0	U+107BA	1	L2/21-041		Miller, Kirk (2021-01-11), Unicode request for additional para-IPA letters
14.0	U+107BA	1	L2/21-016R		Anderson, Deborah; Whistler, Ken; Pournader, Roozbeh; Moore, Lisa; Liang, Hai (2021-01-14), "3h. Additional Para-IPA Letters", Recommendations to UTC #166 January 2021 on Script Proposals
14.0	U+107BA	1	L2/21-009		Moore, Lisa (2021-01-27), "B.1 — 3h. Additional Para-IPA Letters", UTC #166 Minutes
18.0	U+107BB..107BF	5	L2/24-049		Unicode support for historical and para-IPA letters, 2024-01-01
18.0	U+107BB..107BF	5	L2/24-052R		Miller, Kirk (2024-04-26), Unicode request for modifier pre-Kiel click letters
18.0	U+107BB..107BF	5	L2/24-068		Anderson, Deborah; Goregaokar, Manish; Kučera, Jan; Whistler, Ken; Pournader, Roozbeh; Constable, Peter (2024-04-18), "16. Modifier click letters", Recommendations to UTC #179 April 2024 on Script Proposals
18.0	U+107BB..107BF	5	L2/24-061		Constable, Peter (2024-04-29), "Consensus 179-C60", UTC #179 Minutes, "Provisionally assign 5 code points"
18.0	U+107BB..107BF	5	L2/24-166		Anderson, Deborah; Goregaokar, Manish; Kučera, Jan; Whistler, Ken; Pournader, Roozbeh; Constable, Peter (2024-07-18), "16", Recommendations to UTC #180 July 2024 on Script Proposals
18.0	U+107BB..107BF	5	L2/25-226		"Consensus 185-C40", UTC #185 Minutes, 2025-10-29, "UTC accepts for encoding in Unicode 18.0 ..."
