= Latin Extended-G =

- Range: U+1DF00..U+1DFFF (256 code points)
- Plane: SMP
- Scripts: Greek (2 char.); Latin (186 char.)
- Assigned: 188 code points
- Unused: 68 reserved code points

Unicode Version History
- 14.0 (2021): 31 (+31)
- 15.0 (2022): 37 (+6)
- 18.0 (2026): 188 (+151)

Unicode documentation
- Code chart ∣ Web page

Latin Extended-G is a Unicode block containing additional characters, many of them for phonetic transcription. Latin Extended-F and this block contain the first Latin characters defined outside of the Basic Multilingual Plane (BMP). They were both created in Unicode version 14 in 2021.

With the release of Unicode 18.0, support was added for the Initial Teaching Alphabet (ITA) and the English Phonotypic Alphabet (EPA), adding 151 characters.

Because this is a recently created block, font support is poor. Fonts that support at least some of Latin Extended-G include Gentium, Andika, Symbola, Unifont, Charis SIL, Catrinity, Noto Sans, Noto Serif, Iosevka, and AncientSans.

== Block ==
Latin Extended-G^{[1]}^{[2]} Official Unicode Consortium code chart (PDF)
| | 0 | 1 | 2 | 3 | 4 | 5 | 6 | 7 | 8 | 9 | A | B | C | D | E | F |
| U+1DF0x | 𝼀 | 𝼁 | 𝼂 | 𝼃 | 𝼄 | 𝼅 | 𝼆 | 𝼇 | 𝼈 | 𝼉 | 𝼊 | 𝼋 | 𝼌 | 𝼍 | 𝼎 | 𝼏 |
| U+1DF1x | 𝼐 | 𝼑 | 𝼒 | 𝼓 | 𝼔 | 𝼕 | 𝼖 | 𝼗 | 𝼘 | 𝼙 | 𝼚 | 𝼛 | 𝼜 | 𝼝 | 𝼞 | 𝼟 |
| U+1DF2x | 𝼠 | 𝼡 | 𝼢 | 𝼣 | 𝼤 | 𝼥 | 𝼦 | 𝼧 | 𝼨 | 𝼩 | 𝼪 | 𝼫 | 𝼬 | 𝼭 | 𝼮 | 𝼯 |
| U+1DF3x | 𝼰 | 𝼱 | 𝼲 | 𝼳 | 𝼴 | 𝼵 | 𝼶 | 𝼷 | 𝼸 | 𝼹 | 𝼺 | 𝼻 | 𝼼 | 𝼽 | 𝼾 | 𝼿 |
| U+1DF4x | 𝽀 | 𝽁 | 𝽂 | 𝽃 | 𝽄 | 𝽅 | 𝽆 | 𝽇 | 𝽈 | 𝽉 | 𝽊 | 𝽋 | 𝽌 | 𝽍 | 𝽎 | 𝽏 |
| U+1DF5x | 𝽐 | 𝽑 | 𝽒 | 𝽓 | 𝽔 | 𝽕 | 𝽖 | 𝽗 | 𝽘 | 𝽙 | 𝽚 | 𝽛 | 𝽜 | 𝽝 | 𝽞 | 𝽟 |
| U+1DF6x | 𝽠 | 𝽡 | 𝽢 | 𝽣 | 𝽤 | 𝽥 | 𝽦 | 𝽧 | 𝽨 | 𝽩 | 𝽪 | 𝽫 | 𝽬 | 𝽭 | 𝽮 | 𝽯 |
| U+1DF7x | 𝽰 | 𝽱 | 𝽲 | 𝽳 | 𝽴 | 𝽵 | 𝽶 | 𝽷 | 𝽸 | 𝽹 | 𝽺 | 𝽻 | 𝽼 | 𝽽 | 𝽾 | 𝽿 |
| U+1DF8x | 𝾀 | 𝾁 | | | | | | | | | | | | | | |
| U+1DF9x | 𝾐 | 𝾑 | 𝾒 | 𝾓 | 𝾔 | 𝾕 | 𝾖 | | | | | | | | | |
| U+1DFAx | | | | | | | | | | | | | | | | |
| U+1DFBx | | | | | | | | | | | | | | | | |
| U+1DFCx | | | | | | | | | | | | | | 𝿍 | 𝿎 | 𝿏 |
| U+1DFDx | 𝿐 | 𝿑 | 𝿒 | 𝿓 | 𝿔 | 𝿕 | 𝿖 | 𝿗 | 𝿘 | 𝿙 | 𝿚 | 𝿛 | 𝿜 | 𝿝 | 𝿞 | 𝿟 |
| U+1DFEx | 𝿠 | 𝿡 | 𝿢 | 𝿣 | 𝿤 | 𝿥 | 𝿦 | 𝿧 | 𝿨 | 𝿩 | 𝿪 | 𝿫 | 𝿬 | 𝿭 | 𝿮 | 𝿯 |
| U+1DFFx | 𝿰 | 𝿱 | 𝿲 | 𝿳 | 𝿴 | 𝿵 | 𝿶 | 𝿷 | 𝿸 | 𝿹 | 𝿺 | 𝿻 | 𝿼 | 𝿽 | 𝿾 | 𝿿 |
Notes 1.As of Unicode version 18.0 2.Grey areas indicate non-assigned code points

== History ==
The following Unicode-related documents record the purpose and process of defining specific characters in the Latin Extended-G block:

| Version | Final code points (Note: Proposed code points and characters names may differ from final code points and names) | Count | L2 ID | WG2 ID | Document |
|---|---|---|---|---|---|
| 14.0 | U+1DF00..1DF07 | 8 | L2/20-039 | | Miller, Kirk; Ball, Martin (2020-01-08), Unicode request for extIPA support |
| 14.0 | U+1DF00..1DF07 | 8 | L2/20-046 | | Anderson, Deborah; Whistler, Ken; Pournader, Roozbeh; Moore, Lisa; Liang, Hai (2020-01-10), "1a. Extended IPA", Recommendations to UTC #162 January 2020 on Script Proposals |
| 14.0 | U+1DF00..1DF07 | 8 | L2/20-116 | | Miller, Kirk; Ball, Martin (2020-04-14), Expansion of the extIPA and VoQS |
| 14.0 | U+1DF00..1DF07 | 8 | L2/20-105 | | Anderson, Deborah; Whistler, Ken; Pournader, Roozbeh; Moore, Lisa; Constable, Peter; Liang, Hai (2020-04-20), "1a. Extended IPA and VoQS", Recommendations to UTC #163 April 2020 on Script Proposals |
| 14.0 | U+1DF00..1DF07 | 8 | L2/20-116R | | Miller, Kirk; Ball, Martin (2020-07-11), Expansion of the extIPA and VoQS |
| 14.0 | U+1DF00..1DF07 | 8 | L2/20-169 | | Anderson, Deborah; Whistler, Ken; Pournader, Roozbeh; Moore, Lisa; Constable, Peter; Liang, Hai (2020-07-21), "3b. Expansion of the extIPA and VoQS", Recommendations to UTC #164 July 2020 on Script Proposals |
| 14.0 | U+1DF00..1DF07 | 8 | L2/20-172 | | Moore, Lisa (2020-08-03), "Consensus 164-C9", UTC #164 Minutes |
| 14.0 | U+1DF00..1DF07 | 8 | L2/20-250 | | Anderson, Deborah; Whistler, Ken; Pournader, Roozbeh; Moore, Lisa; Constable, Peter; Liang, Hai (2020-10-01), "1. Latin", Recommendations to UTC #165 October 2020 on Script Proposals |
| 14.0 | U+1DF00..1DF07 | 8 | L2/20-266R | N5148R | Everson, Michael; Miller, Kirk (2020-11-09), Consolidated code chart of proposed phonetic characters |
| 14.0 | U+1DF00..1DF07 | 8 | L2/21-021 | | Anderson, Deborah (2020-12-07), Reference doc numbers for L2/20-266R "Consolidated code chart of proposed phonetic characters" and IPA etc. code point and name changes |
| 14.0 | U+1DF00..1DF07 | 8 | L2/21-016R | | Anderson, Deborah; Whistler, Ken; Pournader, Roozbeh; Moore, Lisa; Liang, Hai (2021-01-14), "3a. Phonetic characters", Recommendations to UTC #166 January 2021 on Script Proposals |
| 14.0 | U+1DF00..1DF07 | 8 | L2/21-009 | | Moore, Lisa (2021-01-27), "B.1 — 3a. Phonetic characters", UTC #166 Minutes |
| 14.0 | U+1DF08..1DF09, 1DF11..1DF18, 1DF1A..1DF1C | 13 | L2/20-125 | | Miller, Kirk (2020-02-21), Unicode request for expected IPA retroflex letters and similar letters with hooks |
| 14.0 | U+1DF08..1DF09, 1DF11..1DF18, 1DF1A..1DF1C | 13 | L2/20-105 | | Anderson, Deborah; Whistler, Ken; Pournader, Roozbeh; Moore, Lisa; Constable, Peter; Liang, Hai (2020-04-20), "1d. Ligature, IPA Retroflex, Hooks and Tails", Recommendations to UTC #163 April 2020 on Script Proposals |
| 14.0 | U+1DF08..1DF09, 1DF11..1DF18, 1DF1A..1DF1C | 13 | L2/20-125R | | Miller, Kirk (2020-07-11), Unicode request for expected IPA retroflex letters and similar letters with hooks |
| 14.0 | U+1DF08..1DF09, 1DF11..1DF18, 1DF1A..1DF1C | 13 | L2/20-169 | | Anderson, Deborah; Whistler, Ken; Pournader, Roozbeh; Moore, Lisa; Constable, Peter; Liang, Hai (2020-07-21), "3d. IPA Retroflex Letters, etc.", Recommendations to UTC #164 July 2020 on Script Proposals |
| 14.0 | U+1DF08..1DF09, 1DF11..1DF18, 1DF1A..1DF1C | 13 | L2/20-172 | | Moore, Lisa (2020-08-03), "Consensus 164-C11", UTC #164 Minutes |
| 14.0 | U+1DF08..1DF09, 1DF11..1DF18, 1DF1A..1DF1C | 13 | L2/20-250 | | Anderson, Deborah; Whistler, Ken; Pournader, Roozbeh; Moore, Lisa; Constable, Peter; Liang, Hai (2020-10-01), "1. Latin", Recommendations to UTC #165 October 2020 on Script Proposals |
| 14.0 | U+1DF08..1DF09, 1DF11..1DF18, 1DF1A..1DF1C | 13 | L2/20-266R | N5148R | Everson, Michael; Miller, Kirk (2020-11-09), Consolidated code chart of proposed phonetic characters |
| 14.0 | U+1DF08..1DF09, 1DF11..1DF18, 1DF1A..1DF1C | 13 | L2/21-021 | | Anderson, Deborah (2020-12-07), Reference doc numbers for L2/20-266R "Consolidated code chart of proposed phonetic characters" and IPA etc. code point and name changes |
| 14.0 | U+1DF08..1DF09, 1DF11..1DF18, 1DF1A..1DF1C | 13 | L2/21-016R | | Anderson, Deborah; Whistler, Ken; Pournader, Roozbeh; Moore, Lisa; Liang, Hai (2021-01-14), "3a. Phonetic characters", Recommendations to UTC #166 January 2021 on Script Proposals |
| 14.0 | U+1DF08..1DF09, 1DF11..1DF18, 1DF1A..1DF1C | 13 | L2/21-009 | | Moore, Lisa (2021-01-27), "B.1 — 3a. Phonetic characters", UTC #166 Minutes |
| 14.0 | U+1DF08..1DF09, 1DF11..1DF18, 1DF1A..1DF1C | 13 | L2/21-066 | | Moore, Lisa (2021-05-05), "Consensus 167-C10", UTC #167 Minutes |
| 14.0 | U+1DF0A..1DF10 | 7 | L2/20-115 | | Miller, Kirk; Sands, Bonny (2020-04-14), Unicode request for additional phonetic click letters |
| 14.0 | U+1DF0A..1DF10 | 7 | L2/20-105 | | Anderson, Deborah; Whistler, Ken; Pournader, Roozbeh; Moore, Lisa; Constable, Peter; Liang, Hai (2020-04-20), "1c. Click-letters", Recommendations to UTC #163 April 2020 on Script Proposals |
| 14.0 | U+1DF0A..1DF10 | 7 | L2/20-115R | | Miller, Kirk; Sands, Bonny (2020-07-10), Unicode request for additional phonetic click letters |
| 14.0 | U+1DF0A..1DF10 | 7 | L2/20-169 | | Anderson, Deborah; Whistler, Ken; Pournader, Roozbeh; Moore, Lisa; Constable, Peter; Liang, Hai (2020-07-21), "3c. Phonetic click letters", Recommendations to UTC #164 July 2020 on Script Proposals |
| 14.0 | U+1DF0A..1DF10 | 7 | L2/20-172 | | Moore, Lisa (2020-08-03), "Consensus 164-C10", UTC #164 Minutes |
| 14.0 | U+1DF0A..1DF10 | 7 | L2/20-250 | | Anderson, Deborah; Whistler, Ken; Pournader, Roozbeh; Moore, Lisa; Constable, Peter; Liang, Hai (2020-10-01), "1. Latin", Recommendations to UTC #165 October 2020 on Script Proposals |
| 14.0 | U+1DF0A..1DF10 | 7 | L2/20-266R | N5148R | Everson, Michael; Miller, Kirk (2020-11-09), Consolidated code chart of proposed phonetic characters |
| 14.0 | U+1DF0A..1DF10 | 7 | L2/21-021 | | Anderson, Deborah (2020-12-07), Reference doc numbers for L2/20-266R "Consolidated code chart of proposed phonetic characters" and IPA etc. code point and name changes |
| 14.0 | U+1DF0A..1DF10 | 7 | L2/21-016R | | Anderson, Deborah; Whistler, Ken; Pournader, Roozbeh; Moore, Lisa; Liang, Hai (2021-01-14), "3a. Phonetic characters", Recommendations to UTC #166 January 2021 on Script Proposals |
| 14.0 | U+1DF0A..1DF10 | 7 | L2/21-009 | | Moore, Lisa (2021-01-27), "B.1 — 3a. Phonetic characters", UTC #166 Minutes |
| 14.0 | U+1DF19 | 1 | L2/20-169 | | Anderson, Deborah; Whistler, Ken; Pournader, Roozbeh; Moore, Lisa; Constable, Peter; Liang, Hai (2020-07-21), "3d. IPA Retroflex Letters, etc.", Recommendations to UTC #164 July 2020 on Script Proposals |
| 14.0 | U+1DF19 | 1 | L2/21-021 | | Anderson, Deborah (2020-12-07), Reference doc numbers for L2/20-266R "Consolidated code chart of proposed phonetic characters" and IPA etc. code point and name changes |
| 14.0 | U+1DF19 | 1 | L2/21-004 | | Miller, Kirk; Everson, Michael (2021-01-03), Unicode request for dezh with retroflex hook |
| 14.0 | U+1DF19 | 1 | L2/21-016R | | Anderson, Deborah; Whistler, Ken; Pournader, Roozbeh; Moore, Lisa; Liang, Hai (2021-01-14), "3i. Dezh with Retroflex Hook", Recommendations to UTC #166 January 2021 on Script Proposals |
| 14.0 | U+1DF19 | 1 | L2/21-009 | | Moore, Lisa (2021-01-27), "B.1 — 3i. Dezh with Retroflex Hook", UTC #166 Minutes |
| 14.0 | U+1DF19 | 1 | L2/21-073 | | Anderson, Deborah; Whistler, Ken; Pournader, Roozbeh; Moore, Lisa; Liang, Hai (2021-04-23), "PRI #428: Names of dezh and tesh digraphs with hooks", Recommendations to UTC #167 April 2021 on Script Proposals |
| 14.0 | U+1DF19 | 1 | L2/21-066 | | Moore, Lisa (2021-05-05), "Consensus 167-C10", UTC #167 Minutes |
| 14.0 | U+1DF1D..1DF1E | 2 | L2/21-041 | | Miller, Kirk (2021-01-11), Unicode request for additional para-IPA letters |
| 14.0 | U+1DF1D..1DF1E | 2 | L2/21-016R | | Anderson, Deborah; Whistler, Ken; Pournader, Roozbeh; Moore, Lisa; Liang, Hai (2021-01-14), "3h. Additional Para-IPA Letters", Recommendations to UTC #166 January 2021 on Script Proposals |
| 14.0 | U+1DF1D..1DF1E | 2 | L2/21-009 | | Moore, Lisa (2021-01-27), "B.1 — 3h. Additional Para-IPA Letters", UTC #166 Minutes |
| 15.0 | U+1DF25..1DF2A | 6 | L2/21-156 | | Miller, Kirk; Rees, Neil (2021-07-16), Unicode request for legacy Malayalam (L2/21-155 [sic]) |
| 15.0 | U+1DF25..1DF2A | 6 | L2/21-174 | | Anderson, Deborah; Whistler, Ken; Pournader, Roozbeh; Liang, Hai (2021-10-01), "1d. Legacy Malayalam (Latin phonetic characters)", Recommendations to UTC #169 October 2021 on Script Proposals |
| 15.0 | U+1DF25..1DF2A | 6 | L2/21-167 | | Cummings, Craig (2022-01-27), "Consensus 169-C6", Approved Minutes of UTC Meeting 169 |
| 15.0 | U+1DF25..1DF2A | 6 | L2/22-023 | | Anderson, Deborah; Whistler, Ken; Pournader, Roozbeh; Constable, Peter (2022-01-22), "21c. Legacy Malayalam Characters", Recommendations to UTC #170 January 2022 on Script Proposals |
| 15.0 | U+1DF25..1DF2A | 6 | L2/22-016 | | Constable, Peter (2022-04-21), "Consensus 170-C18", UTC #170 Minutes, "Modify the names of ... six characters" |
| 18.0 | U+1DF1F..1DF24, 1DF2B..1DF2C | 8 | L2/24-049 | | Unicode support for historical and para-IPA letters, 2024-01-01 |
| 18.0 | U+1DF1F..1DF24, 1DF2B..1DF2C | 8 | L2/24-051 | | Miller, Kirk (2024-02-21), Unicode request for affricate ligatures |
| 18.0 | U+1DF1F..1DF24, 1DF2B..1DF2C | 8 | L2/24-068 | | Anderson, Deborah; Goregaokar, Manish; Kučera, Jan; Whistler, Ken; Pournader, Roozbeh; Constable, Peter (2024-04-18), "10. Affricate ligatures", Recommendations to UTC #179 April 2024 on Script Proposals |
| 18.0 | U+1DF1F..1DF24, 1DF2B..1DF2C | 8 | L2/24-061 | | Constable, Peter (2024-04-29), "Consensus 179-C55", UTC #179 Minutes, "Provisionally assign 8 code points ..." |
| 18.0 | U+1DF1F..1DF24, 1DF2B..1DF2C | 8 | L2/25-226 | | "Consensus 185-C40", UTC #185 Minutes, 2025-10-29, "UTC accepts for encoding in Unicode 18.0 ..." |
| 18.0 | U+1DF2D..1DF3A | 14 | L2/24-050 | | Miller, Kirk (2024-03-28), Unicode request for letters with palatal hook |
| 18.0 | U+1DF2D..1DF3A | 14 | L2/24-068 | | Anderson, Deborah; Goregaokar, Manish; Kučera, Jan; Whistler, Ken; Pournader, Roozbeh; Constable, Peter (2024-04-18), "15. Letters with palatal hook", Recommendations to UTC #179 April 2024 on Script Proposals |
| 18.0 | U+1DF2D..1DF3A | 14 | L2/24-061 | | Constable, Peter (2024-04-29), "Consensus 179-C59", UTC #179 Minutes, "Provisionally assign 14 Latin code points ..." |
| 18.0 | U+1DF2D..1DF3A | 14 | L2/25-226 | | "Consensus 185-C40", UTC #185 Minutes, 2025-10-29, "UTC accepts for encoding in Unicode 18.0 ..." |
| 18.0 | U+1DF3B..1DF3D | 3 | L2/24-049 | | Unicode support for historical and para-IPA letters, 2024-01-01 |
| 18.0 | U+1DF3B..1DF3D | 3 | L2/24-146 | | Miller, Kirk (2024-06-04), Unicode request for Greek letters with palatal hook |
| 18.0 | U+1DF3B..1DF3D | 3 | L2/24-166 | | Anderson, Deborah; Goregaokar, Manish; Kučera, Jan; Whistler, Ken; Pournader, Roozbeh; Constable, Peter (2024-07-18), "14. Phonetic characters", Recommendations to UTC #180 July 2024 on Script Proposals |
| 18.0 | U+1DF3B..1DF3D | 3 | L2/24-159 | | Constable, Peter (2024-07-29), "Consensus 180-C35", UTC #180 Minutes, "Provisionally assign three code points for phonetic characters" |
| 18.0 | U+1DF3B..1DF3D | 3 | L2/24-221 | | Constable, Peter (2024-11-12), "Consensus 181-C45", UTC #181 Minutes, "Change the name of characters provisionally assigned ..." |
| 18.0 | U+1DF3B..1DF3D | 3 | L2/25-226 | | "Consensus 185-C40", UTC #185 Minutes, 2025-10-29, "UTC accepts for encoding in Unicode 18.0 ..." |
| 18.0 | U+1DF3E..1DF3F, 1DFD8..1DFE8 | 19 | L2/24-171 | | Miller, Kirk (2024-06-06), Miscellaneous historical and para-IPA modifier letters |
| 18.0 | U+1DF3E..1DF3F, 1DFD8..1DFE8 | 19 | L2/24-166 | | Anderson, Deborah; Goregaokar, Manish; Kučera, Jan; Whistler, Ken; Pournader, Roozbeh; Constable, Peter (2024-07-18), "16. IPA", Recommendations to UTC #180 July 2024 on Script Proposals |
| 18.0 | U+1DF3E..1DF3F, 1DFD8..1DFE8 | 19 | L2/24-159 | | Constable, Peter (2024-07-29), "Consensus 180-C37", UTC #180 Minutes, "Provisionally assign code points" |
| 18.0 | U+1DF3E..1DF3F, 1DFD8..1DFE8 | 19 | L2/25-226 | | "Consensus 185-C40", UTC #185 Minutes, 2025-10-29, "UTC accepts for encoding in Unicode 18.0 ..." |
| 18.0 | U+1DF40..1DF56, 1DFD2..1DFD7 | 29 | L2/24-234R | | Miller, Kirk; Usher, Timothy; Jacquerye, Denis Moyogo (2024-11-13), Unicode request for barred letters |
| 18.0 | U+1DF40..1DF56, 1DFD2..1DFD7 | 29 | L2/24-228 | | Kučera, Jan; et al. (2024-11-01), "2.6 Phonetic", Recommendations to UTC #181 (November 2024) on Script Proposals |
| 18.0 | U+1DF40..1DF56, 1DFD2..1DFD7 | 29 | L2/24-221 | | Constable, Peter (2024-11-12), "Consensus 181-C33", UTC #181 Minutes, "Provisionally assign 23 code points ..." |
| 18.0 | U+1DF40..1DF56, 1DFD2..1DFD7 | 29 | L2/25-097 | | Miller, Kirk (2025-03-03), Response to feedback on the names of phonetic characters in L2/24-234R and L2/25-016 |
| 18.0 | U+1DF40..1DF56, 1DFD2..1DFD7 | 29 | L2/25-085 | | Leroy, Robin (2025-04-28), "Consensus 183-C20", UTC #183 Minutes, "Change the name of [...] code points provisionally assigned ..." |
| 18.0 | U+1DF40..1DF56, 1DFD2..1DFD7 | 29 | L2/25-226 | | "Consensus 185-C40", UTC #185 Minutes, 2025-10-29, "UTC accepts for encoding in Unicode 18.0 ..." |
| 18.0 | U+1DF57..1DF59, 1DFCD..1DFCF | 6 | L2/25-016 | | Miller, Kirk (2024-11-15), Unicode request for letters of the RFE phonetic alphabet |
| 18.0 | U+1DF57..1DF59, 1DFCD..1DFCF | 6 | L2/25-010 | | Kučera, Jan; et al. (2025-01-16), "1.7 RFE letters", Recommendations to UTC #182 (January 2025) on Script Proposals |
| 18.0 | U+1DF57..1DF59, 1DFCD..1DFCF | 6 | L2/25-003 | | Leroy, Robin (2025-01-28), "Consensus 182-C8", UTC #182 Minutes, "Provisionally assign ..." |
| 18.0 | U+1DF57..1DF59, 1DFCD..1DFCF | 6 | L2/25-097 | | Miller, Kirk (2025-03-03), Response to feedback on the names of phonetic characters in L2/24-234R and L2/25-016 |
| 18.0 | U+1DF57..1DF59, 1DFCD..1DFCF | 6 | L2/25-091R | | Kučera, Jan; et al. (2025-04-22), "3.6 Names for phonetic characters", Recommendations to UTC #183 (April 2025) on Script Proposals |
| 18.0 | U+1DF57..1DF59, 1DFCD..1DFCF | 6 | L2/25-085 | | Leroy, Robin (2025-04-28), "Consensus 183-C20", UTC #183 Minutes, "Change the name of [...] code points provisionally assigned ..." |
| 18.0 | U+1DF57..1DF59, 1DFCD..1DFCF | 6 | L2/25-226 | | "Consensus 185-C40", UTC #185 Minutes, 2025-10-29, "UTC accepts for encoding in Unicode 18.0 ..." |
| 18.0 | U+1DF5A..1DF66 | 13 | L2/08-428 | N3555 | Everson, Michael (2008-11-27), Exploratory proposal to encode Germanicist, Nordicist, and other phonetic characters in the UCS |
| 18.0 | U+1DF5A..1DF66 | 13 | L2/22-286 | | Manulov, Nikita (2022-11-12), Proposal to Encode Latin characters for Initial Teaching Alphabet |
| 18.0 | U+1DF5A..1DF66 | 13 | L2/23-012 | | Anderson, Deborah; et al. (2023-01-17), "14 Latin", Recommendations to UTC #174 January 2023 on Script Proposals |
| 18.0 | U+1DF5A..1DF66 | 13 | L2/23-083 | | Anderson, Deborah; Kučera, Jan; Whistler, Ken; Pournader, Roozbeh; Constable, Peter (2023-04-21), "14a Initial Teaching Alphabet", Recommendations to UTC #175 April 2023 on Script Proposals |
| 18.0 | U+1DF5A..1DF66 | 13 | L2/23-102R | | Miller, Kirk (2023-04-22), Unicode request for Initial Teaching Alphabet |
| 18.0 | U+1DF5A..1DF66 | 13 | L2/24-068 | | Anderson, Deborah; Goregaokar, Manish; Kučera, Jan; Whistler, Ken; Pournader, Roozbeh; Constable, Peter (2024-04-18), "22. Feedback on Alpha: ITA", Recommendations to UTC #179 April 2024 on Script Proposals |
| 18.0 | U+1DF5A..1DF66 | 13 | L2/24-273 | | Miller, Kirk (2024-12-13), Unicode request for Initial Teaching Alphabet |
| 18.0 | U+1DF5A..1DF66 | 13 | L2/25-010 | | Kučera, Jan; et al. (2025-01-16), "1.5 Character additions for Initial Teaching Alphabet", Recommendations to UTC #182 (January 2025) on Script Proposals |
| 18.0 | U+1DF5A..1DF66 | 13 | L2/25-003 | | Leroy, Robin (2025-01-28), "Consensus 182-C6", UTC #182 Minutes, "Provisionally assign 13 code points ..." |
| 18.0 | U+1DF5A..1DF66 | 13 | L2/25-226 | | "Consensus 185-C40", UTC #185 Minutes, 2025-10-29, "UTC accepts for encoding in Unicode 18.0 ..." |
| 18.0 | U+1DF67 | 1 | L2/24-272 | | Miller, Kirk (2024-12-13), Unicode request for lezh with curl |
| 18.0 | U+1DF67 | 1 | L2/25-010 | | Kučera, Jan; et al. (2025-01-16), "1.8 Phonetic", Recommendations to UTC #182 (January 2025) on Script Proposals |
| 18.0 | U+1DF67 | 1 | L2/25-003 | | Leroy, Robin (2025-01-28), "Consensus 182-C9", UTC #182 Minutes, "Provisionally assign ..." |
| 18.0 | U+1DF67 | 1 | L2/25-226 | | "Consensus 185-C40", UTC #185 Minutes, 2025-10-29, "UTC accepts for encoding in Unicode 18.0 ..." |
| 18.0 | U+1DF68..1DF81 | 26 | L2/10-229R | | Pentzlin, Karl (2010-08-04), Proposal to encode characters for the English Phonotypic Alphabet (EPA) in the UCS |
| 18.0 | U+1DF68..1DF81 | 26 | L2/10-403 | | Pentzlin, Karl (2010-10-24), Proposal to encode characters for the English Phonotypic Alphabet (EPA) in the UCS |
| 18.0 | U+1DF68..1DF81 | 26 | L2/11-040 | N3981 | Revised Proposal to encode characters for the English Phonotypic Alphabet (EPA) in the UCS, 2011-02-02 |
| 18.0 | U+1DF68..1DF81 | 26 | L2/11-153 | | Pentzlin, Karl (2011-05-04), Second Revised Proposal to encode characters for the English Phonotypic Alphabet (EPA) in the UCS |
| 18.0 | U+1DF68..1DF81 | 26 | L2/11-225 | N4079R | Pentzlin, Karl (2011-05-23), Second Revised Proposal to encode characters for the English Phonotypic Alphabet (EPA) in the UCS |
| 18.0 | U+1DF68..1DF81 | 26 | L2/24-136 | N5269 | Pentzlin, Karl (2024-06-05), Fourth Revised Proposal to encode characters for the English Phonotypic Alphabet (EPA) in the UCS |
| 18.0 | U+1DF68..1DF81 | 26 | L2/24-166 | | Anderson, Deborah; Goregaokar, Manish; Kučera, Jan; Whistler, Ken; Pournader, Roozbeh; Constable, Peter (2024-07-18), "30", Recommendations to UTC #180 July 2024 on Script Proposals |
| 18.0 | U+1DF68..1DF81 | 26 | L2/25-010 | | Kučera, Jan; et al. (2025-01-16), "1.6 English Phonotypic Alphabet", Recommendations to UTC #182 (January 2025) on Script Proposals |
| 18.0 | U+1DF68..1DF81 | 26 | L2/25-003 | | Leroy, Robin (2025-01-28), "Consensus 182-C7", UTC #182 Minutes, "Provisionally assign ..." |
| 18.0 | U+1DF68..1DF81 | 26 | L2/25-226 | | "Consensus 185-C40", UTC #185 Minutes, 2025-10-29, "UTC accepts for encoding in Unicode 18.0 ..." |
| 18.0 | U+1DF68..1DF81 | 26 | L2/26-010 | | Kučera, Jan; Anderson, Deborah; Constable, Peter; Pournader, Roozbeh (2026-01-19), "4.2 EPA names consistency [Affects U+1DF7E]", Recommendations to UTC #186 (January 2026) on Script Proposals |
| 18.0 | U+1DF68..1DF81 | 26 | L2/26-003 | | "Consensus 186-C27", UTC #186 Minutes, 2026-02-01, "Change the name of U+1DF7E [...] from LATIN CAPITAL LETTER REVERSED ENLARGED SMALL U, to LATIN CAPITAL LETTER REVERSED U" |
| 18.0 | U+1DF90..1DF96 | 7 | L2/24-244 | | Mayer, Uwe; et al. (2024-09-17), Proposal to encode 11 cossic characters |
| 18.0 | U+1DF90..1DF96 | 7 | L2/24-228 | | Kučera, Jan; et al. (2024-11-01), "3.5 Cossic characters", Recommendations to UTC #181 (November 2024) on Script Proposals |
| 18.0 | U+1DF90..1DF96 | 7 | L2/25-123 | | Mayer, Uwe; et al. (2025-03-24), Proposal to encode 11 cossic characters |
| 18.0 | U+1DF90..1DF96 | 7 | L2/25-091R | | Kučera, Jan; et al. (2025-04-22), "5.12 Leibniz", Recommendations to UTC #183 (April 2025) on Script Proposals |
| 18.0 | U+1DF90..1DF96 | 7 | | N5333 | Mayer, Uwe; et al. (2025-05-13), Proposal to encode 12 cossic characters |
| 18.0 | U+1DF90..1DF96 | 7 | | N5333R | Mayer, Uwe; et al. (2025-09-30), Proposal to encode 12 cossic characters |
| 18.0 | U+1DF90..1DF96 | 7 | L2/25-232R | | Kučera, Jan; Pournader, Roozbeh; Anderson, Deborah; Leroy, Robin; Goregaokar, Manish (2025-10-27), "2.7 Leibniz", Recommendations to UTC #185 (October 2025) on Script Proposals |
| 18.0 | U+1DF90..1DF96 | 7 | | N5333R2 | Mayer, Uwe; et al. (2025-11-25), Proposal to encode 12 cossic characters |
| 18.0 | U+1DF90..1DF96 | 7 | L2/26-054R2 | | Anderson, Debbie; Constable, Peter (2026-01-22), "2. Cossic characters", Proposed Leibniz additions for Unicode 18.0 |
| 18.0 | U+1DF90..1DF96 | 7 | L2/26-003 | | "Consensus 186-C31", UTC #186 Minutes, 2026-02-01, "UTC accepts [...] Cossic characters for encoding in Unicode 18.0 ..." |
| 18.0 | U+1DF90..1DF96 | 7 | L2/26-115 | | Jacquerye, Denis Moyogo (2026-03-31), Alpha Feedback on Cossic characters (N5333R2) |
| 18.0 | U+1DF90..1DF96 | 7 | L2/26-116 | | Mayer, Uwe; et al. (2026-04-07), Work group reply to Alpha Feedback on Cossic characters by D. M. Jacquerye (31. 3. 2026) |
| 18.0 | U+1DF90..1DF96 | 7 | L2/26-100 | | Kučera, Jan; Anderson, Deborah; Pournader, Roozbeh (2026-04-17), Recommendations to UTC #187 (April 2026) on Script Proposals |
| 18.0 | U+1DF90..1DF96 | 7 | L2/26-093 | | "Consensus 187-C15", UTC #187 meeting minutes, 2026-04-29, "Change the names of [...] three cossic characters ..." |
| 18.0 | U+1DFD0 | 1 | L2/24-219 | | Miller, Kirk (2024-10-18), Unicode request for subscript w y z and ɣ |
| 18.0 | U+1DFD0 | 1 | L2/24-228 | | Kučera, Jan; et al. (2024-11-01), "2.8 Phonetic", Recommendations to UTC #181 (November 2024) on Script Proposals |
| 18.0 | U+1DFD0 | 1 | L2/24-221 | | Constable, Peter (2024-11-12), "Consensus 181-C35", UTC #181 Minutes, "Provisionally assign ..." |
| 18.0 | U+1DFD0 | 1 | L2/25-226 | | "Consensus 185-C40", UTC #185 Minutes, 2025-10-29, "UTC accepts for encoding in Unicode 18.0 ..." |
| 18.0 | U+1DFD1 | 1 | L2/24-231 | | Miller, Kirk; Jacquerye, Denis Moyogo (2024-10-18), Unicode request for modifier small capital P |
| 18.0 | U+1DFD1 | 1 | L2/24-228 | | Kučera, Jan; et al. (2024-11-01), "2.9 Phonetic", Recommendations to UTC #181 (November 2024) on Script Proposals |
| 18.0 | U+1DFD1 | 1 | L2/24-221 | | Constable, Peter (2024-11-12), "Consensus 181-C36", UTC #181 Minutes, "Provisionally assign ..." |
| 18.0 | U+1DFD1 | 1 | L2/25-226 | | "Consensus 185-C40", UTC #185 Minutes, 2025-10-29, "UTC accepts for encoding in Unicode 18.0 ..." |
| 18.0 | U+1DFE9..1DFF2 | 10 | L2/24-049 | | Unicode support for historical and para-IPA letters, 2024-01-01 |
| 18.0 | U+1DFE9..1DFF2 | 10 | L2/24-147 | | Miller, Kirk (2024-06-14), Modifier Sinological extensions to the IPA |
| 18.0 | U+1DFE9..1DFF2 | 10 | L2/24-166 | | Anderson, Deborah; Goregaokar, Manish; Kučera, Jan; Whistler, Ken; Pournader, Roozbeh; Constable, Peter (2024-07-18), "15. IPA", Recommendations to UTC #180 July 2024 on Script Proposals |
| 18.0 | U+1DFE9..1DFF2 | 10 | L2/24-159 | | Constable, Peter (2024-07-29), "Consensus 180-C36", UTC #180 Minutes, "Provisionally assign ten modifier letter code points ..." |
| 18.0 | U+1DFE9..1DFF2 | 10 | L2/25-226 | | "Consensus 185-C40", UTC #185 Minutes, 2025-10-29, "UTC accepts for encoding in Unicode 18.0 ..." |
| 18.0 | U+1DFF3..1DFF4 | 2 | L2/24-145R | | Miller, Kirk (2024-06-24), Unicode request for modifier psi and omega |
| 18.0 | U+1DFF3..1DFF4 | 2 | L2/24-159 | | Constable, Peter (2024-07-29), "Consensus 180-C34", UTC #180 Minutes, "Provisionally assign two modifier letter code points ..." |
| 18.0 | U+1DFF3..1DFF4 | 2 | L2/25-226 | | "Consensus 185-C40", UTC #185 Minutes, 2025-10-29, "UTC accepts for encoding in Unicode 18.0 ..." |
| 18.0 | U+1DFF5..1DFFF | 11 | L2/24-049 | | Unicode support for historical and para-IPA letters, 2024-01-01 |
| 18.0 | U+1DFF5..1DFFF | 11 | L2/24-144 | | Miller, Kirk (2024-04-30), Unicode request for modifier letters with palatal hook |
| 18.0 | U+1DFF5..1DFFF | 11 | L2/24-166 | | Anderson, Deborah; Goregaokar, Manish; Kučera, Jan; Whistler, Ken; Pournader, Roozbeh; Constable, Peter (2024-07-18), "12. Phonetic characters", Recommendations to UTC #180 July 2024 on Script Proposals |
| 18.0 | U+1DFF5..1DFFF | 11 | L2/24-159 | | Constable, Peter (2024-07-29), "Consensus 180-C33", UTC #180 Minutes, "Provisionally assign 5 phonetic modifier letter code points ..." |
| 18.0 | U+1DFF5..1DFFF | 11 | L2/25-226 | | "Consensus 185-C40", UTC #185 Minutes, 2025-10-29, "UTC accepts for encoding in Unicode 18.0 ..." |

== See also ==
- Latin script in Unicode
- Greek alphabet in Unicode
