= Phonetic Extensions =

- Range: U+1D00..U+1D7F (128 code points)
- Plane: BMP
- Scripts: Cyrillic (2 char.); Greek (15 char.); Latin (111 char.)
- Major alphabets: UPA; Dictionary usage
- Assigned: 128 code points
- Unused: 0 reserved code points

Unicode Version History
- 4.0 (2003): 108 (+108)
- 4.1 (2005): 128 (+20)

Unicode documentation
- Code chart ∣ Web page

Phonetic Extensions is a Unicode block containing phonetic characters used in the Uralic Phonetic Alphabet, Old Irish phonetic notation, the Oxford English Dictionary and American dictionaries, and Americanist and Russianist phonetic notations. Its character set is continued in the following Unicode block, Phonetic Extensions Supplement.

== Block ==
Phonetic Extensions^{[1]} Official Unicode Consortium code chart (PDF)
	0	1	2	3	4	5	6	7	8	9	A	B	C	D	E	F
U+1D0x	ᴀ	ᴁ	ᴂ	ᴃ	ᴄ	ᴅ	ᴆ	ᴇ	ᴈ	ᴉ	ᴊ	ᴋ	ᴌ	ᴍ	ᴎ	ᴏ
U+1D1x	ᴐ	ᴑ	ᴒ	ᴓ	ᴔ	ᴕ	ᴖ	ᴗ	ᴘ	ᴙ	ᴚ	ᴛ	ᴜ	ᴝ	ᴞ	ᴟ
U+1D2x	ᴠ	ᴡ	ᴢ	ᴣ	ᴤ	ᴥ	ᴦ	ᴧ	ᴨ	ᴩ	ᴪ	ᴫ	ᴬ	ᴭ	ᴮ	ᴯ
U+1D3x	ᴰ	ᴱ	ᴲ	ᴳ	ᴴ	ᴵ	ᴶ	ᴷ	ᴸ	ᴹ	ᴺ	ᴻ	ᴼ	ᴽ	ᴾ	ᴿ
U+1D4x	ᵀ	ᵁ	ᵂ	ᵃ	ᵄ	ᵅ	ᵆ	ᵇ	ᵈ	ᵉ	ᵊ	ᵋ	ᵌ	ᵍ	ᵎ	ᵏ
U+1D5x	ᵐ	ᵑ	ᵒ	ᵓ	ᵔ	ᵕ	ᵖ	ᵗ	ᵘ	ᵙ	ᵚ	ᵛ	ᵜ	ᵝ	ᵞ	ᵟ
U+1D6x	ᵠ	ᵡ	ᵢ	ᵣ	ᵤ	ᵥ	ᵦ	ᵧ	ᵨ	ᵩ	ᵪ	ᵫ	ᵬ	ᵭ	ᵮ	ᵯ
U+1D7x	ᵰ	ᵱ	ᵲ	ᵳ	ᵴ	ᵵ	ᵶ	ᵷ	ᵸ	ᵹ	ᵺ	ᵻ	ᵼ	ᵽ	ᵾ	ᵿ
Notes 1.As of Unicode version 17.0

== History ==
The following Unicode-related documents record the purpose and process of defining specific characters in the Phonetic Extensions block:

Version	Final code points (Note: Proposed code points and characters names may differ from final code points and names)	Count	L2 ID	WG2 ID	Document
4.0	U+1D00..1D6A	107	L2/02-141	N2419	Everson, Michael; et al. (2002-03-20), Uralic Phonetic Alphabet characters for the UCS
4.0	U+1D00..1D6A	107	L2/02-192		Everson, Michael (2002-05-02), Everson's Reply on UPA
4.0	U+1D00..1D6A	107		N2442	Everson, Michael; Kolehmainen, Erkki I.; Ruppel, Klaas; Trosterud, Trond (2002-05-21), Justification for placing the Uralic Phonetic Alphabet in the BMP
4.0	U+1D00..1D6A	107	L2/02-291		Whistler, Ken (2002-05-31), WG2 report from Dublin
4.0	U+1D00..1D6A	107	L2/02-292		Whistler, Ken (2002-06-03), Early look at WG2 consent docket
4.0	U+1D00..1D6A	107	L2/02-166R2		Moore, Lisa (2002-08-09), "Scripts and New Characters - UPA", UTC #91 Minutes
4.0	U+1D00..1D6A	107	L2/02-253		Moore, Lisa (2002-10-21), "Consensus 92-C2", UTC #92 Minutes
4.0	U+1D00..1D6A	107	L2/11-043		Freytag, Asmus; Karlsson, Kent (2011-02-02), Proposal to correct mistakes and inconsistencies in certain property assignments for super and subscripted letters
4.0	U+1D00..1D6A	107	L2/11-016		Moore, Lisa (2011-02-15), "Correct mistakes in property assignments for super and subscripted letters (B.13.4) [U+1D62..1D6A]", UTC #126 / L2 #223 Minutes
4.0	U+1D00..1D6A	107	L2/11-160		PRI #181 Changing General Category of Twelve Characters, 2011-05-02
4.0	U+1D6B	1	L2/02-421	N2514	Everson, Michael (2002-11-10), Proposal to encode one Latin letter in the UCS
4.1	U+1D6C..1D76	11	L2/03-174R2	N2632	Constable, Peter (2003-09-30), Proposal to Encode Phonetic Symbols with Middle Tilde in the UCS
4.1	U+1D6C..1D76	11	L2/03-240R3		Moore, Lisa (2003-10-21), "Eleven Phonetic Symbols with Middle Tilde (B.14.15)", UTC #96 Minutes
4.1	U+1D6C..1D76	11	L2/04-132	N2740	Constable, Peter (2004-04-19), Proposal to add additional phonetic characters to the UCS
4.1	U+1D77..1D78	2	L2/99-082	N1962	Everson, Michael (1999-02-26), Optimizing Georgian representation in the BMP of the UCS
4.1	U+1D77..1D78	2	L2/00-115R2		Moore, Lisa (2000-08-08), Minutes Of UTC Meeting #83
4.1	U+1D77..1D78	2	L2/03-230R2	N2608R2	Everson, Michael (2003-09-04), Proposal to add Georgian and other characters to the BMP of the UCS
4.1	U+1D79	1	L2/03-331	N2641	Everson, Michael (2003-10-05), Proposal to encode one Irish phonetic letter in the UCS
4.1	U+1D7A	1	L2/02-361		Davis, Mark (2002-09-05), Double Combining Stroke
4.1	U+1D7A	1	L2/03-136		Moore, Lisa (2003-08-18), "Scripts and New Characters - Double Combining Stroke", UTC #95 Minutes
4.1	U+1D7A	1	L2/03-334	N2645	Davis, Mark (2003-10-08), Latin Small Letter th with Strikethrough
4.1	U+1D7A	1	L2/03-359	N2656	Freytag, Asmus (2003-10-15), Phonetic symbols used in Dictionaries
4.1	U+1D7A	1	L2/03-356R2		Moore, Lisa (2003-10-22), "Phonetic symbols used in dictionaries (B.14.15)", UTC #97 Minutes
4.1	U+1D7B..1D7F	5	L2/03-170		Constable, Peter (2003-05-30), Proposal to Encode Phonetic Symbols with Retroflex Hook in the UCS
4.1	U+1D7B..1D7F	5	L2/03-169R		Constable, Peter (2003-06-06), Proposal to Encode Phonetic Symbols with Palatal Hook in the UCS
4.1	U+1D7B..1D7F	5	L2/03-180		Constable, Peter (2003-06-07), Proposal to Encode Additional Phonetic Modifier Letters in the UCS
4.1	U+1D7B..1D7F	5	L2/03-190R		Constable, Peter (2003-06-08), Proposal to Encode Additional Phonetic Symbols in the UCS
4.1	U+1D7B..1D7F	5	L2/03-136		Moore, Lisa (2003-08-18), "Phonetic Symbols and Modifier Letters", UTC #95 Minutes
4.1	U+1D7B..1D7F	5	L2/04-044		Constable, Peter (2004-02-01), Revised Proposal to Encode Additional Phonetic Modifier Letters in the UCS
4.1	U+1D7B..1D7F	5	L2/04-045		Constable, Peter (2004-02-01), Revised Proposal to Encode Phonetic Symbols with Palatal Hook in the UCS
4.1	U+1D7B..1D7F	5	L2/04-046		Constable, Peter (2004-02-01), Revised Proposal to Encode Phonetic Symbols with Retroflex Hook in the UCS
4.1	U+1D7B..1D7F	5	L2/04-047		Constable, Peter (2004-02-01), Revised Proposal to Encode Additional Phonetic Symbols in the UCS
4.1	U+1D7B..1D7F	5	L2/04-132	N2740	Constable, Peter (2004-04-19), Proposal to add additional phonetic characters to the UCS
4.1	U+1D7B..1D7F	5	L2/04-144		Hallissy, Bob (2004-04-27), Soft-dotted characters in the pipeline
4.1	U+1D7B..1D7F	5	L2/04-003R		Moore, Lisa (2004-05-17), "Phonetic Modifier Letters (B.14.10), Phonetic Symbols with Palatal Hook (B.14.11), Phonetic Symbols with Retroflex Hook (B.14.12), and Additional Phonetic Symbols (B.14.13)", UTC #98 Minutes

== See also ==
- Cyrillic script in Unicode
- Greek alphabet in Unicode
- Latin script in Unicode
