= Cyrillic Extended-D =

- Range: U+1E030..U+1E08F (96 code points)
- Plane: SMP
- Scripts: Cyrillic
- Assigned: 63 code points
- Unused: 33 reserved code points

Unicode Version History
- 15.0 (2022): 63 (+63)

Unicode documentation
- Code chart ∣ Web page

Cyrillic Extended-D is a Unicode block containing superscript and subscript Cyrillic characters used in Cyrillic-based phonetic transcription, as well as a combining character. The block contains the first Cyrillic characters defined outside of the Basic Multilingual Plane (BMP).

== Block ==
Cyrillic Extended-D^{[1]}^{[2]} Official Unicode Consortium code chart (PDF)
	0	1	2	3	4	5	6	7	8	9	A	B	C	D	E	F
U+1E03x	𞀰	𞀱	𞀲	𞀳	𞀴	𞀵	𞀶	𞀷	𞀸	𞀹	𞀺	𞀻	𞀼	𞀽	𞀾	𞀿
U+1E04x	𞁀	𞁁	𞁂	𞁃	𞁄	𞁅	𞁆	𞁇	𞁈	𞁉	𞁊	𞁋	𞁌	𞁍	𞁎	𞁏
U+1E05x	𞁐	𞁑	𞁒	𞁓	𞁔	𞁕	𞁖	𞁗	𞁘	𞁙	𞁚	𞁛	𞁜	𞁝	𞁞	𞁟
U+1E06x	𞁠	𞁡	𞁢	𞁣	𞁤	𞁥	𞁦	𞁧	𞁨	𞁩	𞁪	𞁫	𞁬	𞁭		
U+1E07x																
U+1E08x																◌𞂏
Notes 1.As of Unicode version 17.0 2.Grey areas indicate non-assigned code points

== History ==
The following Unicode-related documents record the purpose and process of defining specific characters in the Cyrillic Extended-D block:

Version	Final code points (Note: Proposed code points and characters names may differ from final code points and names)	Count	L2 ID	Document
15.0	U+1E030..1E06D, 1E08F	63	L2/21-107	Miller, Kirk (2021-06-07), Unicode request for Cyrillic modifier letters
15.0	U+1E030..1E06D, 1E08F	63	L2/21-142	Miller, Kirk (2021-06-25), Addendum to L2/21-107, Cyrillic modifier letters
15.0	U+1E030..1E06D, 1E08F	63	L2/21-130	Anderson, Deborah; Whistler, Ken; Pournader, Roozbeh; Liang, Hai (2021-07-26), "1. Cyrillic", Recommendations to UTC #168 July 2021 on Script Proposals
15.0	U+1E030..1E06D, 1E08F	63	L2/21-123	Cummings, Craig (2021-08-03), "B.1 Section 1, Cyrillic", Draft Minutes of UTC Meeting 168
15.0	U+1E030..1E06D, 1E08F	63	L2/22-010	Miller, Kirk (2022-01-07), Addendum II to L2/21-107, Cyrillic modifier letters
15.0	U+1E030..1E06D, 1E08F	63	L2/22-023	Anderson, Deborah; Whistler, Ken; Pournader, Roozbeh; Constable, Peter (2022-01-22), "1b. Cyrillic Modifier Letters", Recommendations to UTC #170 January 2022 on Script Proposals
15.0	U+1E030..1E06D, 1E08F	63	L2/22-016	Constable, Peter (2022-04-21), "D.1 1b Cyrillic Modifier Letters", UTC #170 Minutes
