= Cyrillic Extended-A =

- Range: U+2DE0..U+2DFF (32 code points)
- Plane: BMP
- Scripts: Cyrillic
- Major alphabets: Old Church Slavonic
- Assigned: 32 code points
- Unused: 0 reserved code points

Unicode version history
- 5.1 (2008): 32 (+32)

Unicode documentation
- Code chart ∣ Web page

Cyrillic Extended-A is a Unicode block containing Cyrillic combining characters used in Old Church Slavonic texts.

== Block ==
Cyrillic Extended-A^{[1]} Official Unicode Consortium code chart (PDF)
	0	1	2	3	4	5	6	7	8	9	A	B	C	D	E	F
U+2DEx	ⷠ	ⷡ	ⷢ	ⷣ	ⷤ	ⷥ	ⷦ	ⷧ	ⷨ	ⷩ	ⷪ	ⷫ	ⷬ	ⷭ	ⷮ	ⷯ
U+2DFx	ⷰ	ⷱ	ⷲ	ⷳ	ⷴ	ⷵ	ⷶ	ⷷ	ⷸ	ⷹ	ⷺ	ⷻ	ⷼ	ⷽ	ⷾ	ⷿ
Notes: 1. As of Unicode version 16.0

== History ==
The following Unicode-related documents record the purpose and process of defining specific characters in the Cyrillic Extended-A block:

Version	Final code points (Note: Proposed code points and characters names may differ from final code points and names)	Count	L2 ID	WG2 ID	Document
5.1	U+2DE0..2DF5	22	L2/06-172	N3097	Kryukov, Alexey; Dorosh, Vladislav (2006-01-30), Proposal to add old Cyrillic titlo-letters to the UCS
5.1	U+2DE0..2DF5	22	L2/06-108		Moore, Lisa (2006-05-25), "Consensus 107-C38", UTC #107 Minutes
5.1	U+2DE0..2DF5	22		N3103 (pdf, doc)	Umamaheswaran, V. S. (2006-08-25), "M48.8.26", Unconfirmed minutes of WG 2 meeting 48, Mountain View, CA, USA; 2006-04-24/27
5.1	U+2DE0..2DF5	22		N3153 (pdf, doc)	Umamaheswaran, V. S. (2007-02-16), "M49.13", Unconfirmed minutes of WG 2 meeting 49 AIST, Akihabara, Tokyo, Japan; 2006-09-25/29
5.1	U+2DE0..2DF5	22	L2/06-324R2		Moore, Lisa (2006-11-29), "Consensus 109-C4", UTC #109 Minutes
5.1	U+2DE0..2DF5	22	L2/15-002		Andreev, Aleksandr; Shardt, Yuri; Simmons, Nikita (2015-01-12), Request for Clarification in the Encoding Model for Some Cyrillic Combining Characters
5.1	U+2DE0..2DF5	22	L2/15-014		Andreev, Aleksandr; Shardt, Yuri; Simmons, Nikita (2015-01-26), Proposal to Change Annotations on Some Cyrillic Characters
5.1	U+2DE0..2DF5	22	L2/15-017		Moore, Lisa (2015-02-12), "C.4.1", UTC #142 Minutes
5.1	U+2DE0..2DF5	22	L2/15-182		Whistler, Ken (2015-07-20), Suggested Responses to Suggestions re Cyrillic in L2/15-014
5.1	U+2DF6..2DFF	10	L2/06-042		Cleminson, Ralph (2006-01-26), Proposal for additional Cyrillic characters
5.1	U+2DF6..2DFF	10	L2/06-181		Anderson, Deborah (2006-05-08), Responses to the UTC regarding L2/06-042, Proposal for Additional Cyrillic Characters
5.1	U+2DF6..2DFF	10	L2/06-359		Cleminson, Ralph (2006-10-31), Proposal for additional Cyrillic characters
5.1	U+2DF6..2DFF	10	L2/07-003	N3194	Everson, Michael; Birnbaum, David; Cleminson, Ralph; Derzhanski, Ivan; Dorosh, Vladislav; Kryukov, Alexey; Paliga, Sorin; Ruppel, Klaas (2007-01-12), Proposal to encode additional Cyrillic characters in the BMP of the UCS
5.1	U+2DF6..2DFF	10	L2/07-055		Cleminson, Ralph (2007-01-19), Comments on Additional Cyrillic Characters (L2/07-003 = WG2 N3194)
5.1	U+2DF6..2DFF	10	L2/07-015		Moore, Lisa (2007-02-08), "Cyrillic (C.13)", UTC #110 Minutes
5.1	U+2DF6..2DFF	10	L2/07-268	N3253 (pdf, doc)	Umamaheswaran, V. S. (2007-07-26), "M50.11", Unconfirmed minutes of WG 2 meeting 50, Frankfurt-am-Main, Germany; 2007-04-24/27
