= Andika (typeface) =

- Category: Sans-serif
- Designer: Victor Gaultney
- Commissioned by: SIL International
- Date released: 2008
- License: SIL Open Font License
- Variations: Andika, Andika Compact, Andika New Basic,
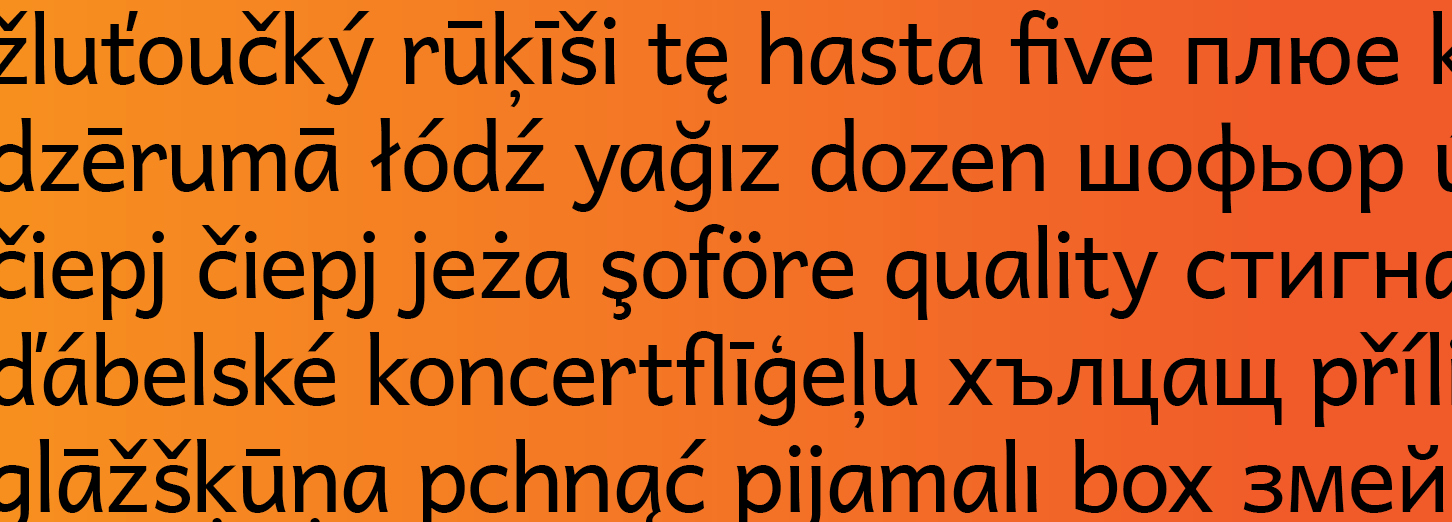
- Sample
- Website: software.sil.org/andika/

Andika (/ænˈdiːkə/, from the verb root for 'to write' in Swahili) is a sans-serif typeface developed by SIL International for the Latin and Cyrillic scripts. It is designed for literacy programs and beginning readers, but also has support for IPA transcription and a large number of diacritics. The font offers four family members: roman, bold, italic and bold italic.

Andika supports OpenType and AAT technologies for advanced rendering features. It is licensed under the SIL Open Font License (OFL), and can be downloaded free of charge.

Version 6.2 of the font includes over 3,800 glyphs, including stylistic variants and ligatures. Stylistic variants include alternate forms of letters such as a, g and t and the digit 4. The Andika New Basic variant has a reduced number of characters and a significantly smaller file size.

Font selection for Andika with the font stylistic set ss01 (double-story 'a' and 'g') in LibreOffice.

Font selection for Andika with font features selected (character variants cv31 and cv39) in LibreOffice.

Variant forms of many characters can be chosen in supporting word-processors. For example, in LibreOffice, for double-story a and double-story g, append ss01=1 to the name of the font in the font-selection window. (Features are appended with a colon and linked with an ampersand.) Alternatively, customized versions of the fonts can be created with TypeTuner, prior to download, that have those forms preset. Features that may be chosen include double-story 'a', double-story 'g', open-top '4', barred '7', 'i' and 'l' with a bottom curl, variant forms of capital 'Ŋ', capital 'Q' with a crossing tail, straight-stem 't', 'y' with a straight tail, Vietnamese-style diacritics, Serbian-style italics in Cyrillic, staveless tone letters, slashed zero, and automatic fractions.
