= Turned h with stroke =

Letter of the Latin alphabet

Usage
- Writing system: Latin script
- Type: alphabetic
- Language of origin: Abkhaz, Abaza
- Sound values: [t͡ʃʼ], [t͡ɕʼ]
- Alphabetical position: 15th (Abkhaz), 14th (Abaza)

History
- Development: Ɥ ɥ
- Time period: 1930s
- Transliterations: Ꚓ, Ҷ, ЧӀ

Turned H with stroke or turned h with stroke at descender is a letter of the Latin script which was used in the orthographies of the Abkhaz and the Abaza languages.

== Usage ==
Turned H with stroke was used in the Abkhaz Latin alphabet of Yakovlev in 1930.

Abkhaz Latin alphabet of 1930.

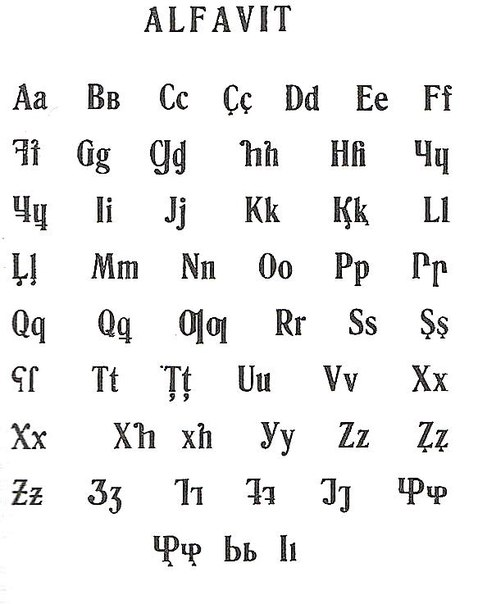
Abaza Latin alphabet of 1932.

== Computing codes ==
This letter has not been encoded in Unicode.

== Sources ==
- Joomagueldinov, Nurlan; Pentzlin, Karl; Yevlampiev, Ilya (18 October 2011). Proposal to encode Latin letters used in the Former Soviet Union (PDF).

== See also ==
- Abkhaz language
- Abkhaz alphabet
- Latin script
