= Abkhaz phonology =

Phonology of the Abkhaz language

Abkhaz is a language of the Northwest Caucasian family which, like the other Northwest Caucasian languages, is very rich in consonants. Abkhaz has a large consonantal inventory that contrasts 58 consonants in the literary Abzhywa dialect, coupled with just two phonemic vowels (Chirikba 2003:18–20).

Abkhaz has three major dialects: Abzhywa, Bzyp and Sadz, which differ mainly in phonology, with the lexical differences being due to contact with neighbouring languages.

== Consonants ==
Below is the IPA phoneme chart of the consonant phonemes of Abkhaz:

Consonant phonemes
		Labial	Alveolar		Palato- alveolar		Alveolo- palatal		Retro- flex	Velar			Uvular					Pharyngeal	
		Labial	plain	lab.	plain	lab.	plain	lab.	Retro- flex	pal.	plain	lab.	pal.	plain	lab.	phar.	lab. + phar.	plain	lab.
Nasal		m	n																
Stop	voiceless	pʰ	tʰ	tʷʰ **[t͡p᫇ʰ]**						kʲʰ	kʰ	kʷʰ							
Stop	voiced	b	d	dʷ **[d͡b̫]**						ɡʲ	ɡ	ɡʷ							
Stop	ejective	pʼ	tʼ	tʷʼ **[t͡p᫇ʼ]**						kʲʼ	kʼ	kʷʼ	qʲʼ	qʼ	qʷʼ				
Affricate	voiceless		t͡sʰ		t͡ʃʰ		t͡ɕʰ (Note: unique to the Bzyp dialect)	t͡ɕʷʰ **[t͡ɕᶠ]**	ʈ͡ʂʰ										
Affricate	voiced		d͡z		d͡ʒ		d͡ʑ	d͡ʑʷ **[d͡ʑᵛ]**	ɖ͡ʐ										
Affricate	ejective		t͡sʼ		t͡ʃʼ		t͡ɕʼ	t͡ɕʷʼ **[t͡ɕᶠʼ]**	ʈ͡ʂʼ										
Fricative	voiceless	f	s		ʃ	ʃʷ **[ʃᶣ]**	ɕ	ɕʷ **[ɕᶠ]** (Note: found in the Bzyp and Sadz dialects of Abkhaz, but not in Abzhywa)	ʂ				χʲ	χ	χʷ	χˤ	χˤʷ	ħ	ħʷ **[ħᶣ]**
Fricative	voiced	v	z		ʒ	ʒʷ **[ʒᶣ]**	ʑ	ʑʷ **[ʑᵛ]**	ʐ				ʁʲ	ʁ	ʁʷ				
Approximant		w	l				j	ɥ											
Trill			r																

The total number of consonant phonemes in Abkhaz is 58 in the Abzhywa dialect, 60 in the Sadz dialect, and 67 in Bzyp.

The obstruents are characterised by a three-fold contrast between voiced, aspirated voiceless and glottalised forms; both the aspirated and glottalised forms are not strong, unless they are being emphasised by the speaker. The glottal stop may be analysed as a separate phoneme by some, since it can be distinguish certain pairs as áaj 'yes', and ʔaj 'no', and it can also be an allophonic variant of [qʼ] in intervocalic positions. Some speakers also pronounce the word /aˈpʼa/ with a [fʼ], but it is not encountered anywhere else.

The consonants in bold show the 4 kinds of labialisation found in Abkhaz. For this reason most Abkhaz linguists prefer using ⟨ᵒ⟩ to represent them in general instead of the standard IPA symbol. The [w]-type is found with the velar stops and uvular stops and fricatives. The labial-palatal [ɥ]-type rounding involves the alveolar, pharyngeal and palatal fricatives. The one found in the dental-alveolar affricates and fricatives is described as an endo-labiodental articulation ([v]-type). The [p]-type is found in the dental stops, where there is full bilabial closure.

The non-pharyngealised dorsal fricatives of Abkhaz may be realised as either velar or uvular depending upon the context in which they are found; here, they have been ranged with the uvulars. Also, while the labialised palatal approximant /ɥ/ is here placed with the approximants, it is actually the reflex of a labialised voiced pharyngeal fricative, preserved in Abaza, and a legacy of this phoneme's origin is a slight constriction of the pharynx for some speakers, resulting in the phonetic realisation [ɥˤ].

== Vowels ==
Abkhaz is often described as having two basic vowels on the phonemic scale: an open vowel /a~ɑ/ and a central vowel /ɨ~ə/. Each has a wide range of allophones in different consonantal environments, with allophones [e] and [i], respectively, next to palatals; and [o] and [u], respectively, next to labials. /a/ also has a long variant /aː/, which is the reflex of old sequences of */ʕa/ or */aʕ/, preserved in Abaza.

== Dialects ==
The Sadz dialect has distinctive consonant gemination; for example, Sadz Abkhaz contrasts /a.χʷa/ ('ashes') vs. /a.χʷːa/ ('worm'), where Abzhywa and Bzyp Abkhaz have only the one form /a.χʷa/ for both; it seems that many Sadz singletons reflect positions where a consonant has been dropped from the beginning of a cluster in the Proto-Northwest Caucasian form (compare Ubykh /tχʷa/ 'ashes'). Some scholars (for instance, Chirikba 2003) prefer to count the Sadz consonant inventory at well over 100 (thus forming the largest consonant inventory in the Caucasus, outstripping Ubykh's 80–84) by treating the geminated consonants as a set in their own right. (Note, however, that this practice is not usual in counting the consonant inventory of a language.)

The Bzyp consonant inventory appears to have been the fundamental inventory of Proto-Abkhaz, with the inventories of Abzhywa and Sadz being reduced from this total, rather than the Bzyp series being innovative. Plain alveolopalatal affricates and fricatives have merged with their corresponding alveolars in Abzhywa and Sadz Abkhaz (compare Bzyp /a.t͡ɕʼa.ra/ 'to know' vs. Abzhywa /a.t͡sʼa.ra/), and in Abzhywa the labialised alveolopalatal fricatives have merged with the corresponding postalveolars (compare Bzyp /a.ɕʷa.ra/ 'to measure' vs. Abzhywa /a.ʃʷa.ra/).

== Notes ==
- Chirikba, V. A. (1996). Common West Caucasian. The reconstruction of its phonological system and parts of its Lexicon and Morphology. Leiden: Research School CNWS.
- Chirikba, V. A. (2003). "Abkhaz". Languages of the World/Materials 119. Lincom Europa.
- Hewitt, B. G. (1979). Abkhaz. London: Routledge.
- Vaux, B.; Pəsiypa., Z. (1997). "The Tshwyzhy dialect of Abkhaz". Harvard Working Papers in Linguistics 6.
