= Bzyb dialect =

Northwestern dialect of Abkhaz

Bzyb
- бзыԥ, бзыԥтәи/бзыԥ ацәажәашьа
- Native to: Turkey, Abkhazia
- Region: Bzyb River
- Native speakers: (30,000 cited 1964)
- Language family: Northwest Caucasian: Abaza–Abkhaz; Abkhaz; Bzyb

Language codes
- ISO 639-3: –
- Glottolog: bzyb1238

Bzyb (also spelled Bzyp) is a major dialect of Abkhaz, native to the Bzyb River region of Caucasus. It was once the literary variety of Abkhaz, but students are now taught in the Abzhuy dialect.

== Phonology ==
It differs from standard Abkhaz mainly in terms of phonology. It has 69 consonant phonemes. It shares the [ɕʷ] and [ʑʷ] sounds with the Sadz dialect, and the [t͡ɕ], [d͡ʑ], [t͡ɕʼ], [ɕ], [ʑ], [χˤ], and [χˤʷ] sounds are unique to Bzyb. Standard Abkhaz (which is based on the Abzhywa dialect) lacks these sounds.

The phoneme [ɥ] ⟨Ҩ ҩ⟩ was originally a labialized pharyngeal fricative [ʕʷ].

The Bzyb consonant inventory appears to have been the fundamental inventory of Proto-Abkhaz, with the inventories of Abzhywa and Sadz being reduced from this total, rather than the Bzyb series being innovative.

== Orthography ==
Bzyb was first written in 1862, when Peter von Uslar introduced a Cyrillic-based orthography for it, partially inspired by Anders Johan Sjögren's 1844 Ossetian alphabet. The alphabet is as follows:

а	б	ҩ	г	ӷ	д	ꚁ	е
ж	ђ	ꚅ	ꚅ̆	з	ӡ	ꚃ	һ
ꚕ	і	ј	к	қ	л	м	н
о	п	ԥ	ԛ	р	с	т	ҭ
ꚍ	ꚍ̆	у	ф	х	ц	10pх	ꚏ
ꚏ̆			ч	Char (Cyrillic)	ҽ	ҽ̆	ш
ш̆	ꚗ	ꚗ̆	ѵ				

With the modern orthography, Viacheslav Chirikba transcribes the phonemes unique to Bzyb, or to Bzyb and Sadz, with digraphs : зь /ʑ/, ӡь /d͡ʑ/, сь /ɕ/, х' /χ/, ць /t͡ɕʰ/, ҵь /t͡ɕʼ/.

== See also ==
- Abkhaz phonology
