= C with descender =

Letter of the Latin script

Usage
- Writing system: Latin script
- Type: alphabetic
- Language of origin: Abkhaz language, Adyghe language, Kabardian language, Komi language, Udi language
- Sound values: [t͡sʼ], [t͡ɕ], [d͡ʒ]
- In Unicode: unencoded
- Alphabetical position: 4th

History
Development
  T14
          - ج
            - Γ γ
              - 𐌂
                - C c
- Time period: 1920s-30s
- Transliterations: Цӏ цӏ, Ч ч, Ҵ ҵ

C with descender is a letter of the Latin script, used in various Latinized scripts for languages of the Soviet Union. Due to the shift of the alphabets of Soviet languages from Latin to Cyrillic, it fell out of use, and has not been encoded in Unicode.

== Usage ==
C with descender was used in the Abkhaz, Adyghe, Kabardian, Komi and Udi languages, representing the sound [t͡sʼ] in Adyghe, Abkhaz and Kabardian, [d͡ʒ] in Udi and [t͡ɕ] in Komi.

== Computing codes ==
This letter has not yet been encoded in Unicode.
