= Retroflex affricate =

Retroflex affricate can refer to:

- Voiced retroflex affricate
- Voiceless retroflex affricate
- Retroflex ejective affricate
