= Voiced labial–palatal approximant =

Consonantal sound represented by ⟨ɥ⟩ in IPA

ɥ
- IPA number: 171

Audio sample
- source · help

Encoding
- Entity (decimal): &#613;
- Unicode (hex): U+0265
- X-SAMPA: H
- Braille: ⠲ (braille pattern dots-256) ⠓ (braille pattern dots-125)
Image

A voiced labial–palatal (or labio-palatal) approximant is a type of consonantal sound, used in some spoken languages, for example, French huitième, read as [ɥitjɛm]. It has two constrictions in the vocal tract: with the tongue on the palate, and rounded at the lips. The symbol in the International Phonetic Alphabet that represents this sound is ⟨ɥ⟩, a rotated lowercase letter ⟨h⟩.

A labial–palatal approximant can in many cases be considered the semivocalic equivalent of the close front rounded vowel [y]. They alternate with each other in certain languages, such as French, and in the diphthongs of some languages, ⟨ɥ⟩ and ⟨y̑⟩ with the non-syllabic diacritic are used in different transcription systems to represent the same sound. Sometimes, ⟨y̆⟩ is written in place of ⟨y̑⟩, even though the former symbol denotes an extra-short [y] in the official IPA.

Some languages, though, have a palatal approximant that is unspecified for rounding, and therefore cannot be considered the semivocalic equivalent of either [y] or its unrounded counterpart [i]. An example of such a language is Spanish, in which a labialized palatal approximant (non-semivowel) appears allophonically with back vowels in words such as ayuda [aˈʝ̞ʷuð̞a] ('help'), while unrounded elsewhere, such as ayer [aˈʝ̞eɾ] ('yesterday'). Therefore, according to some sources, it is not correct to transcribe this sound with the symbol ⟨ɥ⟩, which has a different kind of rounding, or with a modified ⟨j⟩, which according to the same sources cannot be rounded at all; the only suitable transcription is ⟨ʝ̞ʷ⟩. See palatal approximant § Phonetic ambiguity and transcription usage for more information.

There is also a labialized post-palatal or pre-velar approximant in some languages, which is articulated slightly more back compared with the place of articulation of the prototypical labialized palatal approximant, though not as back as the prototypical labialized velar approximant. It can be considered the semivocalic equivalent of the close central rounded vowel [ʉ]. The International Phonetic Alphabet does not have a separate symbol for that sound, though it can be transcribed as ⟨ɥ᫢⟩ (a retracted ⟨ɥ⟩), ⟨ɥ̈⟩ (centralized ⟨ɥ⟩), ⟨w̟⟩ (advanced ⟨w⟩), or ⟨ẅ⟩ (centralized ⟨w⟩). These symbols may be used separately to distinguish compressed (exolabial) and protruded (endolabial) rounding, as in ⟨ɥ᫢⟩ vs ⟨w̟⟩ or ⟨ɥ̈⟩ vs ⟨ẅ⟩. Other possible transcriptions include ⟨ȷ̈ʷ⟩ (a centralized and labialized ⟨j⟩) and ⟨ʉ̯⟩ (a non-syllabic ⟨ʉ⟩). The para-IPA symbols ⟨~~ɥ~~ ~~w~~⟩ (barred ⟨ɥ w⟩) may also be used for the exolabial and endolabial variants of the post-palatal approximant respectively, and are scheduled to be supported by Unicode in September 2026.

== Compressed palatal approximant ==
A compressed palatal approximant is typically transcribed in IPA simply as ⟨ɥ⟩, and that is the convention used in this article. There is no dedicated diacritic for compression in the IPA. However, the compression of the lips can be shown with the letter ⟨β̞⟩ as ⟨j͡β̞⟩ (simultaneous [j] and labial compression) or ⟨jᵝ⟩ ([j] modified with labial compression). The spread-lip diacritic ⟨ ͍⟩ may also be used with a labialized approximant letter ⟨ɥ͍⟩ (or ⟨ɥ⃡⟩) as an ad hoc symbol, though technically 'spread' means unrounded.

A compressed post-palatal or pre-velar approximant can be transcribed simply as ⟨ɥ̈⟩ (centralized [ɥ]), and that is the convention used in this article. Other possible transcriptions include ⟨ȷ̈ᵝ⟩ (centralized [j] modified with labial compression), ⟨ẅ͍⟩ (centralized [w] with the spread-lip diacritic), and the para-IPA ⟨ɥ̶ / ~~ɥ~~⟩ (barred ⟨ɥ⟩).

=== Features ===
Features of the compressed palatal approximant:

- Its manner of articulation is approximant, which means it is produced by narrowing the vocal tract at the place of articulation, but not enough to produce a turbulent airstream.
- Its place of articulation is palatal and in addition it is endo-labialized, which is accomplished by raising the body of the tongue toward the palate while approximating the lips.
- Its phonation is voiced, which means the vocal cords vibrate during the articulation.
- It is an oral consonant, which means that air is not allowed to escape through the nose.
- It is a median consonant, which means it is produced by directing the airstream down the midline of the tongue, rather than to the sides.
- Its airstream mechanism is pulmonic, which means it is articulated by pushing air only with the intercostal muscles and abdominal muscles, as in most speech sounds.

=== Occurrence ===
Because a labialized palatal approximant is assumed to have compression, and few descriptions cover the distinction, some examples in the table below may actually have protrusion.

Language		Word	IPA	Meaning	Notes
Abkhaz		ауаҩы	[awaˈɥə]	'human'	See Abkhaz phonology
Breton	Gwenedeg	ouilhad	[ɥiːʎɐt]	'escapade'	Realization of /w/ before front vowels.
Dida					Allophone of /w/ before high front vowels.
English	Bay Islands	will	[ɥɪl]	'will'	Allophone of /w/ or /v/ that only occurs before /i/ or /ɪ/. See Bay Islands English#Phonology.
French		nuire	[nɥiʁ]	'to harm'	Merges with /w/ or /y/ in Belgian French. See French phonology
Iaai		vëk	[ɥæk]	'four'	Contrasts with the voiceless /ɥ̊/.
Kham	Gamale Kham	व़े	[ɥe]	'husband'	
Korean	Gyeonggi	쉬엄쉬엄 / swieomswieom	[ɕɥiʌmɕɥiʌm]	'Take it easy'	Only occurs before /i/. See Korean phonology
Kurdish		düa	[dʉːɥɑː]	'back'	See Kurdish phonology
Mandarin		月 / yuè	[ɥe̹˥˩]	'moon'	See Mandarin phonology
Norwegian	Urban East	dualisme	[dʉ̞ɥ̈ɑˈlɪ̟smə]	'dualism'	Post-palatal; appears prevocalically after the compressed close vowels /ʉ, ʉː/. May be transcribed with ⟨w̟⟩ or simply ⟨w⟩. See Norwegian phonology
Occitan		nuèch	[ˈnɥɛtʃ]	'night'	See Occitan phonology
Shipibo					Allophone of /w/ before /i, ĩ/. Only lightly labialized.
Shanghainese		浴 / yoq	[ɥo̽ʔ˥]	'bath'	Allophone of /j/ before rounded vowels.
Swedish	Central Standard	ful	[fʉ̟ɥl]	'ugly'	Non-syllabic element of the common diphthongal realization of /ʉː/ ([ʉ̟ɥ]); can be a fricative instead. Palatal in the Central Standard variety, post-palatal in some other varieties. See Swedish phonology
Upper Sorbian		wěm	[ɥɪm]	'I know'	Soft counterpart of /w/.
Xumi	Lower	[dʑɥɛ˩˥]		'fang'	Allophone of /w/ when preceded by an (alveolo-)palatal initial and/or followed by one of the front vowels /i, e, ɛ/ (in Upper Xumi also /ĩ/).
Xumi	Upper	[dɥe˩˥]		'to ask'	Allophone of /w/ when preceded by an (alveolo-)palatal initial and/or followed by one of the front vowels /i, e, ɛ/ (in Upper Xumi also /ĩ/).

== Protruded palatal approximant ==
Protruded palatal approximant

ɥ᫇

ɥʷ

ʝ᫛ʷ

As there are no diacritics in the IPA to distinguish protruded and compressed rounding, an old diacritic for labialization, ⟨ ̫⟩, will be used here as an ad hoc symbol for the protruded palatal approximant. Another possible transcription is ⟨ɥʷ⟩ or ⟨jʷ⟩ (a palatal approximant modified by endolabialization).

Acoustically, this sound is between the more typical compressed palatal approximant [ɥ] and a non-labialized palatal approximant [j].

A protruded post-palatal or pre-velar approximant can be transcribed simply as ⟨ẅ⟩ (centralized [w]). Other possible transcriptions include ⟨ȷ̈ʷ⟩ (centralized [j] modified with endolabialization), ⟨ɥ̫̈⟩ (centralized [ɥ] with labialization), and the para-IPA ⟨w̶ / ~~w~~⟩ (barred ⟨w⟩).

=== Features ===
Features of a protruded palatal approximant:

- Its manner of articulation is approximant, which means it is produced by narrowing the vocal tract at the place of articulation, but not enough to produce a turbulent airstream.
- Its place of articulation is labial–palatal, which is accomplished by raising the body of the tongue toward the palate while approximating the lips.
- Its phonation is voiced, which means the vocal cords vibrate during the articulation.
- It is an oral consonant, which means that air is not allowed to escape through the nose.
- It is a median consonant, which means it is produced by directing the airstream down the midline of the tongue, rather than to the sides.
- Its airstream mechanism is pulmonic, which means it is articulated by pushing air only with the intercostal muscles and abdominal muscles, as in most speech sounds.

=== Occurrence ===
Language		Word	IPA	Meaning	Notes
Norwegian	Urban East	cyanid	[sʏ̫ɥ᫇ɑˈniːd]	'cyanide'	Appears prevocalically after the protruded close vowels /ʏ, yː/. See Norwegian phonology
Spanish		ayuda	[äˈʝ᫛ʷuð̞ä]	'help'	Approximant consonant; lenited allophone of /ɟ͡ʝ/ before and between rounded vowels. May be a fricative [ʝʷ] in emphatic speech. See Spanish phonology

== Notes ==
Place →	Labial					Coronal										Dorsal					Laryngeal			
Manner ↓	Bilabial		Labiodental		Linguolabial		Dental		Alveolar		Postalveolar		Retroflex		(Alveolo-)palatal		Velar		Uvular		Pharyngeal/epiglottal		Glottal	
Nasal	m̥	m	ɱ̊	ɱ		n̼	n̪̊	n̪	n̥	n	n̠̊	n̠	ɳ̊	ɳ	ɲ̊	ɲ	ŋ̊	ŋ	ɴ̥	ɴ				
Plosive	p	b	p̪	b̪	t̼	d̼	t̪	d̪	t	d			ʈ	ɖ	c	ɟ	k	ɡ	q	ɢ	ʡ		ʔ	
Sibilant affricate							t̪s̪	d̪z̪	ts	dz	t̠ʃ	d̠ʒ	tʂ	dʐ	tɕ	dʑ								
Non-sibilant affricate	pɸ	bβ	p̪f	b̪v			t̪θ	d̪ð	tɹ̝̊	dɹ̝	t̠ɹ̠̊˔	d̠ɹ̠˔			cç	ɟʝ	kx	ɡɣ	qχ	ɢʁ	ʡʜ	ʡʢ	ʔh	
Sibilant fricative							s̪	z̪	s	z	ʃ	ʒ	ʂ	ʐ	ɕ	ʑ								
Non-sibilant fricative	ɸ	β	f	v	θ̼	ð̼	θ	ð	θ̠	ð̠	ɹ̠̊˔	ɹ̠˔	ɻ̊˔	ɻ˔	ç	ʝ	x	ɣ	χ	ʁ	ħ	ʕ	h	ɦ
Approximant		β̞		ʋ				ð̞		ɹ		ɹ̠		ɻ		j		ɰ						˷
Tap/flap		ⱱ̟		ⱱ					ɾ̥	ɾ			ɽ̊	ɽ						ɢ̆		ʡ̆		
Trill	ʙ̥	ʙ							r̥	r		r̠	ɽ̊r̥	ɽr					ʀ̥	ʀ	ʜ	ʢ		
Lateral affricate									tɬ	dɮ			tꞎ	d𝼅	c𝼆	ɟʎ̝	k𝼄	ɡʟ̝						
Lateral fricative							ɬ̪		ɬ	ɮ			ꞎ	𝼅	𝼆	ʎ̝	𝼄	ʟ̝						
Lateral approximant								l̪	l̥	l		l̠	ɭ̊	ɭ	ʎ̥	ʎ	ʟ̥	ʟ		ʟ̠				
Lateral tap/flap									ɺ̥	ɺ			𝼈̊	𝼈		ʎ̆		ʟ̆						

		BL	LD	D	A	PA	RF	P	V	U
Implosive	Voiced	ɓ			ɗ		ᶑ	ʄ	ɠ	ʛ
Implosive	Voiceless	ɓ̥			ɗ̥		ᶑ̊	ʄ̊	ɠ̊	ʛ̥
Ejective	Stop	pʼ			tʼ		ʈʼ	cʼ	kʼ	qʼ
Ejective	Affricate		p̪fʼ	t̪θʼ	tsʼ	t̠ʃʼ	tʂʼ	tɕʼ	kxʼ	qχʼ
Ejective	Fricative	ɸʼ	fʼ	θʼ	sʼ	ʃʼ	ʂʼ	ɕʼ	xʼ	χʼ
Ejective	Lateral affricate				tɬʼ			c𝼆ʼ	k𝼄ʼ	q𝼄ʼ
Ejective	Lateral fricative				ɬʼ					
Click (top: velar; bottom: uvular)	Tenuis	kʘ qʘ		kǀ qǀ	kǃ qǃ		k𝼊 q𝼊	kǂ qǂ		
Click (top: velar; bottom: uvular)	Voiced	ɡʘ ɢʘ		ɡǀ ɢǀ	ɡǃ ɢǃ		ɡ𝼊 ɢ𝼊	ɡǂ ɢǂ		
Click (top: velar; bottom: uvular)	Nasal	ŋʘ ɴʘ		ŋǀ ɴǀ	ŋǃ ɴǃ		ŋ𝼊 ɴ𝼊	ŋǂ ɴǂ	ʞ	
Click (top: velar; bottom: uvular)	Tenuis lateral				kǁ qǁ					
Click (top: velar; bottom: uvular)	Voiced lateral				ɡǁ ɢǁ					
Click (top: velar; bottom: uvular)	Nasal lateral				ŋǁ ɴǁ					
