= Voiced labiodental fricative =

Consonantal sound represented by ⟨v⟩ in IPA

v
- IPA number: 129

Audio sample
- source · help

Encoding
- Entity (decimal): &#118;
- Unicode (hex): U+0076
- X-SAMPA: v
- Braille: ⠧ (braille pattern dots-1236)
Image

A voiced labiodental fricative is a type of consonantal sound used in some spoken languages. It is familiar to English-speakers as the "v" sound in "vase". The symbol in the International Phonetic Alphabet that represents this sound is ⟨v⟩.

The sound is similar to voiced alveolar fricative /z/ in that it is familiar to most European speakers but is a fairly uncommon sound cross-linguistically, occurring in approximately 21.1% of languages. Moreover, most languages that have /z/ also have /v/ and similarly to /z/, the overwhelming majority of languages with [v] are languages of Europe, Africa, or Western Asia, although the similar labiodental approximant /ʋ/ is also common in India. The presence of [v] and absence of [w], is a very distinctive areal feature of European languages and those of adjacent areas of Siberia and Central Asia. Speakers of East Asian languages that lack this sound may pronounce it as [b] (Korean and Japanese), or [f]/[w] (Cantonese and Mandarin), and thus be unable to distinguish between a number of English minimal pairs.

In certain languages, such as Danish, Faroese, Icelandic or Norwegian the voiced labiodental fricative is in a free variation with the labiodental approximant.

== Features ==
Features of a voiced labiodental fricative:

- Its manner of articulation is fricative, which means it is produced by constricting air flow through a narrow channel at the place of articulation, causing turbulence.
- Its place of articulation is labiodental, which means it is articulated with the lower lip and the upper teeth.
- Its phonation is voiced, which means the vocal cords vibrate during the articulation.
- It is an oral consonant, which means that air is not allowed to escape through the nose.
- Because the sound is not produced with airflow over the tongue, the median–lateral dichotomy does not apply.
- Its airstream mechanism is pulmonic, which means it is articulated by pushing air only with the intercostal muscles and abdominal muscles, as in most speech sounds.

== Occurrence ==
Language		Word	IPA	Meaning	Notes
Abkhaz		европа(evropa)	[evˈropʼa]	'Europe'	See Abkhaz phonology
Adyghe		жъвэ / ẑvă	[ʐvɜ]	'oar'	
Afrikaans		wees	[vɪəs]	'to be'	See Afrikaans phonology
Albanian		valixhe	[vaˈlidʒɛ]	'case'	
Arabic	Algerian	كاڥي(kāvī)	[kavi]	'ataxy'	See Arabic phonology
Arabic	Hejazi	فيروس(vayrūs	[vajˈruːs]	'virus'	Only used in loanwords, transcribed and pronounced as [f] by many speakers.
Arabic	Siirt	ذهب(vahab)	[vaˈhab]	'gold'	See Arabic phonology
Armenian	Eastern	վեց / vecʼ	[vɛtsʰ]	'six'	
Assyrian		ܟܬܒ̣ܐ / ctava	[ctaːva]	'book'	Only in the Urmia dialects. [ʋ] is also predominantly used. Corresponds to [w] in the other varieties.
Bai	Dali	?	[ŋv˩˧]	'fish'	
Bulgarian		вода / voda	[voda]	'water'	See Bulgarian phonology
Catalan	Algherese	vell	[ˈveʎ]	'old'	See Catalan phonology
Catalan	Balearic	vell	[ˈveʎ]	'old'	See Catalan phonology
Catalan	Southern Catalonia	vell	[ˈveʎ]	'old'	See Catalan phonology
Catalan	Valencian	vell	[ˈveʎ]	'old'	See Catalan phonology
Chechen		вашa / vaşa	[vaʃa]	'brother'	
Chinese	Wu	饭 / ⁶vae	[vɛ]	'cooked rice'	
Chinese	Sichuanese	五 / wu³	[vu˥˧]	'five'	Corresponds to /w/ in standard Mandarin.
Czech		voda	[ˈvoda]	'water'	See Czech phonology
Chichewa					Has both plain and labialized.
Danish	Standard	véd	[ve̝ːˀð̠˕ˠ]	'know(s)'	Most often an approximant [ʋ]. See Danish phonology
Dutch	All dialects	wraak	[vraːk]	'revenge'	Allophone of /ʋ/ before /r/. See Dutch phonology
Dutch	Most dialects	vreemd	[vreːmt]	'strange'	Often devoiced to [f] by speakers from the Netherlands. See Dutch phonology
Dutch	Standard	vreemd	[vreːmt]	'strange'	Often devoiced to [f] by speakers from the Netherlands. See Dutch phonology
English	All dialects	valve	[væɫv]	'valve'	See English phonology
English	African American	breathe	[bɹiːv]	'breathe'	Does not occur word-initially. See th-fronting
English	Cockney	breathe	[bɹəi̯v]	'breathe'	Does not occur word-initially. See th-fronting
Esperanto		vundo	[ˈvundo]	'wound'	See Esperanto phonology
Ewe		evlo	[évló]	'he is evil'	
Faroese		veður	[ˈveːʋuɹ]	'speech'	Word-initial allophone of /v/, in free variation with an approximant [ʋ]. See Faroese phonology
French		valve	[valv]	'valve'	See French phonology
Georgian		ვიწრო(vitsʼro)	[ˈvitsʼɾo]	'narrow'	
German		Wächter	[ˈvɛçtɐ]	'guard'	See Standard German phonology
Greek		βερνίκι / verníki	[ve̞rˈnici]	'varnish'	See Modern Greek phonology
Hebrew		גב/gav	[ɡäv]	'back'	See Modern Hebrew phonology
Hindi		व्रत(vrat)	[vrət̪]	'fast'	See Hindustani phonology
Hmong		𖬖𖬰𖬜 / vaj	[va˥˨]	'king', 'vang clan last name'	
Hungarian		veszély	[vɛseːj]	'danger'	See Hungarian phonology
Irish		bhaile	[vaːlə]	'home'	See Irish phonology
Italian		avare	[aˈvare]	'miserly' (f. pl.)	See Italian phonology
Judaeo-Spanish		mueve	[ˈmwɛvɛ]	'nine'	
Kabardian		вагъуэ / vağue / ۋاغوە	[vaːʁʷa]	'star'	Corresponds to [ʒʷ] in Adyghe
Kashmiri		وَرزِش	[vaɾzɪʃ]	'exercise'	See Kashmiri phonology
Macedonian		вода / voda	[vɔda]	'water'	See Macedonian phonology
Malayalam		വിയർപ്പ് / viyarpp`	[vijɐɾpɨ̆]	'sweat'	Usually pronounced as /ʋ/ by most speakers. See Malayalam phonology
Maltese		iva	[iva]	'yes'	
Norwegian	Urban East	venn	[ve̞nː]	'friend'	Allophone of /ʋ/ before a pause and in emphatic speech. See Norwegian phonology
Occitan	Auvergnat	vol	[vɔl]	'flight'	See Occitan phonology
Occitan	Limousin	vol	[vɔl]	'flight'	See Occitan phonology
Occitan	Provençal	vol	[vɔl]	'flight'	See Occitan phonology
Persian	Western	ورزش varzeš	[væɹ'z̪eʃ]	'sport'	See Persian phonology
Polish		wór	[vur]	'bag'	See Polish phonology
Portuguese		vila	[ˈvilɐ]	'town', 'village'	See Portuguese phonology
Romanian		val	[väl]	'wave'	See Romanian phonology
Russian		волосы / volosy	[ˈvʷo̞ɫ̪əs̪ɨ̞]	'hair'	Contrasts with palatalized form. May be a lenited fricative [v̞] or an approximant [ʋ] instead. See Russian phonology
Scottish Gaelic		a-bhos	[əˈvɔs̪]	'over here'	Loosely articulated, can resemble [β]. See Scottish Gaelic phonology
Serbo-Croatian		voda	[vɔ'da]	'water'	See Serbo-Croatian phonology
Slovak		vzrast	[vzräst]	'height'	Appears only in syllable onset before voiced obstruents; the usual realization of /v/ is an approximant [ʋ]. See Slovak phonology
Slovene	Standard	filozof gre	[filoˈz̪ôːv ˈɡɾěː]	'philosopher goes'	Allophone of /f/ before voiced consonants. See Slovene phonology
Slovene	Some dialects	voda	[ˈvɔ̀ːd̪á]	'water'	Instead of /ʋ/. See Slovene phonology
Spanish	All dialects	afgano	[ävˈɣ̞äno̞]	'Afghan'	Allophone of /f/ before voiced consonants. See Spanish phonology
Spanish	Chilean	nuevo	[ˈnwevo̞]	'new'	Allophone of /b/; pronounced as [β] in other dialects.
Swedish		vägg	[ˈvɛɡː]	'wall'	See Swedish phonology
Turkish		vade	[väːˈd̪ɛ]	'due date'	The main allophone of /v/; realized as bilabial [β ~ β̞] in certain contexts. See Turkish phonology
Tamil		வார்த்தை(vārttai)	[vaːɾt̪ɐi̯]	'word'	See Tamil phonology
Tyap		vak	[vag]	'road'	
Umbundu					Has both plain and nasalized.
Urdu		ورزش(varziš)	[vəɾzɪʃ]	'exercise'	See Hindustani phonology
Vietnamese		và	[vaː˨˩]	'and'	In southern dialects, is in free variation with [j]. See Vietnamese phonology
West Frisian		weevje	[ˈʋeɪ̯vjə]	'to weave'	Never occurs in word-initial positions. See West Frisian phonology
Welsh		fi	[vi]	'I'	See Welsh phonology
Yi		ꃶ / vu	[vu˧]	'intestines'	

== See also ==
- Index of phonetics articles

== Notes ==
Place →	Labial					Coronal										Dorsal					Laryngeal			
Manner ↓	Bilabial		Labiodental		Linguolabial		Dental		Alveolar		Postalveolar		Retroflex		(Alveolo-)palatal		Velar		Uvular		Pharyngeal/epiglottal		Glottal	
Nasal	m̥	m	ɱ̊	ɱ		n̼	n̪̊	n̪	n̥	n	n̠̊	n̠	ɳ̊	ɳ	ɲ̊	ɲ	ŋ̊	ŋ	ɴ̥	ɴ				
Plosive	p	b	p̪	b̪	t̼	d̼	t̪	d̪	t	d			ʈ	ɖ	c	ɟ	k	ɡ	q	ɢ	ʡ		ʔ	
Sibilant affricate							t̪s̪	d̪z̪	ts	dz	t̠ʃ	d̠ʒ	tʂ	dʐ	tɕ	dʑ								
Non-sibilant affricate	pɸ	bβ	p̪f	b̪v			t̪θ	d̪ð	tɹ̝̊	dɹ̝	t̠ɹ̠̊˔	d̠ɹ̠˔			cç	ɟʝ	kx	ɡɣ	qχ	ɢʁ	ʡʜ	ʡʢ	ʔh	
Sibilant fricative							s̪	z̪	s	z	ʃ	ʒ	ʂ	ʐ	ɕ	ʑ								
Non-sibilant fricative	ɸ	β	f	v	θ̼	ð̼	θ	ð	θ̠	ð̠	ɹ̠̊˔	ɹ̠˔	ɻ̊˔	ɻ˔	ç	ʝ	x	ɣ	χ	ʁ	ħ	ʕ	h	ɦ
Approximant		β̞		ʋ				ð̞		ɹ		ɹ̠		ɻ		j		ɰ						˷
Tap/flap		ⱱ̟		ⱱ					ɾ̥	ɾ			ɽ̊	ɽ						ɢ̆		ʡ̆		
Trill	ʙ̥	ʙ							r̥	r		r̠	ɽ̊r̥	ɽr					ʀ̥	ʀ	ʜ	ʢ		
Lateral affricate									tɬ	dɮ			tꞎ	d𝼅	c𝼆	ɟʎ̝	k𝼄	ɡʟ̝						
Lateral fricative							ɬ̪		ɬ	ɮ			ꞎ	𝼅	𝼆	ʎ̝	𝼄	ʟ̝						
Lateral approximant								l̪	l̥	l		l̠	ɭ̊	ɭ	ʎ̥	ʎ	ʟ̥	ʟ		ʟ̠				
Lateral tap/flap									ɺ̥	ɺ			𝼈̊	𝼈		ʎ̆		ʟ̆						

		BL	LD	D	A	PA	RF	P	V	U
Implosive	Voiced	ɓ			ɗ		ᶑ	ʄ	ɠ	ʛ
Implosive	Voiceless	ɓ̥			ɗ̥		ᶑ̊	ʄ̊	ɠ̊	ʛ̥
Ejective	Stop	pʼ			tʼ		ʈʼ	cʼ	kʼ	qʼ
Ejective	Affricate		p̪fʼ	tθʼ	tsʼ	tʃʼ	tʂʼ	tɕʼ	kxʼ	qχʼ
Ejective	Fricative	ɸʼ	fʼ	θʼ	sʼ	ʃʼ	ʂʼ	ɕʼ	xʼ	χʼ
Ejective	Lateral affricate				tɬʼ			c𝼆ʼ	k𝼄ʼ	q𝼄ʼ
Ejective	Lateral fricative				ɬʼ					
Click (top: velar; bottom: uvular)	Tenuis	kʘ qʘ		kǀ qǀ	kǃ qǃ		k𝼊 q𝼊	kǂ qǂ		
Click (top: velar; bottom: uvular)	Voiced	ɡʘ ɢʘ		ɡǀ ɢǀ	ɡǃ ɢǃ		ɡ𝼊 ɢ𝼊	ɡǂ ɢǂ		
Click (top: velar; bottom: uvular)	Nasal	ŋʘ ɴʘ		ŋǀ ɴǀ	ŋǃ ɴǃ		ŋ𝼊 ɴ𝼊	ŋǂ ɴǂ	ʞ	
Click (top: velar; bottom: uvular)	Tenuis lateral				kǁ qǁ					
Click (top: velar; bottom: uvular)	Voiced lateral				ɡǁ ɢǁ					
Click (top: velar; bottom: uvular)	Nasal lateral				ŋǁ ɴǁ					
