= Turned h =

Additional letter of the Latin alphabet

Ɥ
- Ɥ ɥ

Usage
- Writing system: Latin script
- Type: Alphabetic and Logographic
- In Unicode: U+A78D, U+0265

History
- Development: Η η: 𐌇; H h; Ɥ ɥ

Other
- Writing direction: Left-to-Right

Turned H (uppercase: Ɥ, lowercase: ɥ) is an additional letter of the Latin alphabet, based on a turned form of H. It is used in the Dan language in Liberia. Its lowercase form is used in the International Phonetic Alphabet to represent the voiced labial–palatal approximant. It was also historically used in the Abaza, Abkhaz, and the Vassali Maltese alphabet.

== Usage ==
An early usage of turned h appeared in Benjamin Franklin's phonetic alphabet where it represented [ʌ].

During Latinisation, the letter would appear in the Abaza Latin alphabet of 1932 where it denoted the sound [t͡ɕ], and in the Abkhaz Latin alphabet of 1924 where it denoted the sound [t͡ʃʰ]. The letter also appeared in the Vassalli Maltese alphabet, and the Metelko alphabet for Slovene, where it stood for the sound [t͡ʃ].

In the Metelko alphabet, Maltese, Abaza, and Abkhaz languages, the letter had a capital form ⟨Ч⟩, identical to the Cyrillic letter Che. This letter was also used in the first version of Unifon.

Sinological phonetic notation uses two derived forms, turned h with fishhook ⟨ʮ⟩ and with fishhook and tail ⟨ʯ⟩, to represent rounded forms of the so-called "apical vowels".
