= Abaza language =

Northwest Caucasian language

Abaza
- абаза бызшва abaza byzshwa
- Native to: North Caucasus
- Region: Karachay-Cherkessia
- Ethnicity: Abazins
- Native speakers: 51,000 (2021)
- Language family: Northwest Caucasian: Abaza
- Dialects: Ashkherewa; T'ap'anta
- Writing system: Cyrillic, Latin

Official status
- Official language in: Russia: Karachay-Cherkessia

Language codes
- ISO 639-3: abq
- Glottolog: abaz1241
- ELP: Abaza
- Linguasphere: 42-AAB-ab
- Abaza is classified as Definitely Endangered by the UNESCO Atlas of the World's Languages in Danger.

Abaza (Note: Abaza: абаза бызшва, romanized: abaza byzshwa; Adyghe: абазэбзэ; Abkhaz: абаза бызшәа) is a Northwest Caucasian language spoken by Abazins in Russia. The language has gone through several different orthographies based primarily on Latin and Cyrillic letters. Its consonant-to-vowel ratio is remarkably high; making it quite similar to many other languages from the same parent chain. The language evolved in popularity in the mid to late 1800s, but has become an endangered language.

Abaza is spoken by approximately 35,000 people in Russia, where it is written in a Cyrillic alphabet, as well as another 10,000 in Turkey, where the Latin script is used. It consists of two dialects, the Ashkherewa dialect and the T'ap'anta dialect, which is the literary standard. The language also consists of five subdialects known as Psyzh-Krasnovostok, Abazakt, Apsua, Kubin-Elburgan and Kuvin.

Abaza, like its relatives in the family of Northwest Caucasian languages, is a highly agglutinative language. For example, the verb in the English sentence "He couldn't make them give it back to her" contains four arguments (a term used in valency grammar): he, them, it, to her. Abaza marks arguments morphologically, and incorporates all four arguments as pronominal prefixes on the verb.

It has a large consonantal inventory (63 phonemes) coupled with a minimal vowel inventory (two vowels). It is very closely related to Abkhaz, but it preserves a few phonemes which Abkhaz lacks, such as a voiced pharyngeal fricative. Work on Abaza has been carried out by W. S. Allen, Brian O'Herin, and John Colarusso.

== History ==
Different forms of cultural assimilation contributed to its fall in use in areas of Russia, and over time its overall endangerment. The language can be broken into five different dialects and has several unique grammatical approaches to languages. The Abaza language was at its peak usage in the mid to late 19th century.

Abaza speakers along the Greater and Lesser Laba, Urup, and Greater and Lesser Zelenchuk rivers are from a wave of migrants in the 17th to 18th centuries who represent the Abaza speakers of today. The end of the Great Caucasian War in 1864 provided Russia with power and control of the local regions and contributed to the decrease in the popularity of pre-existing local languages prior to the war.

The Abaza language was not a written language until the Latin alphabet was adopted in 1932–1933 to write it. The Cyrillic script was later utilized to write the language in 1938. A small amount of books, pamphlets, and a newspaper were published in the Abaza language afterwards.

== Geographic distribution ==
The Abaza language is spoken in Russia and Turkey. Although it is endangered, it is still spoken in several regions in Russia. These include Kara-Pago, Kubina, Psyzh, El'burgan, Inzhich-Chukun, Koi-dan, Abaza-Khabl', Malo-Abazinka, Tapanta, Krasnovostochni, Novokuvinski, Starokuvinski, Abazakt and Ap-sua.

== Phonology ==
Consonant phonemes of Abaza
		Labial	Alveolar		Postalveolar			Velar			Uvular			Pharyngeal		Glottal
		Labial	plain	sib.	plain	pal.	lab.	plain	pal.	lab.	plain	pal.	lab.	plain	lab.	Glottal
Nasal		m	n													
Plosive/ Affricate	voiceless	p	t	t͡s	t̠͡ʃ	t͡ɕ	t̠͡ʃʷ	k	kʲ	kʷ	qχ		qχʷ			ʔ
Plosive/ Affricate	ejective	pʼ	tʼ	t͡sʼ	t̠͡ʃʼ	t͡ɕʼ	t̠͡ʃʷʼ	kʼ	kʲʼ	kʷʼ	qχʼ	qχʲʼ	qχʷʼ			
Plosive/ Affricate	voiced	b	d	d͡z	d̠͡ʒ	d͡ʑ	d̠͡ʒʷ	ɡ	ɡʲ	ɡʷ						
Fricative	voiceless	f	ɬ	s	ʃ	ɕ	ʃʷ				χ	χʲ	χʷ	ħ	ħʷ	
Fricative	ejective	fʼ	ɬʼ													
Fricative	voiced	v	ɮ	z	ʒ	ʑ	ʒʷ				ʁ	ʁʲ	ʁʷ	ʕ	ʕʷ	
Approximant			l						j	w				ʕ	ʕʷ	
Trill			r													

The vowels [o, a, u] may have a /j/ in front of it. The vowels [e] and [i] are allophones of /a/ and /ə/ (respectively) before palatalized consonants, while the vowels [o] and [u] are allophones of /a/ and /ə/ (respectively) before labialized consonants. The vowels [e], [o], [i], and [u] can also occur as variants of the sequences /aj/, /aw/, /əj/ and /əw/. Abaza does not have the long low vowel found in Kabardian, preserving it as /aʕ/ or /ʕa/.

Vowel phonemes of Abaza
High	ə
Low	a

== Orthography ==
=== Arabic script ===
Around the late 19th to early 20th centuries, there were attempts to write Abaza with the Arabic script, but none of these attempts took hold.

=== Latin script (1932–1938) ===
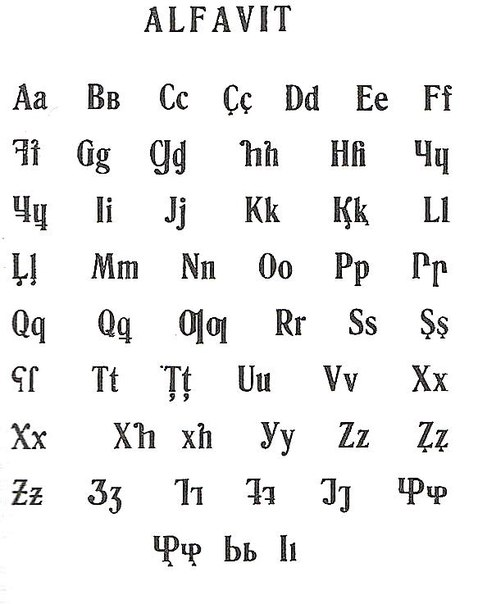
Abaza Latin alphabet

In 1932, the first widely used Abaza alphabet was created using the Latin script. It was used until 1938.

A a [a]	B ʙ /b/	C c /t͡s/	Ç ç /t͡sʼ/	D d /d/	E e [e]	F f /f/	ꟻ /ʃʷ/
G g /ɡ/	Ɡ /d͡ʒ/	/ʔ/	H ɦ /ħ/	Ɥ ɥ /t͡ɕ/	/t͡ɕʼ/	I i [i]	J j /ʒʷ/
K k /k/	Ⱪ ⱪ /kʼ/	L l /l/	L̦ l̦ /ɬ/	M m /m/	N n /n/	O o [o]	P p /p/
/pʼ/	Q q /qʼ/	Ꝗ ꝗ /d͡ʒ/	Ƣ ƣ /ɣ/	R r /r/	S s /s/	Ş ş /ʃ/	ſ /ɕ/
T t /t/	Ț ț /tʼ/	U u /w/, [u]	V v /v/	X x /x/	/q/	X x /x/	У y /ʕ/
Z z /z/	Z̧ z̧ /d͡ʒʷ/	Ƶ ƶ /ʒ/	Ʒ ʒ /d͡z/	/ʑ/	/tɕʼʷ/	/tɕʷ/	/t͡ʃ/
/t͡ʃʼ/	Ь ь [ə]	I ı /ʲ/					

=== Cyrillic script (1938–present) ===
Since 1938, Abaza has been written with the version of the Cyrillic alphabet shown below.

А а [a]	Б б /b/	В в /v/	Г г /ɡ/	Гв гв /ɡʷ/	Гъ гъ /ʁ/	Гъв гъв /ʁʷ/	Гъь гъь /ʁʲ/
Гь гь /ɡʲ/	ГӀ гӀ /ʕ/	ГӀв гӀв /ʕʷ/	Д д /d/	Дж дж /d͡ʒ/	Джв джв /d͡ʒʷ/	Джь джь /d͡ʑ/	Дз дз /d͡z/
Е е [e]	Ё ё [jo]	Ж ж /ʒ/	Жв жв /ʒʷ/	Жь жь /ʑ/	З з /z/	И и [i]	Й й /j/
К к /k/	Кв кв /kʷ/	Къ къ /qʼ/	Къв къв /qʷʼ/	Къь къь /qʲʼ/	Кь кь /kʲ/	КӀ кӀ /kʼ/	КӀв кӀв /kʷʼ/
КӀь кӀь /kʲʼ/	Л л /l/	Ль ль /ɮ/	ЛӀ лӀ /ɬʼ/	М м /m/	Н н /n/	О о [o]	П п /p/
ПӀ пӀ /pʼ/	Р р /r/	С с /s/	Т т /t/	Тл тл /ɬ/	Тш тш /t͡ʃ/	ТӀ тӀ /tʼ/	У у /w/, [u]
Ф ф /f/	ФӀ фӀ /fʼ/	Х х /χ/	Хв хв /χʷ/	Хъ хъ /q/	Хъв хъв /qʷ/	Хь хь /χʲ/	ХӀ хӀ /ħ/
ХӀв хӀв /ħʷ/	Ц ц /t͡s/	ЦӀ цӀ /t͡sʼ/	Ч ч /t͡ɕ/	Чв чв /t͡ʃʷ/	ЧӀ чӀ /t͡ɕʼ/	ЧӀв чӀв /t͡ʃʷʼ/	Ш ш /ʃ/
Шв шв /ʃʷ/	ШӀ шӀ /t͡ʃʼ/	Щ щ /ɕ/	Ъ ъ /ʔ/	Ы ы [ə]	Э э [e]	Ю ю [ju]	Я я [ja]

The digraphs ЛӀ and ФӀ are dialectal, and are therefore absent from the literary language and the official alphabet.

== Media ==
Sultan Laguchev, a singer-songwriter famous in Russia, writes and performs songs in the Abaza language, including "Абыгъь гӀважьква" and "БаъапӀ бара". He has written an additional song in Russian entitled "Мы абазины" ("We are Abazins") about Abazinia.
