= Abkhaz language =

Northwest Caucasian language of Abkhazia

Abkhaz
- Abkhazian
- аԥсшәа; аԥсуа бызшәа apsshwa; apswa byzshwa
- Native to: Abkhazia
- Region: Caucasus
- Ethnicity: Abkhazians
- Native speakers: 190,000 (2015–2019)
- Language family: Northwest Caucasian: Abaza–Abkhaz; Abkhaz
- Dialects: Abzhywan; Bzyp; Sadz
- Writing system: Cyrillic (Abkhaz alphabet) Historically: Latin, Georgian

Official status
- Official language in: Republic of Abkhazia (Note: The political status of Abkhazia is disputed. Having unilaterally declared independence from Georgia in 1992, Abkhazia is formally recognised as an independent state by 4 UN member states (three other states previously recognised it but then withdrew their recognition), while the remainder of the international community recognizes it as de jure Georgian territory. Georgia continues to claim the area as its own territory, designating it as Russian-occupied territory.)
- Recognised minority language in: Georgia

Language codes
- ISO 639-1: ab Abkhazian
- ISO 639-2: abk Abkhazian
- ISO 639-3: abk Abkhazian
- Glottolog: abkh1244 Abkhaz
- Linguasphere: 42-AAB-aa

- Abkhaz is classified as Vulnerable by the UNESCO Atlas of the World's Languages in Danger.

Abkhaz, (Note: /æbˈkɑːz, æpˈxɑːz/ ab-KAHZ, ap-KHAHZ; Аԥсуа бызшәа Apsua byzshwa, pronounced [ˈɑpʰswɑ bəzʃᶣɑ].) also known as Abkhazian, is a Northwest Caucasian language most closely related to Abaza. It is spoken mostly by the Abkhaz people. It is one of the official languages of Abkhazia, where around 190,000 people speak it. Furthermore, it is spoken by thousands of members of the Abkhazian diaspora in Turkey, Georgia's autonomous republic of Adjara, Syria, Jordan, and several Western countries. 27 October is the day of the Abkhazian language in Georgia.

== Classification ==
Abkhaz is a Northwest Caucasian language and is thus related to Circassian and Ubykh. The language of Abkhaz is especially close to Abaza, and they are sometimes considered dialects of the same language, Abazgi, of which the literary dialects of Abkhaz and Abaza are simply two ends of a dialect continuum. Grammatically, the two are very similar; however, the differences in phonology are substantial, it also contains elements characteristic of Kabardian; these are the main reasons for many others to prefer keeping the two separate, while others still refer to it as the Tapanta dialect of Abkhaz. Chirikba mentions that there are possible indications that proto-Northwest Caucasian, could have divided firstly into proto-Circassian and to proto-Ubykh-Abkhaz; Ubykh then being the closest relative to Abkhaz, with it only later on being influenced by Circassian.

== Geographical distribution ==
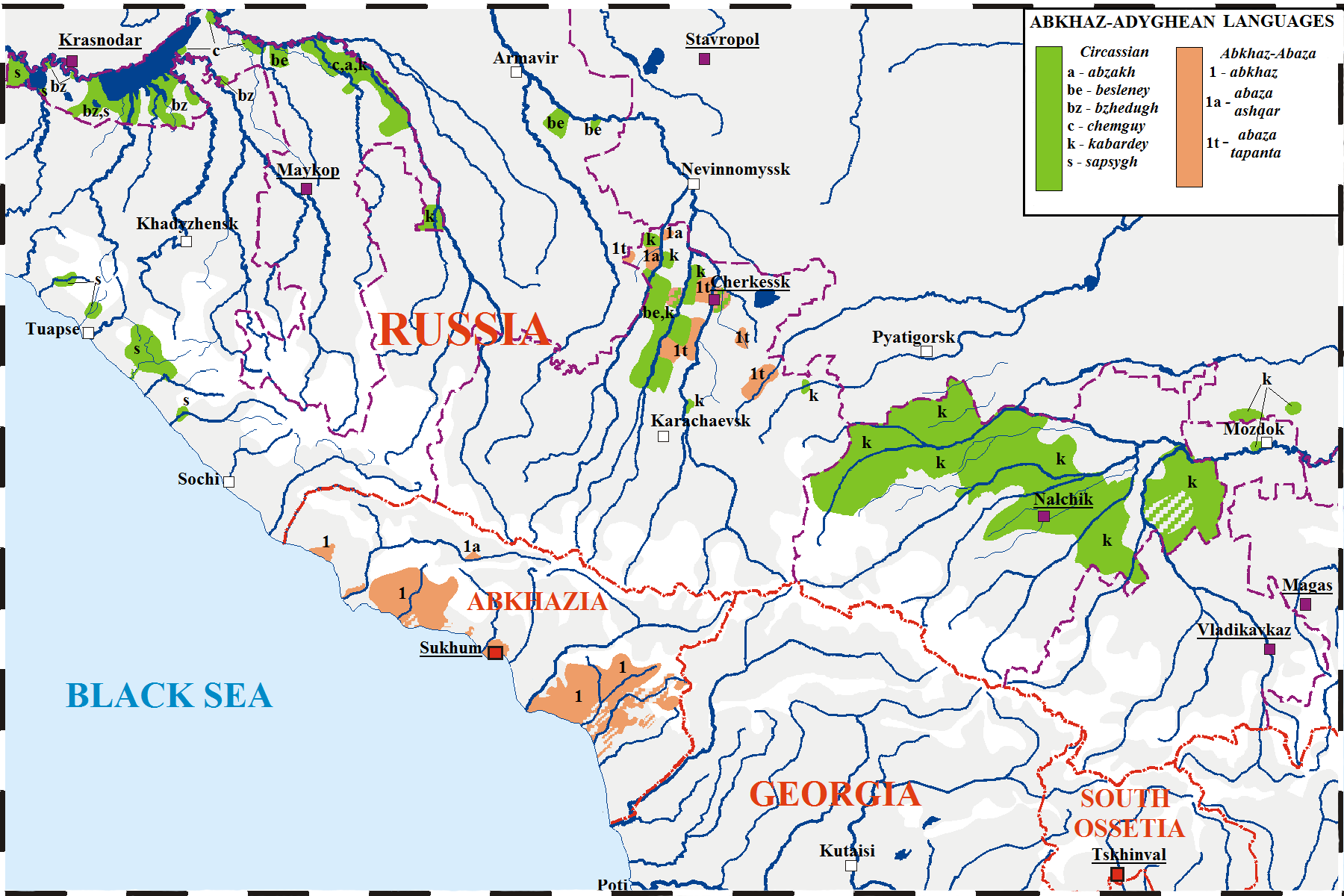
Distribution of Abkhaz in the Caucasus.

There is not an agreed number of speakers of Abkhaz, and there are widely different numbers. It is agreed that today most of the Abkhaz people do not live in Abkhazia. In the census conducted by the Republic of Abkhazia in 2011, Abkhazians comprised 50.8% of the population, around 122,175 people; of these 92,838 spoke it natively. Only two of the original dialects are still spoken in Abkhazia. The Bzyp dialect is still spoken in its homeland northwest of Sukhumi, stretching from the Bzyp River to the western environs of Sukhumi and the Psyrtskha valley, whereas the Abzhywa dialect is spoken south-east of Sukhumi. The rest of the Abkhaz speaking population inhabits other neighbouring areas.

The exact number of Abkhazians and Abkhaz speakers in Turkey is not clear. The Turkish census denotes 13,951, but the figures are dubious, since the numbers of Abkhazians that came from the beginning of the 19th century to the middle of the 20th have been documented at around 30 thousand. Ethnologue gives 150,000 Abkhazians living in Turkey, of these 50,000 still speak the language. The head of the Abkhaz federation says there are in between 500 and 700 thousand Abkhazians in Turkey. In general, Abkhaz seems to have been lost by most of the descendants, and bilingualism being low except in some specific areas, although there seems to be an effort for the new generation to learn the language with public schools being able to teach Abkhaz and together with 7,836 second language speakers. Abkhazian villages are concentrated around the cities of Adapazarı, Düzce, Sinop, Hendek and Samsun in the northern part, and in the west around cities such as Bilecik, Inegöl and Eskişehir; they are mainly found in the provinces of Sakarya and Bolu in the western part, and near the Çoruh river in the north-east.

Historically the dialects of Sadz, Ahchypsy and Tsabal were located in Abkhazia; Sadz being spoken from the Bzyp river to the Matsesta River, and further to the north-west bordering the Sochypsta River. Today they are exclusively spoken in the northwestern part of Turkey, specially in the Sakarya province, it being spoken in 14 villages.

The other major place where Abkhaz is spoken is in Karachay-Cherkessia, where the Northern dialects are spoken, although there they are considered as a separate language and form the literary Abaza language. They are spoken by 37,831 people in Russia, mostly in the south of Stavropol Krai in the area around Kislovodsk, and in the upper Kuma river area.

Abkhaz is also spoken as a minority language around the world. There is a considerable number of Abkhaz speakers in Adjara in southern Georgia, with the diaspora concentrating itself around the capital Batumi, with about 982 people considering Abkhaz their first language. In the Russian census of 2010, 6,786 speakers of Abkhaz were reported in Russia. In Ukraine there are around 1,458 according to the 2001 census, but of these only 317 speak Abkhazian. There were also communities in Syria, Jordan and Iraq with around 5,000 Abkhazians, although this number could reach 10,000 according to the Abkhazia's Foreign Ministry. The biggest western diaspora is in Germany, with around 5,000 speakers, but other communities are found in countries such as the United States, United Kingdom, Austria, France, Belgium and so on.

== History ==
The earliest indisputable extant written records of the Abkhaz language are in the Arabic script, recorded by the Turkish traveller Evliya Çelebi in the 17th century. Abkhaz has been used as a literary language for only about 100 years.

It was suggested that certain inscriptions on Ancient Greek pottery which had been considered nonsense are in fact written in Abkhaz-Adydge languages. The methodology of the research was criticised and the results called improbable.

In 1918, Tbilisi State University became the first institution of higher education to teach Abkhazian language. The founders of the university began to take care of the development and scientific study of the Abkhazian language. At the meeting of the Council of Professors held at Tbilisi State University in 1918, Ivane Javakhishvili noted the scientific importance of studying Caucasian languages. In 1918, by the decision of the Council of Professors, Petre Charaia was invited to teach the Abkhazian language, and from 1925, this mission was continued by Dimitri Gulia and Simon Janashia.

== Status ==
Both Georgian and Abkhaz law enshrines an official status of the Abkhaz language in Abkhazia.

The 1992 law of Georgia, reiterated in the 1995 constitution, grants Abkhaz the status of second official language in the territory of Abkhazia — along with Georgian.

In November 2007, the de facto authorities of Abkhazia adopted a new law "on the state language of the Republic of Abkhazia" that mandates Abkhaz as the language of official communication. According to the law, all meetings held by the president, parliament, and government must be conducted in Abkhaz (instead of Russian, which is currently a de facto administrative language) from 2010, and all state officials will be obliged to use Abkhaz as their language of everyday business from 2015. Some, however, have considered the implementation of this law unrealistic and concerns have been made that it will drive people away from Abkhazia and hurt the independent press due to a significant share of non-Abkhaz speakers among ethnic minorities as well as Abkhaz themselves, and a shortage of teachers of Abkhaz. The law is an attempt to amend a situation where up to a third of the ethnic Abkhaz population are no longer capable of speaking their ethnic language, and even more are unable to read or write it; instead, Russian is the language most commonly used in public life at present.

== Dialects ==
=== Classification ===
Abkhaz is generally viewed as having three major dialects:

- Abzhywa, spoken in the Caucasus, and named after the historical area of Abzhywa (Абжьыуа), sometimes referred to as Abzhui, the Russified form of the name (Abzhuiski dialekt, derived from the Russian form of the name for the area, Абжуа).
- Bzyb or Bzyp, spoken in the Caucasus and in Turkey, and named after the Bzyb (Abkhaz: Бзыԥ) area.
- Sadz, nowadays spoken only in Turkey, formerly also spoken between the rivers Bzyp and Khosta.

The literary language is based on the Abzhywa dialect.

Below is a classification of Abkhaz dialects according to Chirikba (1996):

- Common Abkhaz (Proto-Abkhaz)
  - North Abkhaz
    - Tapanta
  - Ashkharywa
  - South Abkhaz
    - Southwestern
      - Sadz
    - Southeastern
      - Ahchypsy, Bzyp
      - Tsabal, Abzhywa

=== General characteristics ===
In some form or the other, all dialects are richer in phonemes than the standard Abzhywa dialect. The only dialects spoken in Abkhazia are Abzhywa and Bzyp. Northern dialects which are the basis for literary Abaza are spoken in Karachay-Cherkessia, while the other dialects such as Sadz are spoken in Turkey due to Russian invasions in the 19th century. While most differences are phonetic, differences in the lexicon are present, although mostly due to exterior contact. Bzyp contains the most preserved lexicon, with few borrowings. Abzhywa has adopted many loans from Kartvelian, specially Mingrelian; Sadz on the other hand has more words from Circassian. Northern dialects in general have more loanwords from Persian, Arabic, Turkish and Circassian.

== Phonology ==
=== Consonants ===
Abkhaz has a very large number of consonants (58 in the literary dialect), with three-way voiced/voiceless/ejective and palatalized/labialized/plain distinctions. By contrast, the language has only two phonemically distinct vowels, which have several allophones depending on the palatal and/or labial quality of adjacent consonants.

Labialised alveolo-palatal fricatives are found in the Bzyp and Sadz dialects of Abkhaz, but not in Abzhywa. Plain alveolo-palatal consonants and the pharyngealised and labialised-pharyngealised uvular fricatives are unique to the Bzyp dialect.

The consonants highlighted in red and in brackets are the 4 kinds of labialisation described by Chirikba.

Consonant phonemes
		Labial	Alveolar			Palato- alveolar		Alveolo- palatal		Retro- flex	Velar			Uvular					Pharyngeal	
		Labial	plain	lab.	sib.	plain	lab.	plain	lab.	Retro- flex	plain	pal.	lab.	plain	pal.	lab.	phar.	lab. + phar.	plain	lab.
Nasal		m	n																	
Stop/ Affricate	ejective	pʼ	tʼ	tʷʼ [t͡p᫇ʼ]	t͡sʼ	t͡ʃʼ		t͡ɕʼ (Note: Unique to the Bzyp dialect)	t͡ɕʷʼ [t͡ɕᶠ’]	ʈ͡ʂʼ	kʼ	kʲʼ	kʷʼ	qʼ	qʲʼ	qʷʼ				
Stop/ Affricate	voiceless	pʰ	tʰ	tʷʰ [t͡p᫇ʰ]	t͡sʰ	t͡ʃʰ		t͡ɕʰ	t͡ɕʷʰ [t͡ɕᶠ]	ʈ͡ʂʰ	kʰ	kʲʰ	kʷʰ							
Stop/ Affricate	voiced	b	d	dʷ [d͡b̫]	d͡z	d͡ʒ		d͡ʑ	d͡ʑʷ [d͡ʑᵛ]	ɖ͡ʐ	ɡ	ɡʲ	ɡʷ							
Fricative	voiceless	f			s	ʃ	ʃʷ [ʃᶣ]	ɕ	ɕʷ (Note: Found in the Bzyp and Sadz dialects of Abkhaz, but not in Abzhywa.) [ɕᶠ]	ʂ				χ	χʲ	χʷ	χˤ	χˤʷ	ħ	ħʷ [ħᶣ]
Fricative	voiced	v			z	ʒ	ʒʷ [ʒᶣ]	ʑ	ʑʷ [ʑᵛ]	ʐ				ʁ	ʁʲ	ʁʷ				
Approximant			l						ɥ											
Trill			r																	

=== Vowels ===
The nature of the vowels of Abkhaz is not clear. Some linguists, characterise the vowel system as a 2 degree vertical vowel system; with the two vowels being distinguished by height, 'ә' being the high/close vowel, and 'а' being the low/open. This system would very closely resemble the one found in Adyghe. The quality of 'ә' in this case, is usually represented as [ɨ] if the vowel is in a stressed position, and being unaffected by its neighbouring consonants.

	Vowel
Close	ɨ
Open	a

Other linguists however, mainly Russian ones, describe the vowels differently. They describe the sound of 'ә' being completely different from [ɨ], and by their descriptions being closer to [ə]. The 'а' is described as being particularly back, likely [ɑ].

	Central	Back
Mid	ə	
Open		ɑ

== Writing system ==
Abkhaz has used the Cyrillic script since 1862. The first alphabet was a 37-character Cyrillic alphabet invented by Baron Peter von Uslar. In 1909 a 55-letter Cyrillic alphabet was used. A 75-letter Latin script devised by a Russian/Georgian linguist Nikolai Marr lasted for 2 years 1926–1928 (during the Latinization campaign). The Georgian script was adopted and used between 1938 and 1954, after that the initial Cyrillic alphabet, designed in 1892 by Dmitry Gulia together with Konstantin Machavariani and modified in 1909 by Aleksey Chochua, was restored to use.

Cyrillic script:

А а [a]	Б б [b]	В в [v]	Г г [ɡ]	Гь гь [ɡʲ]	Гә гә [ɡʷ]	Ӷ ӷ/Ҕ ҕ [ʁ]	Ӷь ӷь/Ҕь ҕь [ʁʲ]
Ӷә ӷә/Ҕә ҕә [ʁʷ]	Д д [d]	Дә дә [dʷ]	Е е [e̞/aj/ja]	Ж ж [ʐ]	Жь жь [ʒ]	Жә жә [ʒʷ]	З з [z]
Ӡ ӡ [d͡z]	Ӡә ӡә [d͡ʑʷ]	И и [i/jə/əj]	К к [kʼ]	Кь кь [kʲʼ]	Кә кә [kʷʼ]	Қ қ [kʰ]	Қь қь [kʲʰ]
Қә қә [kʷʰ]	Ҟ ҟ [qʼ]	Ҟь ҟь [qʲʼ]	Ҟә ҟә [qʷʼ]	Л л [l]	М м [m]	Н н [n]	О о [o̞/aw/wa]
П п [pʼ]	Ԥ ԥ/Ҧ ҧ [pʰ]	Р р [r]	С с [s]	Т т [tʼ]	Тә тә [tʷʼ]	Ҭ ҭ [tʰ]	Ҭә ҭә [tʷʰ]
У у [u/wə/əw]	Ф ф [f]	Х х [χ]	Хь хь [χʲ]	Хә хә [χʷ]	Ҳ ҳ [ħ]	Ҳә ҳә [ħʷ]	Ц ц [t͡sʰ]
Цә цә [t͡ɕʷ]	Ҵ ҵ [t͡sʼ]	Ҵә ҵә [t͡ɕʷ’]	Ч ч [t͡ʃʰ]	Ҷ ҷ [t͡ʃʼ]	Ҽ ҽ [t͡ʂʰ]	Ҿ ҿ [t͡ʂʼ]	Ш ш [ʂ]
Шь шь [ʃ]	Шә шә [ʃʷ]	Ы ы [ə]	Ҩ ҩ [ɥ/ɥˤ]	Џ џ [d͡ʐ]	Џь џь [d͡ʒ]	Ь ь [ʲ]	Ә ә [ʷ]

Latin script:

a [a]	b [b]	c [t͡sʰ]	c̩ [t͡s’]	d [d]	đ [dʷ]	e [e̞/aj/ja]	f [f]
f [ʃʷ]	g [ɡ]	gl [ɖ͡ʐ]	gı [ɡʲ]	gu [ɡʷ]	ƣ [ʁ]	ƣı [ʁʲ]	ƣu [ʁʷ]
h [ħ]	ħ [ħʷ]	i [i/jə/əj]	j [ʒʷ]	k [kʰ]	kı [kʲʰ]	ku [kʷʰ]	ⱪ [k’]
ⱪı [kʲ’]	ⱪu [kʷ’]	l [l]	m [m]	n [n]	o [o]	p [pʰ]	ꞅ [p’]
q [q’]	qı [qʲ’]	qu [qʷ’]	ꝗ [d͡ʒ]	r [r]	s [s]	s̩ [ʂ]	[ʃ]
t [tʰ]	t̩ [tʼ]	тᴘ [tʷʰ]	ҭᴘ [t͡ʷʼ]	u [u/wə/əw]	v [v]	x [χ]	xı [χʲ]
xu [χʷ]	y [ɥ]	z [z]	ⱬ [d͡ʑʷ]	ƶ [ʐ]	ʒ [d͡z]	чᴘ [ʈ͡ʂʰ]	ҷᴘ [ʈ͡ʂ’]
г [ʒ]	ғ [t͡ɕʷ’]	гȷ [t͡ɕʷ]	ɥ [t͡ʃʰ]	ħ [t͡ʃ’]	ə [ə]		

=== Unicode ===
The Latin alphabet in Abkhaz is currently not in Unicode. Its inclusion was proposed in 2011.

== Grammar ==
Typical of Northwest Caucasian languages, Abkhaz is an agglutinative language that relies heavily on affixation. It has an ergative–absolutive typology, such that the subject of an intransitive verb functions identically to the object of a transitive verb. Notably, Abkhaz expresses ergativity entirely through the ordering of subjects and objects within verb constructions rather than through overt case marking as most other ergative languages do.

All Latin transliterations in this section utilize the system explicated in Chirikba (2003) (see Abkhaz alphabet for the details).

=== Verbs ===
Abkhaz morphology features a highly complex verb system that could be called a "sentence in miniature." Chirikba (2003) describes Abkhaz as a "verbocentric" language wherein verbs occupy the "central part of the morphology." However, despite its complexity, Abkhaz verbal morphology is highly regular.

Abkhaz, being an ergative language, makes a strong distinction between transitive and intransitive verbs, as well as dynamic and stative.

Stative verbs describe states of being, roughly analogous to copular phrases in English, as in дхәыҷуп (d-x˚əčә́-wə-p - "she is a child"). Dynamic verbs express direct actions, functioning more closely to standard English verbs. Dynamic verbs possess the full range of aspect, mood and tense forms, in contrast to statives, which do not.

Some verbs, called inversives, combine certain features of both stative and dynamic verbs.

Another important verbal distinction in Abkhaz is finite versus non-finite. Finite verbs usually contain enough information to form a complete sentence, whereas non-finite verbs typically form dependent clauses.

Finite	дызбеит	"I saw him/her""
Non-finite	избаз	"whom I saw"

Verb stems can be derived in a number of ways, including compounding, affixation, reduplication or conversion from another part of speech.

Roughly equivalent to the infinitive, or to a so-called "verbal noun," the Masdar form of the verb resembles the English gerund. It is formed by the addition of a specific suffix to a bare verb stem, -ра (-ra) for a dynamic verb and -заара (-zaara) for a stative.

аԥхьара
á-px’a-ra
ART-read-MSD
"to read/be reading"

Various prefixes can be added to the Masdar to form entire dependent clauses, as in

аԥибаҽра
a-pә́-j+ba-č-ra
ART-PREV-RECI-break-MSD
"breaking each other"

However, the fully conjugated personal Abkhaz verb forms are "templatic," with each grammatical distinction occupying a specific "slot" or "position" within the broader verb template. Verbs are thus formed by the addition of various affixes to the verb stem; these affixes express such distinctions as transitivity, person and stative/dynamic quality, occupying rigid positions within the overall verb structure. There is a high degree of agreement between verbs and other parts of speech. Overall, the Abkhaz verb is constructed as follows:

[First Position]+[Second Position]+[Third Position]+[Indirect Object]+[Reflexive]+[Free Preverb]+[Stem Preverb]+[Agent]+[Negation]+[Causative]+STEM+[Extension]+[Number]+[Aspect]+[Tense]+[Negation]+[Ending Suffixes]

Not all of these elements will necessarily co-occur in every verb. The individual parts of verb morphology are addressed below.

First position

The first prefixing element of the verb complex expresses either the subject of an intransitive verb in the absolutive construction, or the direct object of a transitive verb in an ergative construction. The following table illustrates the various agreement markers which can occupy the first position. These prefixes can either be in their long forms, containing the letters inside the parenthesis, or in the short forms that do not contain them. The rules for using them are the following:

1. If the prefix is followed by a consonant cluster, the long form is used.
2. If the stress falls on the prefix, the long form is used.
3. If the prefix is not followed by a consonant cluster, the short form is used.
4. If the stress does not fall on the prefix, the short form is used.

Person	Gender		Absolutive		Oblique		Ergative	
Person	Gender		sg.	pl.	sg.	pl.	sg.	pl.
1st			с(ы)-	ҳ(а)-	с(ы)-	ҳ(а)-	с(ы)- / з(ы)-	ҳ(а)- / аа-
2nd	H	M	у(ы)-	шә(ы)-	у(ы)-	шә(ы)-	у(ы)-	шә(ы)- / жә(ы)-
2nd	H	F	б(ы)-	шә(ы)-	б(ы)-	шә(ы)-	б(ы)-	шә(ы)- / жә(ы)-
2nd	NH		у(ы)-	шә(ы)-	у(ы)-	шә(ы)-	у(ы)-	шә(ы)- / жә(ы)-
3rd	H	M	д(ы)-	и(ы)-	и(ы)-	р(ы)- / д(ы)-	и(ы)-	р(ы)- / д(ы)-
3rd	H	F	д(ы)-	и(ы)-	л(ы)-	р(ы)- / д(ы)-	л(ы)-	р(ы)- / д(ы)-
3rd	NH		и(ы)-	и(ы)-	а-	р(ы)- / д(ы)-	(н)а-	р(ы)- / д(ы)-

It is also possible for the possessive prefix ҽы́- (čə́-) in a reflexive construction or the relative prefix иы́- (jә́-) in a non-finite construction to occupy this position.

Example of an absolutive construction with the intransitive subject in the first slot highlighted

сцоит
s-cá-wa-jt
I(S)-go-PRES:DYN-FIN
"I go."

Example of an ergative construction with the direct object in the first slot highlighted

избоит
jə-z-ba-wá-jt
it(DO)-I(A)-see-PRES:DYN-FIN
"I see it."

Example of a reflexive construction with the possessive prefix in the first slot

лҽылшьуеит
l-čә́-l-šʹ-wa-jt
her(POSS)-REFL-she(A)-kill-PRES:DYN-FIN
"She kills herself."

Second position

The second position is occupied by the indirect object or by the prefix аи- (aj-) for reciprocal pronouns equivalent to "each other" or "one another" in English.

илысҭеит
jə-lә́-s-ta-ø-jt
it(DO)-to her(IO)-I(A)-give-AOR-DYN:FIN
"I gave it to her."

Third position

This position accommodates a number of prefixes.

Preposition	Prefix
Relational	а́-
Benefactive	зы́- (zə́-)
Detrimental	цәы́- (c°ə́-)
Non-volitional	а́мха- (ámxa-)
Comitative	ц- (c-)
Potential	з- (z-)
Relative	шы́- (šə́-)
Reciprocal	аи- (aj-)

исцәылгеит
jə-s-c°ə́--l-ga-ø-jt
it(DO)-me-DETR-she-take-AOR-DYN:FIN
"She took it from me against my will."

Second indirect object

Any indirect object occurring after the one in the second position occupies this position instead; a possessive prefix of stative verbs can also be placed here.

исызлыиҭеит
jə-sə-z-lә́-j-ta-ø-jt
it(DO)-me(IO)-BENF-her(IO)-he(A)-give-AOR-DYN:FIN
"He gave it to her for me."

Reflexive

Where a possessive prefix exists in the first position, the reflexive prefix is placed here.

лҽылшьуеит
l-čә́-l-šʹ-wa-jt
her(POSS)-REFL-she(A)-kill-PRES:DYN-FIN
"She kills herself."

Free preverb

This position is occupied by preverbal elements which are not an explicit part of the verb stem.

днатәеит
d-na-t’º-á-ø-jt
(s)he-PREV('thither')-sit-AOR-DYN:FIN
"(S)he sat down (for a moment)."

Stem preverb

Preverbal elements that are explicitly attached to the verb stem take this position.

иҟасҵоит
jə-q’a-s-c’a-wá-jt
it-SPREV-I-do-PRES:DYN-FIN
"I am doing it."

Agent

The agreement marker corresponding to the agent (the subject of a transitive verb) takes this position.

илысҭеит
jə-lә́-s-ta-ø-jt
it(DO)-to her(IO)-I(A)-give-AOR-DYN:FIN
"I gave it to her."

Negation (dynamic)

The negation prefix m- occupies this position in a dynamic verb construction.

иҟасымҵе́ит
jə-q’a-sə-m-c’á-ø-jt
it(DO)-SPREV-I(A)-NEG-do-AOR-DYN:FIN
"I did not do it."

Causative

The causative prefix r- takes the final position before the verb stem.

исзы́мырҽеит
jə-s-zә́-mə-r-čaj-ø-jt
it(DO)-I(A)-POT-NEG-CAUS-good-AOR-DYN:FIN
"I did not manage to make it better."

Extension

The first of the suffixing elements expresses adverbial information relating to "inside" (-la) or "outside" (-aa).

иаҭа́игалеит
jə-tá-j-ga-la-ø-jt
it(DO)-SPREV-he(A)-bring-EXT-AOR-DYN:FIN
"He brought it inside."

Number The suffix -kºá pluralizes a stative verb.

итәақәаз
jə-t’ºá-kºá-z
REL-sit-PL-PAST:STAT:NFIN
"Those who were sitting."

Aspect

Several aspect markers occupy this position as suffixes.

Aspect	Suffix
Progressive	-уа (-wa)
Excessive	-цәа (-c°a)
Habitual	-ла (-la)
Repetitive	-х
Emphatic	-ӡ

Tense

Several tense markers occupy this position, dependent upon whether the verb in question is stative or dynamic. Dynamic verbs have a richly developed tense paradigm incorporating tense and aspect distinctions. The table below illustrates these various dynamic tense forms using the verb агара (agara – "to take").

	Finite	Non-finite	Example	English
Present	-уа-ит(-wá-jt’)	-уа(-wa)	дыргоит (dərgawájt’)	"They are taking him."
Aorist	-ит(-jt’)	-∅	дырге́ит (dərgájt’)	"They took him."
Future 1	-п (-p’)	-ра (-ra)	дыргап (dərgáp’)	"They will take him."
Future 2	-шт (-št’)	-ша (-ša)	дыргашт (dərgášt’)	"They will probably take him."
Perfect	-ҳьа-ит (-x’ájt’)	-хьоу (-x’áw)	дыргахьеит (dərgax’ájt’)	"They have taken him."
Imperfect	-уан (-wán)	-уаз (-wáz)	дыргон (dərgawán)	"They took him."
Past Indefinite	-н (-n)	-з (-z)	дырган (dərgán)	"They took him and then..."
Future Conditional 1	-рын (-rә́n)	-рыз (-rəz)	дыргарын (dərgarә́n)	"They would take him."
Future Conditional 2	-шан (-šan)	-шаз (-šaz)	дыргашан (dərgášan)	"They had to take him."
Pluperfect	-хьан (-x’án)	-хьаз (-x’az)	дыргахьан (dərgax’án)	"They had taken him."

Stative verbs, by contrast, lack this rich tense system, as illustrated below using the verb а́цәара (ácºara - "to be sleeping").

	Finite	Non-finite	Example	English
Past	-н	-з	дыцәан (dә́cºan)	"he was sleeping."
Present	-уп	-у	дыцәоуп (dә́cºawp)	"he is sleeping."

Negation (stative)

The negation prefix m- occupies this position in a stative verb construction.

дтәам
d-t’ºa-m
(s)he-sit-NEG
"(S)he is not sitting."

Ending suffixes

The final position in the verb complex can accommodate any one of several mixed purpose markers.

Purpose	Suffix
Dynamic-finite	-ит (-jt')
Stative-finite	-п (-p')
Conditional	-р (-r)
Emphatic	-еи (-aj)
Interrogative	-ма (-ma)
Subjunctive	-аа(и)т//-заа(и)т (-aajt'//-zaajt')

The imperative takes a few possible forms, depending upon the type of verb. Dynamic verbs form the imperative by the addition of agreement suffixes to a bare verb stem; intransitives include the subject and indirect object makers, whereas transitives include the direct object and absolutive. Thus

шәихәаԥш
š˚-jә́-x˚a-pš
you:PL-him-look
"(you pl) look at him!"

Stative verbs form the imperative simply by adding the durative suffix -z to the verb stem. Thus

Уҟаз!
wә́-q’a-z
be-DUR
"be!"

Abkhaz lacks diathetic opposition, and as such there is no true passive voice distinction.

=== Nouns ===
Like verbs, Abkhaz nouns are formed by the addition of various prefixes and suffixes to a static noun stem. Noun stems can be derived according to several different processes, including compounding, reduplication, or the addition of a derivational affix.

The affixes mark number, definiteness and possession, as well as some case-like elements. Taken as a whole, the entire morphological structure of the Abkhaz noun is as follows:

[Definite Article]+[Inflectional Prefix]+[Quantity]+STEM+[Inflectional Suffix]+[Indefinite Article]+[Clitic]

As with verbs, not all of these elements can occur at the same time. The individual parts of noun morphology are addressed below.

Article affixes

There is a range of definiteness in Abkhaz. Those articles adhering to definite/generic categories appear as prefixes in the broader noun structure, whereas the indefinite is suffixed.

Affix	Category	Example
а-	Generic	ауаҩы́ (awajºә́ - "person")
а́-	Specific	уи а́уаҩы (wә́j áwajºә́ - "this person")
-к	Indefinite	уаҩы́к (wajºә́k - "some person")

The absence of either article affix implies a zero reference implying universal quantifiers, or to express the total lack of a referent.

Уаҩы дсымбеит
wajºә́ dsəmbáøjt
"I saw nobody."

Definite and indefinite affixes may appear together in the same noun, implying that the referents are meant as a group or body.

аҽқәа́к
ačkºák
"one of the horses."

There are some semantic differences in article usage between the different dialects of Abkhaz.

Inflectional prefixes

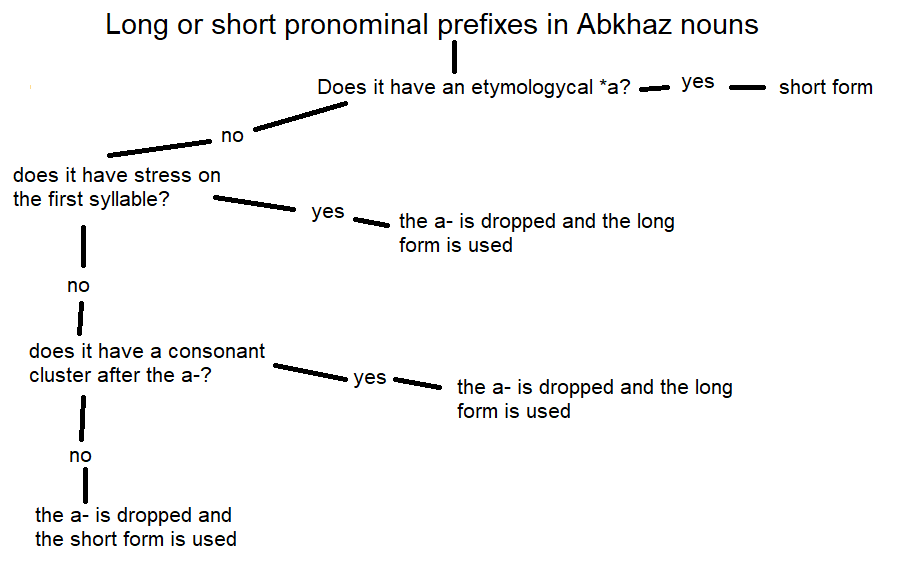
Pronominal prefixes in Abkhaz

These are possessive prefixes which express grammatical person and noun class. They come in two forms, the full and short ones. The full ones contain the vowels inside the parenthesis, whereas the short ones do not.

Person	Prefix
1st	с(ы)-
1st pl.	ҳ(а)-
2nd H:F	б(ы)-
2nd H:M	у-
2nd NH	у-
2nd pl.	шә(ы)-
3rd H:F	л(ы)-
3rd H:M	и-
3rd NH	а-
3rd pl.	р(ы)-

Quantifying prefixes

These few prefixes add numeric information to the noun complex. Often, this takes the form of a numeral.

рыхҩы-ԥацәа
rəxjºә́-pacºa
"their three (HC) sons"

Inflectional suffixes

These suffixes convey either plural number or case-like adverbial information. Plural markers are addressed further below; the other possible inflectional suffixes are the following:

- The third-person singular non-human possessive marker, attached to a locative or directional postposition
- Locative -ҿы́ (-č’ә́) or directional -хьы́ (-x’ә́) postpositions
- Instrumental suffix -ла (-la)
- Adverbial suffix -с (-s), as in: иашьас (jaš’ás - "as a brother")
- Comparative suffix -ҵас (-c’as), as in: ҩнҵа́с (jºənc’ás - "like a house")
- Privative suffix -да (-da), as in: ҩны́да (jºnә́da - "without a house")
- Various coordinating suffixes

Inflectional suffixes can follow each other sequentially.

аҷкәы́нцәеи аҭы́ԥҳацәеи
áč’k’ºəncºaj atә́phacºaj
"boys and girls"

Plural suffixes

Abkhaz distinguishes singular and plural; the singular is unmarked, whereas the plural is indicated by noun class-dependent suffixes. There are several pluralizing suffixes, but the two most commonly used refer generally to the human and non-human noun classes. There are instances where explicitly human nouns take non-human plural markers.

Suffix	Noun Class	Example
-цәа (-cºa)	Human	а́бацәа (ábacºa – "fathers")
-қәа (-kºa)	Non-human	аҽқәа́ (ačkºa - "horses")

There are also several plural endings that are of much narrower use.

Suffix	Example	Usage
-аа	а́ԥсуаа (ápswaa - "Abkhazians")	Collective, referring to ethnicities, groups
-(а)ра (-(a)ra)	аса́ра (asára - "lambs")	Collective, with the added meaning of animal young (in some nouns with -s ending)
-рaa (-raa)	а́браа (ábraa - "parents of the sister-in-law")	Delineating a group associated with the referent

Clitic

The clitic -гьы (-g’ə) functions as an in-built coordinating conjunction.

сангьы сабгьы
sáng’ə sábg’ə
"my mother and my father"

Noun class

Nouns in Abkhaz are classified broadly according to a human/non-human paradigm, with the human class itself further subdivided into masculine and feminine gender. Gender is a fairly weak concept in Abkhaz grammar, and gender distinctions undergo a fair degree of neutralization in several contexts, including personal pronouns, verb agreement and possession marking. This class and gender system distinguishes Abkhaz from the other Northwest Caucasian languages.

Vocative affixes

Although there is no special vocative declension, the prefix уа- (wa-), when attached to a noun stem, can express a vocative form.

Уанцәа́!
wancºá
"Oh Lord!"

Similarly, the suffix -a can be added to a proper noun ending in a consonant to communicate respect and endearment.

Зура́ба
zurába
"Dear Zurab" (given name)

=== Pronouns ===
Abkhaz is a pro-drop language. Pronouns are not inflected, and verbal agreement is generally sufficient to indicate grammatical person.

Person	Gender		Sing.	Pl.
1st			сарá	ҳарá
2nd	H	M	уарá	шәарá
2nd	H	F	барá	шәарá
2nd	NH		уарá	шәарá
3rd	H	M	иарá	дарá
3rd	H	F	ларá	дарá
3rd	NH		иарá	дарá

It is common in everyday speech to use a short version of the pronoun which omits the suffix -рá (-rá), although this is done less frequently with third-person pronouns.

In addition to noun-marking, possession can be indicated by adding the suffix -тәы́ (-t’˚ә́) to the short version of a personal pronoun. Thus:

стәы́ (st’˚ә́ - "mine")
лтәы́ (lt’˚ә́ - "hers")

Intensive pronouns are derived from short-form personal pronouns combined with the suffix -хаҭá (-xatá). These have a roughly reflexive meaning.

сарá (sará - "I")
схаҭá (sxatá - "I myself")

=== Adjectives ===
Morphologically, adjectives are very similar to nouns, differing only in their syntactic function. Similarly to nouns, adjective stems can be derived by compounding, reduplication and affixation. When used attributively, adjectives follow the noun that they modify. Predicative adjectives, or those derived by suffixation, precede the noun. Adjectives are formed according to the following paradigm:

[Definite Article]+[Inflectional Prefix]+STEM+[Inflectional Suffix]+[Indefinite Article]+[Adverbial Suffix]

Inflectional prefix

The possessive prefix r- is used to show possessive agreement.

рҭоурыхтә ҭагылазаашьа
rtawrә́xt’º tagә́lazaaš’a
"their historical situation"

Adjective suffixes

These suffixes are added to the adjective stem to show agreement with the noun being modified.

Agreement	Suffix
Intensive	-ӡа
Plural	-кәа (-k˚a)
Instrumental	-ла (-la)
Adverbial	-с (-s)
Comparative	-ҵас (-c’as)
Irreal	-шәа (-šºa)
Privative	-да (-da)

The comparative form of an adjective is formed using the comparative particle аиҳá (ajhá - "more"), which precedes the adjective. The superlative form is indicated by the intensifier suffix -ӡа. Thus:

аиҳа ибзиоу аҩны
ajhá jəbzә́jaw ajºnә́
"a better house"

иҟаԥшӡа
jəq’apšʒá
"reddest"

== Sample text ==
Article 1 of the Universal Declaration of Human Rights in Abkhaz:

Дарбанзаалак ауаҩы дшоуп ихы дақәиҭны. Ауаа зегь зинлеи патулеи еиҟароуп. Урҭ ирымоуп ахшыҩи аламыси, дара дарагь аешьеи аешьеи реиԥш еизыҟазароуп.

Transliterated:

Darbanzaalak’ auaiwy dshoup’ ikhy daqwitny. Auaa zegj zinlei pat’ulei eiqaroup’. Urt irymoup’ akhshyiwi alamysi, dara daragj aesjei aesjei reipsh eizyqazaroup’.

Transliterated conforming to ISO 9:

Darbanzaalak auaòy dšoup ihy dak̦a̋ițny. Auaa zegʹ zinlei patulei eik̄aroup. Urț irymoup ahšyòi alamysi, dara daragʹ aešʹei aešʹei reip̀š eizyk̄azaroup.

Phonetic transcription using the International Phonetic Alphabet:

[darbanzaːlakʼ awaɥɨ tʂəʊpʼ jɨχɨ dakʷʰitʰnɨ ǁ awaː zəgʲ zinləɪ pʼatʼwɨləɪ əɪqʼarəʊpʼ ǁ wərtʰ jɨrɨməʊpʼ aχʂɨɥiː alamɨsiː ǀ dara daragʲ ajəʃəɪ ajəʃəɪ rəɪpʰʂ əɪzɨqʼazarəʊpʼ ǁ]

Article 1 of the Universal Declaration of Human Rights in English:

"All human beings are born free and equal in dignity and rights. They are endowed with reason and conscience and should act towards one another in a spirit of brotherhood."

== Bibliography ==
- Chirikba, V. A. (1996). A Dictionary of Common Abkhaz. Leiden.
- Chirikba, V. A. (2003). Abkhaz. Languages of the World/Materials 119. Muenchen: Lincom Europa. ISBN 9783895861369.
- Dryer, Matthew S.; Haspelmath, Martin, eds. (2013). "Abkhaz language". World Atlas of Language Structures Online. Max Planck Institute for Evolutionary Anthropology.
- Hewitt, B. George (2010). Abkhaz: A Comprehensive Self-Tutor. München: Lincom Europa. ISBN 978-3-89586-670-8.
- Hewitt, B. George (1979). Abkhaz: A Descriptive Grammar. Amsterdam: North Holland.
- Hewitt, B. George (1989). "Abkhaz". In Greppin, John (ed.). The Indigenous Languages of the Caucasus. Vol. 2. New York: Caravan Books. pp. 39–88.
- Hewitt, B. George (2008). "Cases, arguments, verbs in Abkhaz, Georgian and Mingrelian". In Corbett, Greville G.; Noonan, Michael (eds.). Case and Grammatical Relations: Studies in Honor of Bernard Comrie. Philadelphia: John Benjamins. pp. 75–104.
- Hewitt, B. George (1999). "Morphology Revisited: Some Peculiarities of the Abkhaz Verb". In van den Berg, Helma (ed.). Studies in Caucasian Linguistics. Leiden: CNWS. pp. 197–208.
- Hewitt, B. George (1979). "The Relative Clause in Abkhaz (Abžui Dialect)". Lingua. 47 (2–3): 151–188. doi:10.1016/0024-3841(79)90034-2.
- Vaux, Bert; Psiypa, Zihni (1997). "The Cwyzhy Dialect of Abkhaz". In Kuno, Susumu; Vaux, Bert; Peter, Steve (eds.). Harvard Working Papers in Linguistics. Vol. 6. Cambridge, MA: Harvard University Linguistics Department.
