= Abkhaz alphabet =

Writing system of the Abkhaz language

The current Abkhaz alphabet is a modified variant of the Cyrillic script used for the Abkhaz language. Abkhaz was not a written language until the 19th century. Until then, Abkhazians—especially elites—had been using Greek (until c. 9th century), Georgian (9–19th centuries), and partially Turkish (18th century).

== History ==
The first Abkhaz alphabet was created in 1862 by Peter von Uslar. It had 55 letters and was based on the Cyrillic script. Another version, having 51 letters, was used in 1892 by Dimitry Gulia and K. Machavariani. In 1909, the alphabet was again expanded to 55 letters by Andria Tchotchua to adjust to the extensive consonantal inventory of Abkhaz.

In 1926, during the korenizatsiya policy in the Soviet Union, the Cyrillic alphabet was replaced by a Latin alphabet devised by Nikolay Marr. It featured 76 letters and was called the "Abkhaz analytical alphabet". In 1928, this was replaced by another Latin alphabet. From 1938 to 1954 the Abkhaz language was written in Georgian Mkhedruli script.

Since 1954, the Abkhaz language has been written in a new 58-letter (now 64-letter) Cyrillic alphabet (see chart below). Of these, 38 are graphically distinct; the rest are digraphs with ⟨ь⟩ and ⟨ә⟩ which indicate palatalization and labialization, respectively. In 1996, the most recent reform of the alphabet was implemented: while labialization had hitherto been marked with two additional letters, ә and у (у was used in the digraphs гу, ҕу, ку, қу, ҟу, and ху, which were not considered separate letters), since then only ә was retained in this function. Unusually, the Cyrillic plosive letters к п т represent ejective consonants; the non-ejectives (pulmonic consonants) are derived from these by means of a descender at the bottom of the letter. In the case of the affricates, however, the plain letters are pulmonic, and the derived letters ejective.

The modern Abkhaz orthography gives preference to the letters г к п т х ч with descender (ӷ қ ԥ ҭ ҳ ҷ). The letters (ҕ ҧ) had previously (before 1996) had a hook, which ҕ still does in Yakut. In pre-Soviet alphabets the hook was also used in ӄ ꚋ, see above.

The letters ь and ә are used as parts of digraphs, but are listed separately in the alphabet. Besides the digraphs listed in the alphabet, the letter ь occurs in ль /lʲ/, which is used in some loanwords.

== Comparison table ==
Letters or digraphs in brackets are not part of the alphabet. Letters without a modern equivalent represent phonemes only present in the Bzyb dialect, as the literary standard dialect switched from Bzyb to Abzhywa.

Different iterations of the Abkhaz Cyrillic alphabet and transliteration systems
Modern Cyrillic	Name	Georgian script	Soviet Latin script	Analytical alphabet	Translation committee	Zavadsky alphabet	Uslar alphabet	ISO	TITUS (Chirikba, where different)	IPA Value
А а	а	ა	a	a	а	А а	а	a	а	/a/
Б б	бы	ბ	b	b	б	Б б	б	b	b	/b/
В в	вы	ვ	v	v	в	В в	в	v	v	/v/
Г г	гы	გ	g	g	г	Г г	г	g	g	/ɡ/
Гь гь	гьы	გჲ	(gı)	gˌ	г˘	Гј гј	(гј)	gʹ	gʹ	/ɡʲ/
Гә гә (pre-1996: Гу гу)	гәы	(გუ)	(gu)	g˚	(гу)	(гу)	(гу)	ga̋	gᵒ	/ɡʷ/
Ӷ ӷ (pre-1996: Ҕ ҕ)	ӷы	ღ	ƣ	ǧ	ҕ	г̓	г̓	ğ	ɣ	/ʁ/
Ӷь ӷь (pre-1996: Ҕь ҕь)	ӷьы	ღჲ	(ƣı)	ǧˌ	ҕ̆	(г̓ј)	(г̓ј)	ğʹ	ɣʹ	/ʁʲ/
Ӷә ӷә (pre-1996: Ҕу ҕу)	ӷәы	(ღუ)	(ƣu)	ǧ˚	(ҕу)	(г̓у)	(г̓у)	ğa̋	ɣᵒ	/ʁʷ/
Д д	ды	დ	d	d	д	Д д	д	d	d	/d/
Дә дә	дәы	დჿ	đ	d˚	ꚁ	Д’д’	д̓	da̋	dᵒ	/dʷ/
Е е	е	ე	e	e	е	Е е	е	e	e	/e/
Ж ж	жы	ჟჾ	ƶ	ȷ	ж	Ж ж	ж	ž	ž	/ʐ/
Жь жь	жьы	ჟ		ȷˌ	ӂ	Жј жј	(жј)	žʹ	žʹ	/ʒ/
Жә жә	жәы	ჟჿ	j	ȷ˚	ꚅ	Ꚅ ꚅ	ꚅ	ža̋	žᵒ	/ʒʷ/
				ȷˌ˚	ꚅ̆	ꚅ̓	ꚅ̓			/ʑʷ/
З з	зы	ზ	z	z	з	З з	з	z	z	/z/
				ⱬ						/ʑ/
Ӡ ӡ	ӡы	ძ	ᴣ	ď	ӡ	ꚉ	ꚉ	ź	ʒ	/d͡z/
				ďˌ						/d͡ʑ/
Ӡә ӡә	ӡәы	ძჿ	ⱬ	ď˚	ꚃ	ꚃ	ꚃ	źa̋	ʒᵒ	/d͡ʑʷ/
И и	Иы	ი	i	i	і	І і	і	i	i, j	/j(i), i(:)/
				y		Ј ј	ј			/j/
К к	кы	კ	ⱪ	k	к	К к	к	k	ḳ (kʼ)	/kʼ/
Кь кь	кьы	კჲ	(ⱪı)	ⱪ	к̆	(кј)	(кј)	kʹ	ḳʹ (kʼʹ)	/kʲʼ/
Кә кә (pre-1996: Ку ку)	кәы	(კუ)	(ⱪu)	k˚	(ку)	(ку)	(ку)	ka̋	ḳᵒ (kʼᵒ)	/kʷʼ/
Қ қ	қы	ქ	k	q	ӄ	к̓	к̓	ķ	k	/k/
Қь қь	қьы	ქჲ	(kı)	qˌ	ӄ̆	(к̓ј)	(к̓ј)	ķʹ	kʹ	/kʲ/
Қә қә (pre-1996: Ӄу ӄу)	қәы	(ქუ)	(ku)	q˚	(ӄу)	(к̓у)	(к̓у)	ķa̋	kᵒ	/kʷ/
Ҟ ҟ	ҟы	ყ	q	k̇	ԛ	ԛ	ԛ	k̄	q̇ (qʼ)	/qʼ/
Ҟь ҟь	ҟьы	ყჲ	(qı)	ⱪ̇	q̆	(ԛј)	(ԛј)	k̄ʹ	q̇ʹ (qʼʹ)	/qʲʼ/
Ҟә ҟә (pre-1996: Ҟу ҟу)	ҟәы	(ყუ)	(qu)	k̇˚	(ԛу)	(ԛу)	(ԛу)	k̄a̋	q̇ᵒ (qʼᵒ)	/qʷʼ/
Л л	лы	ლ	l	l	л	Л л	л	l	l	/l/
М м	мы	მ	m	m	м	М м	м	m	m	/m/
Н н	ны	ნ	n	n	н	Н н	н	n	n	/n/
О о	о	ო	o	o	о	О о	о	o	o	/o/
П п	пы	პ		p	п	П п	п	p	ṗ (pʼ)	/pʼ/
Ԥ ԥ (pre-1996: Ҧ ҧ)	ԥы	ფ	p		ҧ	п̓	п̓	ṕ	p	/pʰ/
Р р	ры	რ	r	r	р	Р р	р	r	r	/r/
С с	сы	ს	s	s	с	С с	с	s	s	/s/
				sˌ		Ҫҫ	ҫ			/ɕ/
Т т	ты	ტ		t	т	Т т	т	t	ṭ (tʼ)	/tʼ/
Тә тә	тәы	ტჿ		t˚	ꚍ̆	Ꚍ̆ ꚍ̆	ꚍ̆	ta̋	ṭᵒ (tʼᵒ)	/tʷʼ/
Ҭ ҭ	ҭы	თ	t	ϑ	ꚋ	т̓	т̓	ţ	t	/tʰ/
Ҭә ҭә	ҭәы	თჿ		ϑ˚	ꚍ	Ꚍ ꚍ	ꚍ	ţa̋	tᵒ	/tʷʰ/
У у	уы	უ	u	w	у	У у	у	u	w, u	/u(ː),w(ɵ)/
Ф ф	фы	ჶ	f	f	ф	Ф ф	ф	f	f	/f/
Х х	хы	ხ	x	q̇	х	Х х	х	h	x	/χ/
Хь хь	хьы	ხჲ	(xı)	q̇ˌ	х̆	(хј)	(хј)	hʹ	xʹ	/χʲ/
Хә хә (pre-1996: Ху ху)	хәы	(ხუ)	(xu)	q̇˚	(ху)	(ху)	(ху)	ha̋	xᵒ	/χʷ/
				q̱̇		х̍	х̍			/χˤ/
				q̱̇˚		(х̍у)	(х̍у)			/χˤʷ/
Ҳ ҳ	ҳы	ჰ	h	ħ	һ	Һ һ	һ	h̦	ḥ (h)	/ħ/
Ҳә ҳә	ҳәы	ჰჿ	ħ	ħ˚	ꚕ	Ꚕ ꚕ	ꚕ	h̦a̋	ḥᵒ (hᵒ)	/ħʷ/
Ц ц	цы	ც	c	ϑ̇	ц	Ц ц	ц	c	c	/t͡sʰ/
				ϑ̇ˌ		ц̍	ц̍			/t͡ɕ/
Цә цә	цәы	ცჿ		ϑ̇˚	ꚏ	ꚏ	ꚏ	ca̋	cᵒ	/t͡ɕʷʰ/
Ҵ ҵ	ҵы	წ		ṫ	ҵ	ц̓	ц̓	c̄	c̣ (cʼ)	/t͡sʼ/
Ҵә ҵә	ҵәы	წჿ		ṫ˚	ꚏ̆	ꚏ̆	ꚏ̆	c̄a̋	c̣ᵒ (cʼᵒ)	/t͡ɕʷʼ/
				ṫˌ		т̨	т̨			/t͡ɕʼ/
Ч ч	чы	ჩ	ɥ	ϑ̣	ч	Ч ч	ч	č	čʹ	/t͡ʃʰ/
Ҷ ҷ	ҷы	ჭ		ṭ	ꚓ	ч̓	ч̓	c̦	č̣ʹ (čʼʹ)	/t͡ʃʼ/
Ҽ ҽ	ҽы	ჩჾ		ϑ̱̣	ҽ	ꚇ	ꚇ	c̆	č	/ʈ͡ʂʰ/
Ҿ ҿ	ҿы	ჭჾ		ṯ̣	ҽ̆	ꚇ̆	ꚇ̆	̦c̆	č̣ (čʼ)	/ʈ͡ʂʼ/
Ш ш	шы	შჾ		ш	ш	ш	ш	š	š	/ʂ/
Шь шь	шьы	შ	ſ	щ	ш̆	Ш̆ ш̆	ш̆	šʹ	šʹ	/ʃ/
Шә шә	шәы	შჿ		ш˚	ꚗ	щ	щ	ša̋	šᵒ	/ʃʷ/
				щ˚	ꚗ̆	щ̆	щ̆			/ɕʷ/
Ы ы	ы	ჷ	ə	ə	ѵ	Ѵ ѵ	ѵ	y	ə	/ɨ/
Ҩ ҩ	ҩы	ჳ	y	w̧	ҩ	Ҩ ҩ	ҩ	ò	ʿᵒ (jᵒ)	/ɥ/
Џ џ	џы	ჯჾ		ḓ	џ			d̂	ǯ	/ɖ͡ʐ/
Џь џь	џьы	ჯ	ꝗ	ḏ̣	џ̆	џ	џ	d̂	ǯʹ	/d͡ʒ/
Ь ь		ჲ	ı			ј	ј	ʹ		/◌ʲ/
Ә ә		უ	(u)			у	у	a̋		/◌ʷ/

== Text comparison ==
Article 1 of the Universal Declaration of Human Rights:

Cyrillic script	Uslar Cyrillic	Translation Committee	Georgian script	Latin script (ISO 9)	IPA transcription	English translation
Дарбанзаалак ауаҩы дшоуп ихы дақәиҭны. Ауаа зегь зинлеи патулеи еиҟароуп. Урҭ ирымоуп ахшыҩи аламыси, дара дарагь аешьеи аешьеи реиԥш еизыҟазароуп.	Дарбанзаалак ауаҩѵ дшоуп іхѵ дак̓уіт̓нѵ. Ауаа зегј зінлеі патулеі еіԛароуп. Урт̓ ірѵмоуп ахшѵҩі аламѵсі, дара дарагј аеш̆еі аеш̆еі реіп̓ш еізѵԛазароуп.	Дарбанзаалак ауаҩѵ дшоуп іхѵ даӄуіꚋнѵ. Ауаа зег̆ зінлеі патулеі еіԛароуп. Урꚋ ірѵмоуп ахшѵҩі аламѵсі, дара дараг̆ аеш̆еі аеш̆еі реіҧш еізѵԛазароуп.	დარბანზაალაკ აუაჳჷ დშოუპ იხჷ დაქჿითნჷ. აუაა ზეგჲ ზინლეი პატულეი ეიყაროუპ. ურთ ირჷმოუპ ახშჷჳი ალამჷსი, დარა დარაგჲ აეშჲეი აეშჲეი რეიფშ ეიზჷყაზაროუპ.	Darbanzaalak auaòy dšoup ihy daķãiţny. Auaa zegʹ zinlei patulei eik̄aroup. Urţ irymoup ahšyòi alamysi, dara daragʹ aešʹei aešʹei reipš eizyk̄azaroup.	[dɑɾbɑnzɑːlɑkʼ ɑwɑɥˤə tʂɑwəpʼ jəχə dɑkʷʰəjtʰnə ǁ ɑwɑː zɑjəgʲ zɑjənlɑjə pʼatʼəwlɑjə jɑjəqʼɑɾɑwəpʼ ǁ wəɾtʰ jəɾəmɑwəpʼ ɑχʂəɥˤəj ɑlɑməsəj | dɑɾɑ dɑɾɑgʲ ɑjɑʃɑjə ɾɑjəpʰʂ ɑjəzəqʼɑzɑɾɑwəpʼ ǁ]	All human beings are born free and equal in dignity and rights. They are endowed with reason and conscience and should act towards one another in a spirit of brotherhood.

== Gallery ==
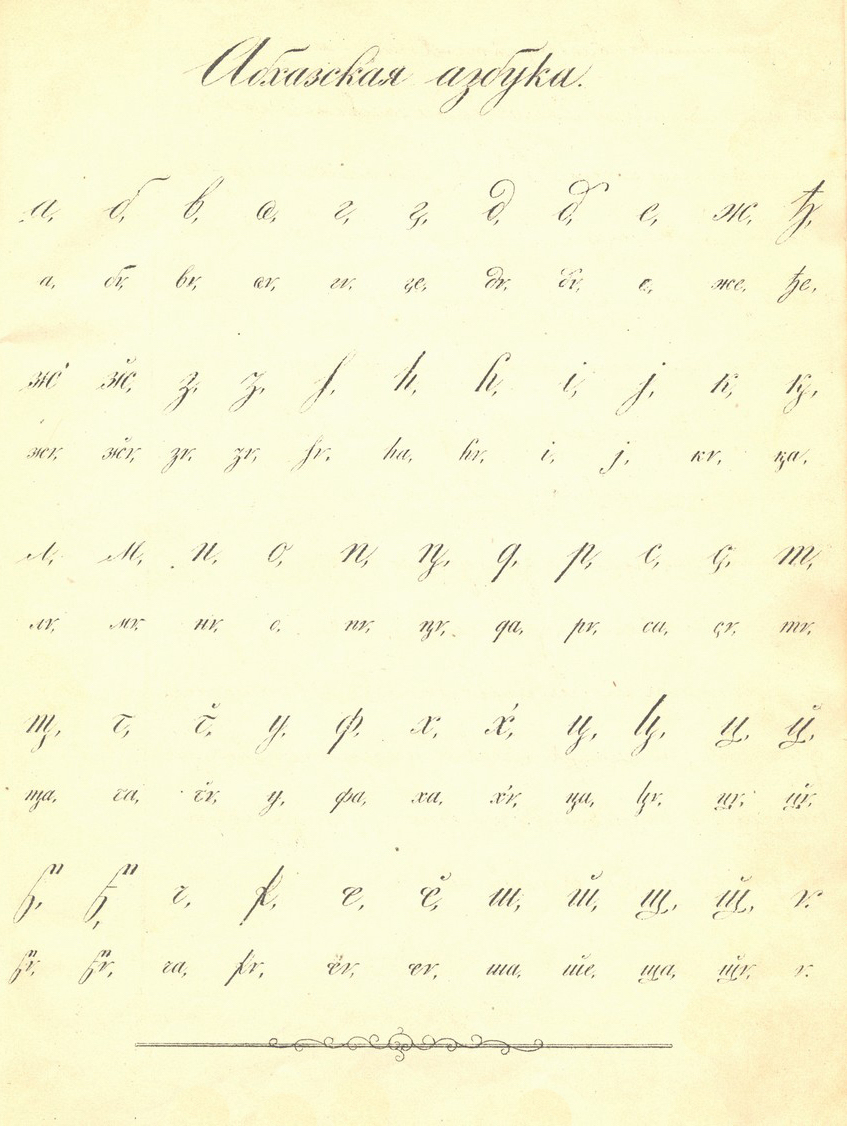
The original 1862 script by Uslar

1888 script modified by Mikhail Romualdovich Zavadsky

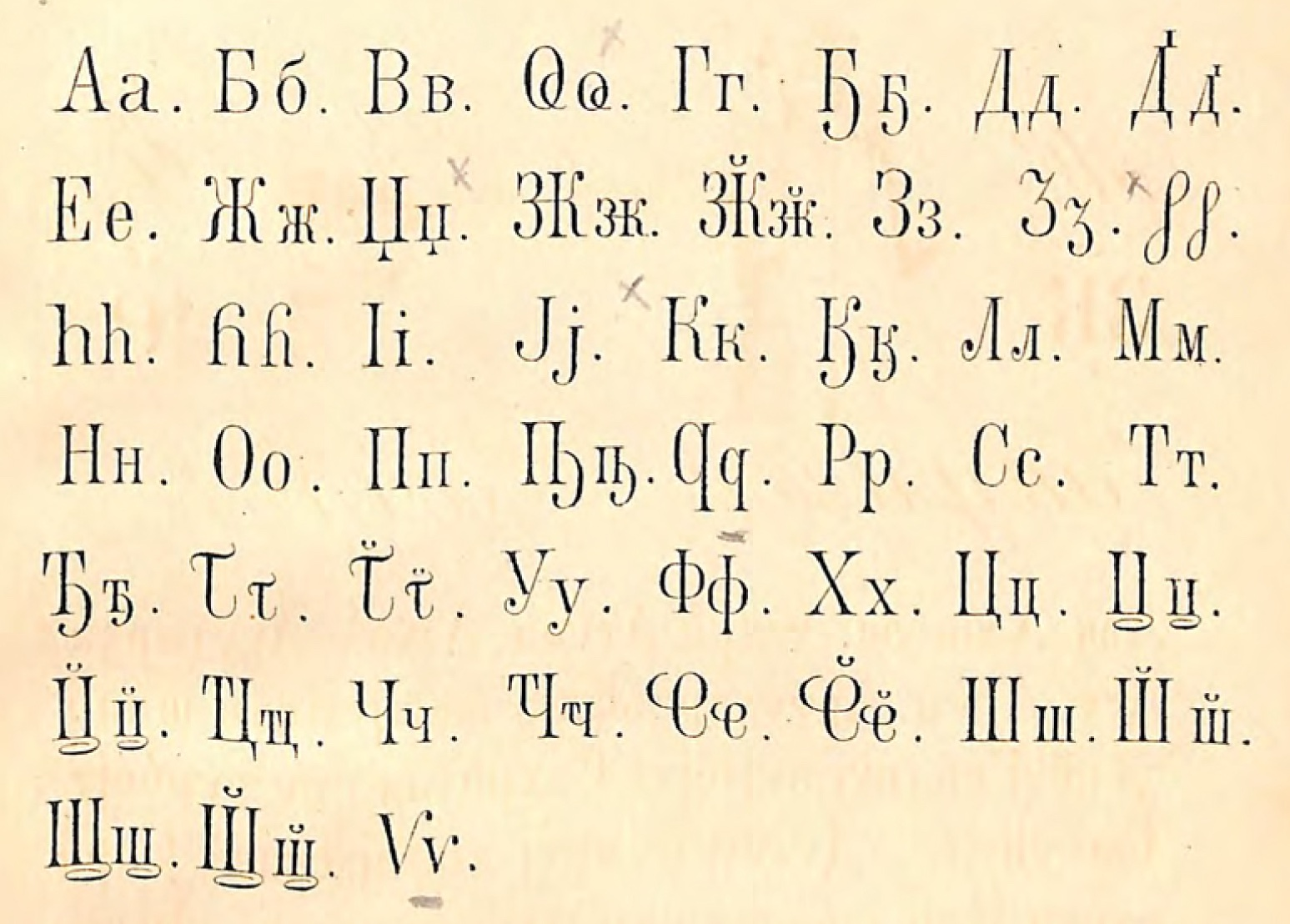
The 1892 script by Gulia and Machiavariani.

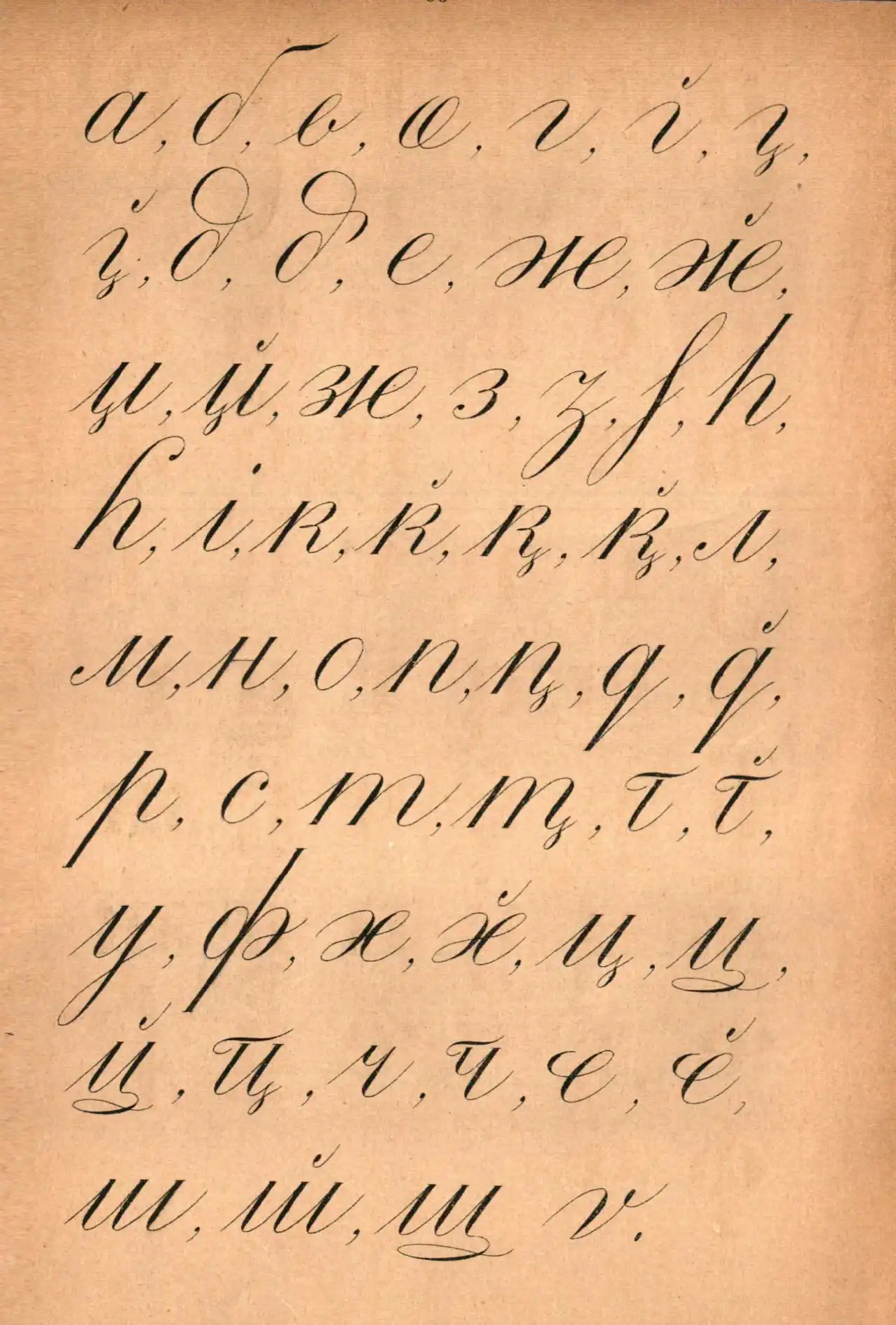
The expanded 1909 alphabet by Andria Chochua.

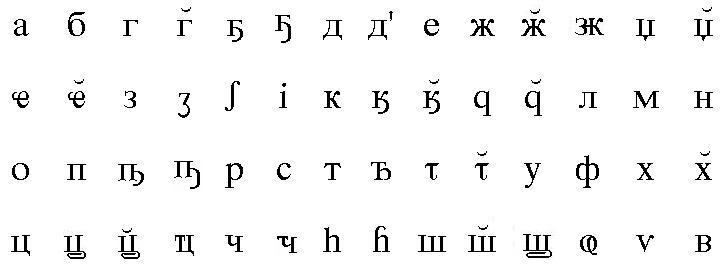
1925 version of the script by Chochua.

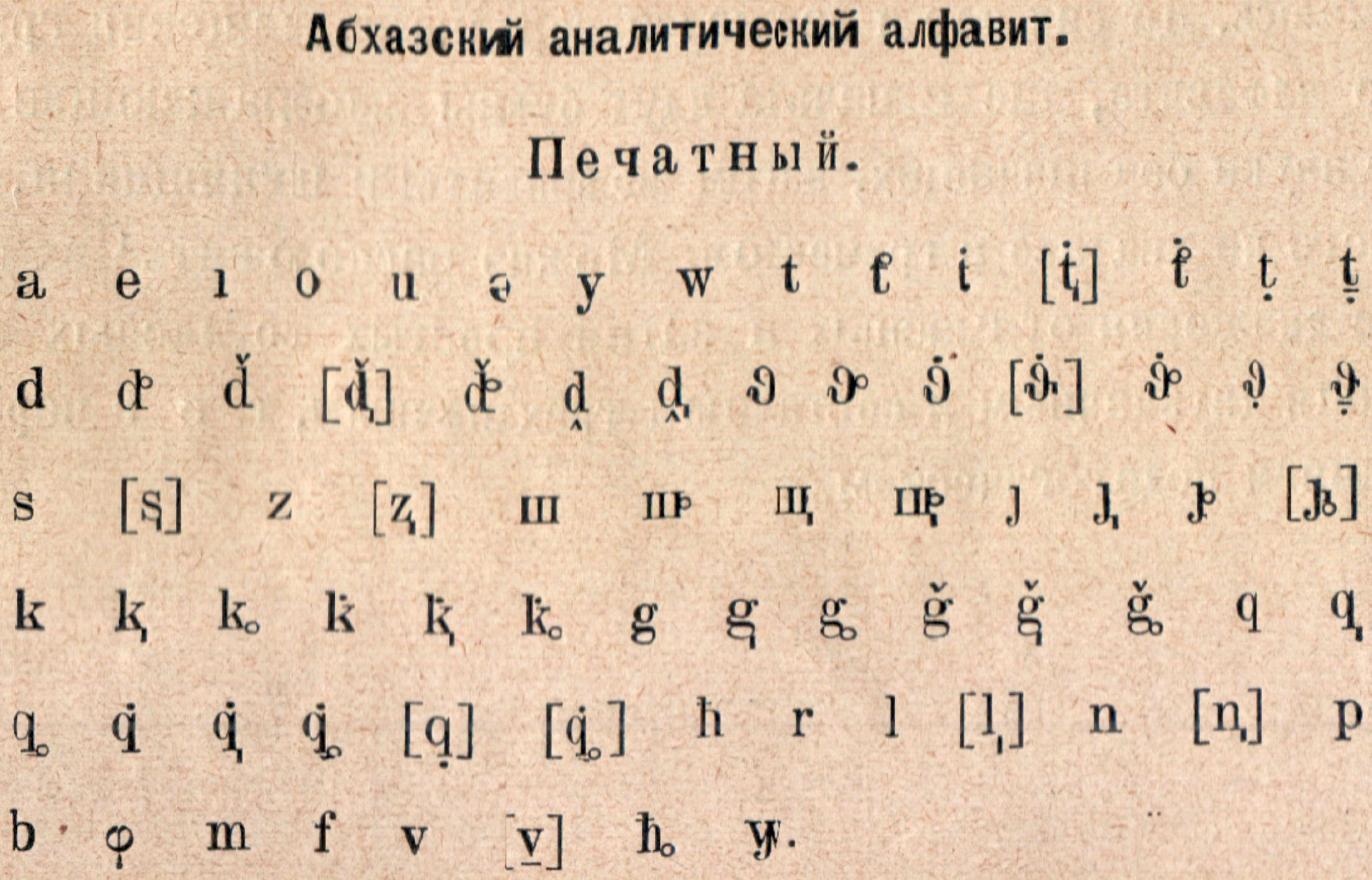
The Abkhaz Latin alphabet used 1926–1928 designed by Nicholas Marr

The Abkhaz Latin alphabet used 1928–1938 with corresponding Cyrillic and IPA transcriptions.

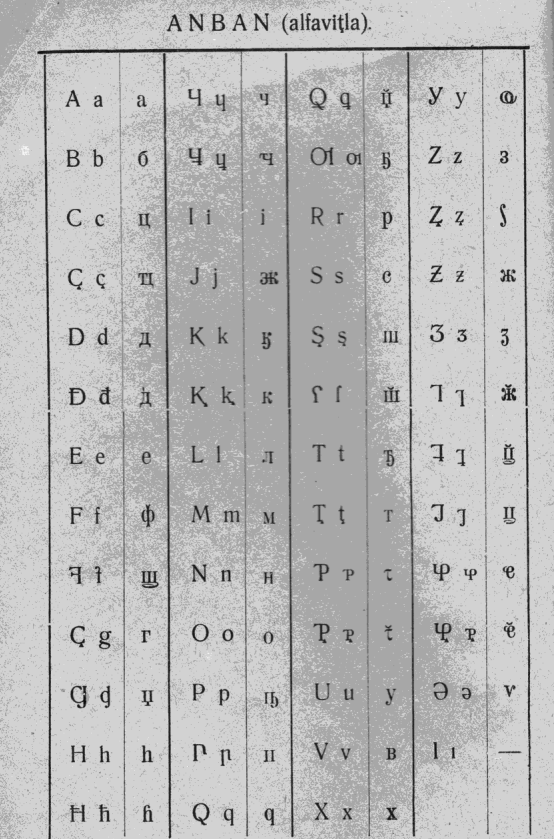
1930 Abkhaz Latin alphabet with corresponding Cyrillic letters.

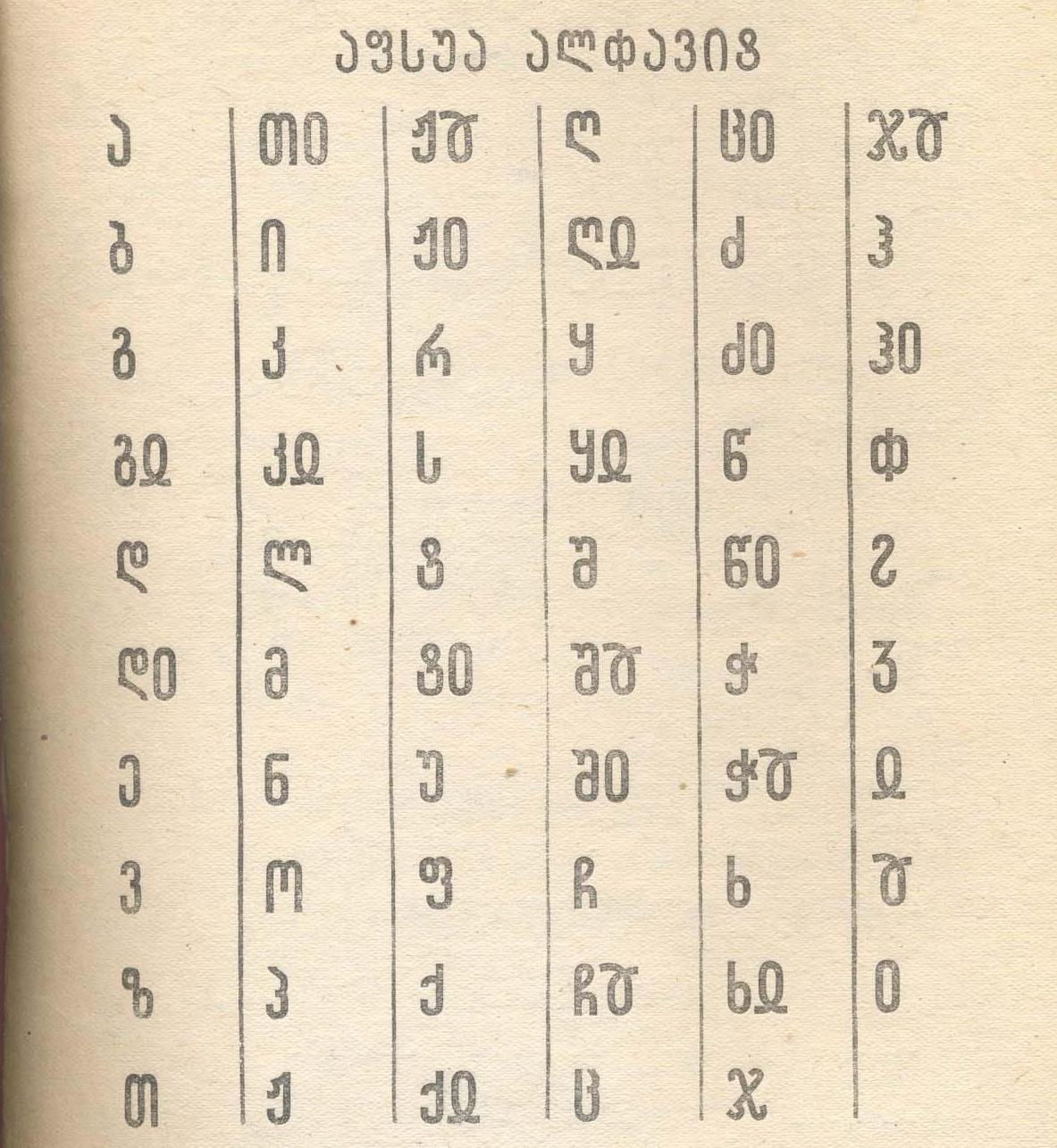
Abkhaz alphabet which was based on Georgian script and used from 1938 to 1953.

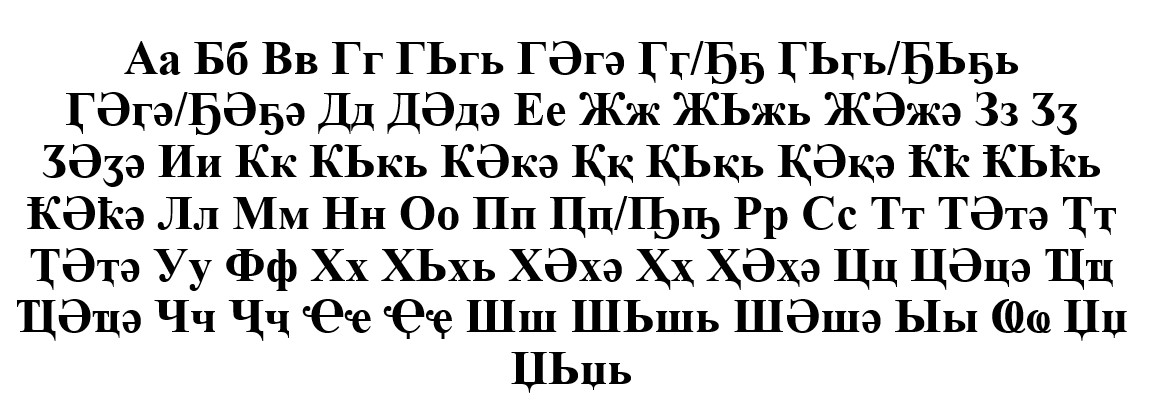
The current Abkhaz alphabet (This includes old ones such as Ҕ which was replaced with Ӷ)

== See also ==
- Dzze
- Zhwe
- Cche
- Tswe
- Shwe (Cyrillic)
- o-hook
