= Adyghe alphabet =

West Circassian alphabet

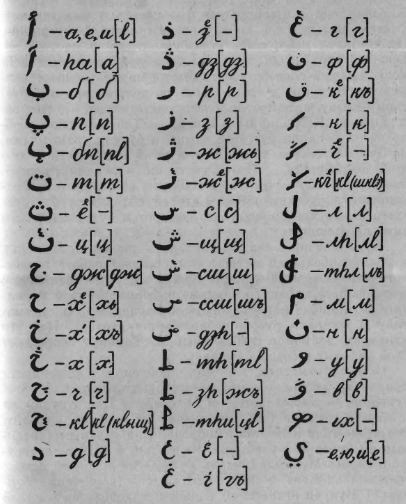
Bersey's alphabet (1855)

The Adyghe alphabet is the writing system used to write the Adyghe language. Over the course of its existence, it has changed its graphic basis several times and has been repeatedly reformed. Currently, the Adyghe script functions on the basis of the Cyrillic alphabet.

== Modern alphabet ==
Adyghe alphabet
А а [aː]	Б б [b]	В в [v]	Г г [ɣ]	Гу гу [ɡʷ]	Гъ гъ [ʁ]	Гъу гъу [ʁʷ]	Д д [d]
Дж дж [d͡ʒ]	Дз дз [d͡z]	Дзу дзу [d͡ʐʷ]	Е е [ja/aj]	Ё ё [jo]	Ж ж [ʒ]	Жъ жъ [ʐ]	Жъу жъу [ʐʷ]
Жь жь [ʑ]	З з [z]	И и [jə/əj]	Й й [j]	К к [k]	Ку ку [kʷ]	Къ къ [q]	Къу къу [qʷ]
Кӏ кӏ [t͡ʃʼ]	Кӏу кӏу [kʷʼ]	Л л [ɮ] or [l]	Лъ лъ [ɬ]	Лӏ лӏ [ɬʼ]	М м [m]	Н н [n]	О о [aw/wa]
П п [p]	Пӏ пӏ [pʼ]	Пӏу пӏу [pʷʼ]	Р р [r]	С с [s]	Т т [t]	Тӏ тӏ [tʼ]	Тӏу тӏу [tʷʼ]
У у [w/əw]	Ф ф [f]	Х х [x]	Ху ху [xʷ]	Хъ хъ [χ]	Хъу хъу [χʷ]	Хь хь [ħ]	Ц ц [t͡s]
Цу цу [t͡ʂʷ]	Цӏ цӏ [t͡sʼ]	Ч ч [t͡ʃ]	Чӏ чӏ [t͡ʂʼ]	Чъ чъ [t͡ʂ]	Ш ш [ʃ]	Шъ шъ [ʂ]	Шъу шъу [ʂʷ]
Шӏ шӏ [ʂʼ]	Шӏу шӏу [ʂʷʼ]	Щ щ [ɕ]	Ъ ъ [ˠ]	Ы ы [ə]	Ь ь [ʲ]	Э э [a]	Ю ю [ju]
Я я [jaː]	Ӏ ӏ [ʔ]	Ӏу ӏу [ʔʷ]					

The treatment of the letter palochka varies. Some documents use it as a caseless letter, while others use it as a casing letter.

The Adyghe alphabet contains some inconsistencies between visual representation and pronunciation which can be a point of confusion for learners. It is tempting to read the Circassian alphabet letters phonologically, but this is not always accurate. For example:

- While the letter Кӏ appears to represent [kʼ], it is actually pronounced as [t͡ʃʼ] (ЧӀ).
- Чӏ is pronounced as the retroflex [t͡ʂʼ] (Чӏъ).
- Цу is pronounced as [t͡ʂʷ] (Чъу).
- Шӏ is pronounced as [ʂʼ] (Шӏъ).
- Шӏу is pronounced as [ʂʷʼ] (Шӏъу).
- The letter Г represents the fricative [ɣ] rather than the stop [ɡ].
- The labialized Гу corresponds to the stop [ɡʷ].

Adyghe Dialectal letters
Гь гь [ɡʲ]	Джь джь [ɡʲ]	Кь кь [kʲ]	Кӏь кӏь [kʲʼ]	Сӏ сӏ [sʼ]	Ӏь ӏь [ʔʲ]

These letters are not part of the official alphabet, but they may appear in books that showcase the different dialects.

There are thirteen labialised consonants; however, in some dialects, there are three additional ones: Кхъу [q͡χʷ], Ху [xʷ] and Чъу [t͡ɕʷ].

=== Orthography rules ===
- The letter ⟨ы⟩ [ə] is not written after a ⟨у⟩ [w], ⟨й⟩ [j] or a labialised consonant. For example: унэ [wənɐ] "house" instead of уынэ.
- In case the letter ⟨у⟩ is the first letter of a word or when it is not related to any other consonant, it is pronounced as [wə] ⟨уы⟩. For example: унэ instead of уынэ. When it is related to a consonant, it becomes a vowel and pronounced as [əw~u] ⟨ыу⟩. For example: чэту [t͡ʃɐtəw] 'cat' instead of чэтыу.
- In case a labialised consonant is followed by a vowel ⟨э⟩ [ɐ], instead of the letter ⟨у⟩ there is a ⟨о⟩. For example: гъогу [ʁʷɐɡʷ] 'road' instead of гъуэгу.
- In case a labialised consonant is followed by a vowel ⟨а⟩ [aː] or ⟨и⟩ [əj~i], the labialised consonant letter is written fully. For example: цуакъэ [t͡sʷaːqɐ] 'shoes'.
- In case the letter ⟨о⟩ is the first letter of a word or when it is not related to any other consonant, it is pronounced as [wɐ] ⟨уэ⟩. For example, о [wɐ] 'you' instead of уэ.
- In case the letter ⟨е⟩ is the first letter of a word or when it is not related to any other consonant, it is pronounced as [jɐ] ⟨йэ⟩. For example: еӀо [jɐʔʷɐ] 'he says' instead of йэӀо. When it is related to a consonant, it becomes a vowel and pronounced as [ɐj~e] ⟨эй⟩. For example: делэ [dɐjlɐ] 'fool' instead of дэйлэ.
- In case the letter ⟨и⟩ is the first letter of a word or when is not related to any other consonant, it is pronounced as [jə] ⟨йы⟩. For example: илъэс [jəɬɐs] 'year' instead of йылъэс. When it is related to a consonant, it becomes a vowel and pronounced as [əj~i] ⟨ый⟩. For example: сиӀ [səjʔ] 'I have' instead of сыйӀ.

=== Use of Ъ and Ь ===
Unlike in the Russian language, where Ъ (Hard Sign) and Ь (Soft Sign) serve to separate syllables or modify the palatalization of a preceding consonant, in Adyghe they are used as integral parts of the alphabet to define entirely distinct phonemes. This adaptation was necessary because Adyghe has a much larger consonant inventory than standard Cyrillic can accommodate.

- Ъ (Hardener): Generally indicates a moving the place of articulation back to the uvular or pharyngeal position (e.g., turning a velar into a uvular).
- Ь (Softener): Generally indicates a moving the place of articulation forward or palatalization.

The table below illustrates how these signs modify the base letters:

Base	+ Hardener (Ъ)	+ Softener (Ь)
Г [ɣ] (Velar fricative)	Гъ [ʁ] (Uvular fricative)	—
Ж [ʒ] (Postalveolar fricative)	Жъ [ʐ] (Retroflex fricative)	Жь [ʑ] (Alveolo-palatal fricative)
К [k] (Velar plosive)	Къ [q] (Uvular plosive)	—
Л [l] (Alveolar lateral)	Лъ [ɬ] (Lateral fricative)	—
Х [x] (Velar fricative)	Хъ [χ] (Uvular fricative)	Хь [ħ] (Pharyngeal fricative)
Ч [t͡ʃ] (Postalveolar affricate)	Чъ [t͡ʂ] (Retroflex affricate)	—
Ш [ʃ] (Postalveolar fricative)	Шъ [ʂ] (Retroflex fricative)	—

=== Vowels ===
The vowels are written ⟨ы⟩ [ə], ⟨э⟩ [ɐ] and ⟨а⟩ [aː]. Other letters represent diphthongs: ⟨я⟩ represents [jaː], ⟨и⟩ [jə] or [əj], ⟨о⟩ [wɐ] or [ɐw], ⟨у⟩ represent [wə] or [əw], and ⟨е⟩ represents [jɐ] or [ɐj].

== Other writing systems ==
=== History ===
Widespread literacy in Adyghe did not exist until the modern era and literacy was limited to a few people. From the 6th–5th centuries BC until the first half of the 15th century, the Adyghe people used the Greek alphabet, initially introduced through ancient Greek colonies and later reinforced by the Byzantine Empire and the Christian church. Early forms of the Cyrillic alphabet were also used during this period due to Russian influence. During the 13th to 15th centuries, the development of relations with the Genoese Republic led to some use of the Italian (Latin) script. In the 14th century, along with Islam, the Arabic script was adopted for Adyghe. It was referred to as Ajam, a writing system for the native language based on the Perso-Arabic script. Since Adyghe has many more consonants than Arabic, the Ajam system required adding special diacritical marks or inventing new letters to represent sounds. Early attempts to write Adyghe in modern Cyrillic started as early as 1829 and were followed by similar attempts.

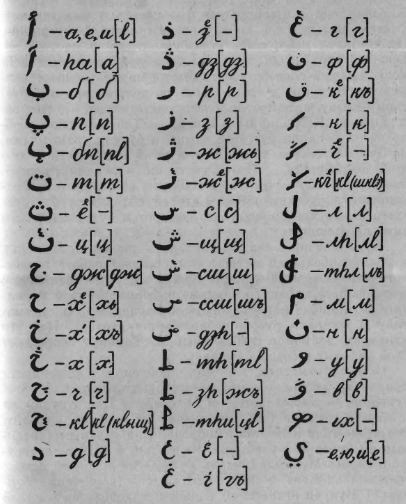
Bersey's alphabet (1855)

In 1853, the Adyghe educator Umar Bersey published the first "Primer of the Circassian Language" based on the Arabic script. Over the following decades, several authors attempted to further improve the Adyghe Arabic orthography. The most successful attempt was the alphabet created by Akhmetov Bekukh. In this version, letters were designated for vowel sounds, and the orthography was transformed from an "Impure abjads to a true alphabet. In 1918, on the initiative of the Kuban Revolutionary Committee, a primer was published in Yekaterinodar. This official endorsement resulted in a literary boom in Adyghe and the publication of various newspapers, textbooks and other literature, including the Adyghe Maq, the main Adyghe language newspaper established in 1923. During the abovementioned decades, parallel with this process, the Perso-Arabic orthography had also been standardized for the sister Circassian language of Kabardian. Although very similar in many aspects, there were minor variations, in which letters were included based on each respective phonology, and there were minor differences in presentation of a few consonants as well. The Arabic script was used until 1927, when as a part of the Soviet "Latinisation" campaign, a Latin-based alphabet was adopted. It was developed by the linguist N.F. Yakovlev and the Adyghe scholar Daud Ashkhamaf. In the late 1930s, the script was converted to Cyrillic to align with Russian.

In the diaspora, a new Latin alphabet based on the Turkish alphabet was designed to better facilitate Adyghe and Kabardian education in Turkey.

History of Modern Circassian Alphabets and Writing Systems
Date	Author / Creator	Script Base	Description & Historical Context
17th Century	Evliya Çelebi	Arabic / Ottoman	Recorded Adyghe linguistic material in his travel notes.
c. 1820s (Early 19th Century)	Sheretluk Hadji-Notauk (Magomet Effendi)	Arabic	A Shapsug nobleman educated in the "Arab East", considered the founder of the Adyghe Enlightenment. He opened a school on the Bogundyr River and created one of the first Arabic-based Circassian grammars. However, he burned his manuscripts, either by force or out of his own will.
1830s	Sultan Khan-Giray	Cyrillic	Adapted the Cyrillic alphabet for his ethnographic work "Notes on Circassia" to record Circassian legends.
1840–1843	Shora Nogmov (Нэгъумэ Шорэ)	Cyrillic / Arabic	A Kabardian noble who initially developed a Cyrillic alphabet (1840) before switching to Arabic/Persian (1843).
1846	Leonty Lyulye	Cyrillic	Published a dictionary using a modified Russian alphabet. Criticized by Pyotr Uslar for failing to reflect phonetics.
1853	Umar Bersey	Arabic	Published the "Primer of the Circassian Language" in Tiflis on March 14, 1853. This date is celebrated as the "Day of the Adyghe Language and Writing."
1860s	Kazi Atazhukin & Pyotr Uslar	Cyrillic	Developed a Kabardian alphabet based on Cyrillic, believing the Russian script was politically and practically suitable for Caucasian languages.
1897	Tharxet Ahmet Cavit Pasha	Arabic	Created an alphabet later used in the newspaper Ghuaze (The Guide), published by the Circassian Union and Mutual Aid Society (1908–1923).
1902–1912	Various Diaspora Authors	Arabic / Latin	Various attempts in the Ottoman diaspora: 1902 Dr. Pçehatluk Mehmet Ali (Draft); 1905: Majid Fenziy (Cyrillic/Arabic); 1909: Neğuç Yusuf Suat & Tsağo Ahmet Nuri (*Adıge Alfabesi*); 1910: Huaj Kemal (Arabic); 1910s: Şemsettin Bey (Çerkez Hattı); 1910s: Yusuf İzzet Pasha (Mixed/Invented "Kuban" script); 1912: Dr. Pçehatluk Mehmet Ali (Latin, Adıge elifbe)
1918	Seferbiy Siyukhov (S. Siyukhov) / Ahmed Bekukh	Arabic	Siyukhov prepared an alphabet for the Adyghe (West) dialect, officially adopted for teaching and publishing. It remained in use until 1927.
1918–1929	Blanau Batok	Latin / Arabic	Published a Latin primer (Çerkes Alfab) in Constantinople (1919) and an Arabic primer (Elifba El-Şerkesiyye) in Damascus (1929).
1923	N. F. Yakovlev	Cyrillic	A Cyrillic project proposed by Yakovlev prior to the shift toward Latinization.
1927	N. F. Yakovlev & D. A. Ashkhamaf	Latin (Adyghe)	Officially adopted for the West Circassian (Adyghe) language by the Regional Department of Public Education. It established the Chemguy dialect as the literary standard.
1936	T'ut'e Borikey	Cyrillic	Early transition to Cyrillic for Kabardian.
1937–1938	N. F. Yakovlev & D. A. Ashkhamaf	Cyrillic	Due to shifting Soviet nationality policies, scripts were converted to Cyrillic. The Adyghe alphabet followed the Kabardian one (1936) in 1938. It uses di- and trigraphs (e.g., 'къ', 'кI') and remains the basis for the modern script.
1952	K’ube Şaban	Latin	A Latin alphabet prepared in the diaspora.
1989	Official Standard	Cyrillic	Legislative consolidation of the alphabet (66 signs).: Phonetic definitions established: Гъ: Velar voiced spirant; Дж: Alveolar palatalized voiced affricate; Ӏ: Laryngeal plosive ejective
2012	R.I. Dawur (Даур Р. И)	Tamga / Symbols	Prepared "Circassian Calligraphy" (*Черкесская Каллиграфия*), attempting to create a unique alphabet by converting ancient family symbols (Tamgas) into letters.
2012	Ali İhsan Tarı	Latin	Prepared by the founder of the Adyghe Language Association in Konya.
2018	Nezhdet Meshvez	Cyrillic (Modified)	An experimental textbook replacing most digraphs/trigraphs with diacritical marks to simplify learning.

==== Arabic alphabet ====
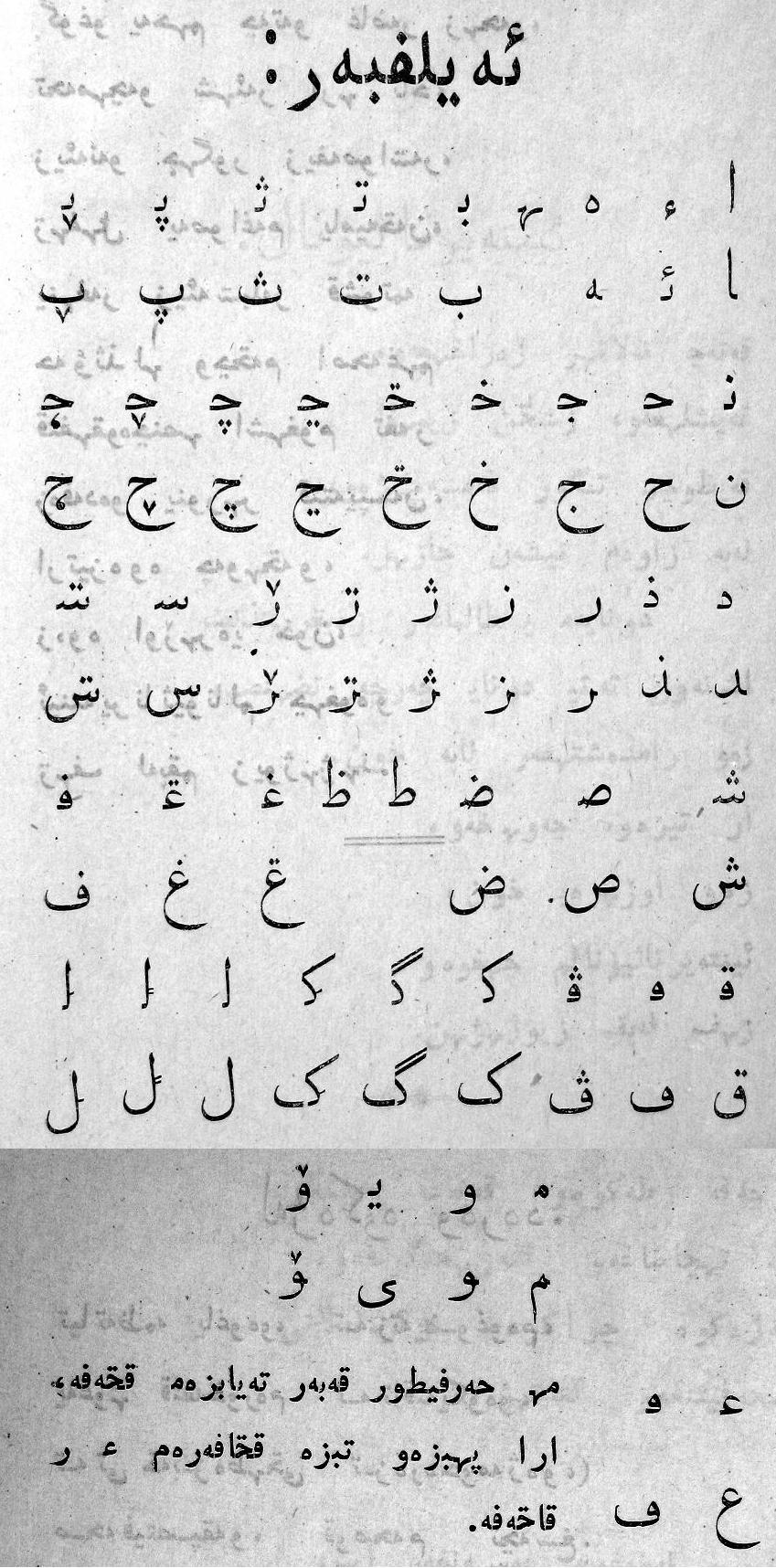
Adyghe Arabic-script alphabet (1924)

Below table shows the Adyghe Perso-Arabic alphabet as it was officially adopted between 1918 and 1927.

Forms				IPA	Adyghe Cyrillic equivalent	Adyghe Latin equivalent (1927–1938)	Unicode	Notes
Isolated	Final	Medial	Initial	IPA	Adyghe Cyrillic equivalent	Adyghe Latin equivalent (1927–1938)	Unicode	Notes
ا	ـا	ـا	آ	[aː]	А а	ᴀ	U+0622 U+0627	
ئ	ـئ	ـئـ	ئـ	[ʔ]	Ӏ ӏ	h	U+0626	1. This letter plays another role as well. It proceeds a vowel letter at the beginning of a word, with the exception of آ (equivalent to Cyrillic А а)
ؤ	ـؤ	-	-	[ʔʷ]	Ӏу ӏу	hv	U+0624	
ە	ـە	-	ئە	[a]	Э э Е е^{1}	e	U+06D5	1. The sound equivalent to Cyrillic letter "Е е" is represented by a digraph ئەیـ / ئەی / ـەی / ەی.
‍ہ‍	ـہ‍	ـہـ	ئہـ	[ə]	Ы ы	ə	U+06C1 and U+200D^{1}	1. The main character consists of U+06C1 (ـہ / ہ), and is always written in medial form. Thus, the use of Zero-width joiner (U+200D) may be necessary based on context. Below are sample scenarios: صہص; د‍ہص; صہ‍; د‍ہ‍
ب	ـب	ـبـ	بـ	[b]	Б б	ʙ	U+0628	
ت	ـت	ـتـ	تـ	[t]	Т т	t	U+062A	
ث	ـث	ـثـ	ثـ	[t͡s]	Ц ц	c	U+062B	
پ	ـپ	ـپـ	پـ	[p]	П п	ᴘ	U+067E	
ࢠ	ـࢠ	ـࢠـ	ࢠـ	[pʼ]	ПӀ пӀ		U+08A0	1. Equivalent to ٮ (U+066E) in Kabardian Arabic alphabet.
ن	ـن	ـنـ	نـ	[n]	Н н	n	U+0646	
ح	ـح	ـحـ	حـ	[ħ]	Хь хь	ɦ	U+062D	
ج	ـج	ـجـ	جـ	[d͡ʒ]	Дж дж	ǥ	U+062C	
خ	ـخ	ـخـ	خـ	[χ]	Хъ хъ		U+062E	
ݗ	ـݗ	ـݗـ	ݗـ	[x]	Х х	x	U+0757	
ڃ	ـڃ	ـڃـ	ڃـ	[kʼ][tʃʼ]	КӀ кӀ^{1}	ⱪ	U+0683	1. When the following letter is a و (Equivalent to Cyrillic КӀу кӀу), instead of the letter ڃ, the letter ࢰ is used.
چ	ـچ	ـچـ	چـ	[t͡ʃ]	Ч ч	ꝁ	U+0686	
				[t͡ʂ]	Чъ чъ	đ	^{1}	1. Letter does not exist in unicode yet. Can be created by typing the letter ح (U+062D) and the symbol combining caron below ◌̬ (U+032C), thus resulting in; ح̬ـ / ـح̬ـ / ـح̬ / ح̬
				[t͡ʃʼ]	ЧI чI		^{1}	1. Letter does not exist in unicode yet. Can be created by typing the letter ح (U+062D) and the diacritic inverted damma below ◌ࣣ (U+08E3), thus resulting in; حࣣـ / ـحࣣـ / ـحࣣ / حࣣ
د	ـد	-	-	[d]	Д д	d	U+062F	
ذ	ـذ	-	-	[d͡z]	Дз дз	ᴣ	U+0630	
ر	ـر	-	-	[r]	Р р	r	U+0631	
ز	ـز	-	-	[z]	З з	z	U+0632	
ژ	ـژ	-	-	[ʑ]	Жь жь		U+0698	
ڗ	ـڗ	-	-	[t͡sʼ]	ЦӀ цӀ		U+0697	
ڒ	ـڒ	-	-	[ʒ]	Ж ж		U+0692	
س	ـس	ـسـ	سـ	[s]	С с	s	U+0633	
				[ʃ]	Ш ш	ħ	^{1}	1. Letter does not exist in unicode yet. Can be created by typing the letter س (U+0633) and the diacritic combining diaeresis ◌̈ (U+0308), thus resulting in; س̈ـ / ـس̈ـ / ـس̈ / س̈
ش	ـش	ـشـ	شـ	[ɕ]	Щ щ	ʃ	U+0634	
ص	ـص	ـصـ	صـ	[ʂ]	Шъ шъ	š	U+0635	
ض	ـض	ـضـ	ضـ	[ʃʼ]	ШӀ шӀ		U+0636	
ط	ـط	ـطـ	طـ	[tʼ]	ТӀ тӀ		U+0637	
ظ	ـظ	ـظـ	ظـ	[ʐ]	Жъ жъ	ⱬ	U+0638	
غ	ـغ	ـغـ	غـ	[ʁ]	Гъ гъ		U+063A	
ݝ	ـݝ	ـݝـ	ݝـ	[ɣ]	Г г^{1}		U+075D	1. When the following letter is a و (Equivalent to Cyrillic Гу гу), instead of the letter ݝ, the letter گ is used.
ف	ـف	ـفـ	فـ	[f]	Ф ф	f	U+0641	
ق	ـق	ـقـ	قـ	[q]	Къ къ	q	U+0642	
ڤ	ـڤ	ـڤـ	ڤـ	[v]	В в	w	U+06A4	1. Equivalent to ۋ (U+06CB) in Kabardian Arabic alphabet.
ک	ـک	ـکـ	کـ	[k]	К к	k	U+0643	
گ	ـگ	ـگـ	گـ	[g] ([gʷ])^{1}	Г г (Гу гу)	g	U+06AF	1. When the following letter is a و (Equivalent to Cyrillic Гу гу), the letter گ is used. In all other cases, the letter ݝ is used for this specific homophone.
ࢰ	ـࢰ	ـࢰـ	ࢰـ	[kʼ] ([kʷʼ])^{1}	КӀ кӀ (КӀу кӀу)	ⱪ	U+08B0	1. When the following letter is a و (Equivalent to Cyrillic КӀу кӀу), the letter ࢰ is used. In all other cases, the letter ڃ is used for this specific homophone.
ل	ـل	ـلـ	لـ	[l]/[ɮ]	Л л	l	U+0644	
ݪ	ـݪ	ـݪـ	ݪـ	[ɬ]	Лъ лъ		U+076A	
ࢦ	ـࢦ	ـࢦـ	ࢦـ	[ɬʼ]	ЛӀ лӀ		U+08A6	
م	ـم	ـمـ	مـ	[m]	М м	m	U+0645	
و	ـو	-	ئو / و	[ɘw] [wɘ]	У у	v	U+0648	
ی	ـی	ـیـ	ئیـ / یـ	[i] / [j]	И и Й й	i / j	U+06CC	
ۆ	ـۆ	-	ئۆ	[ɜw] [wɜ]	О о	o	U+06C6	

==== Latin alphabet ====
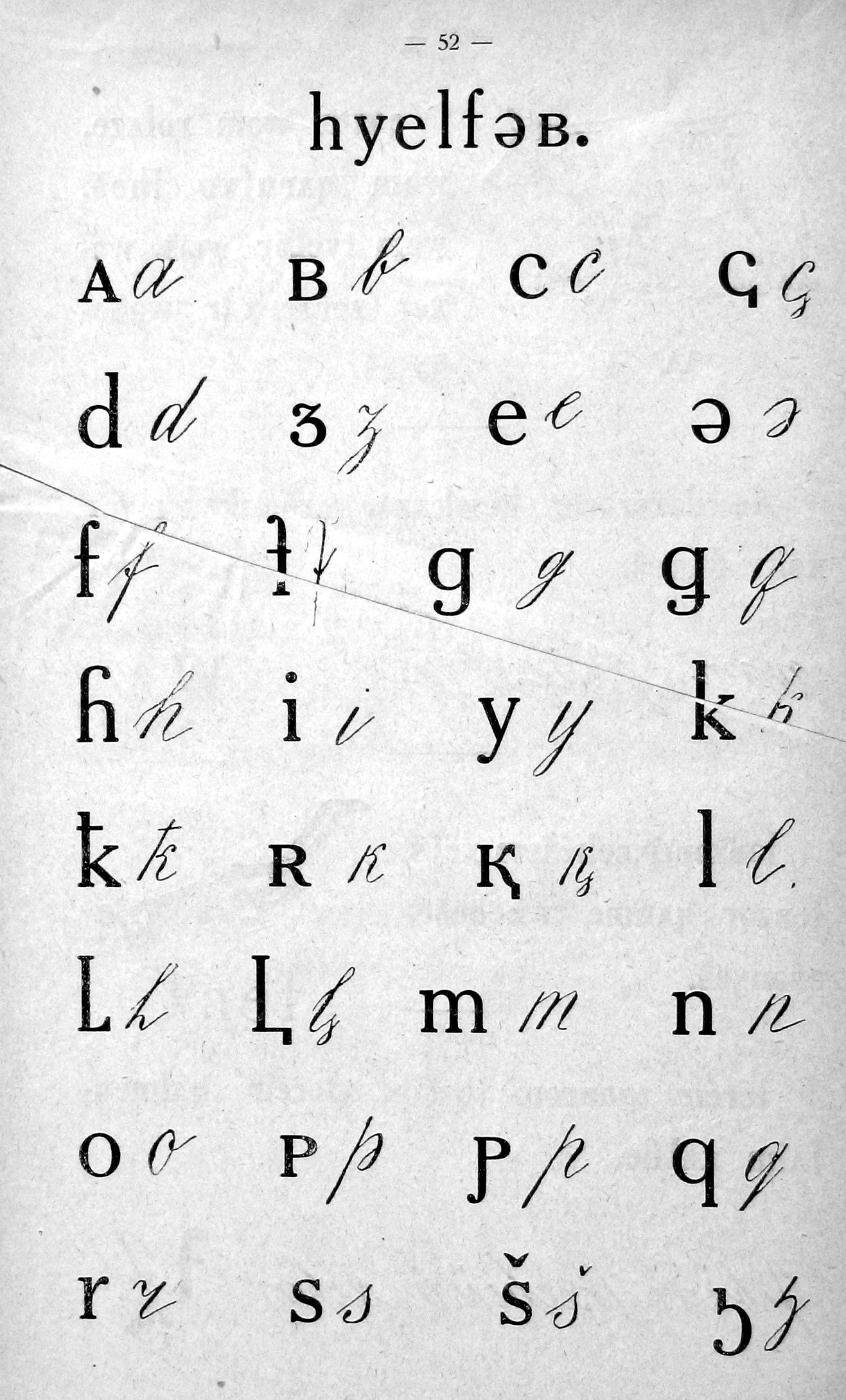
Latin Adyghe alphabet (1927, page 1)

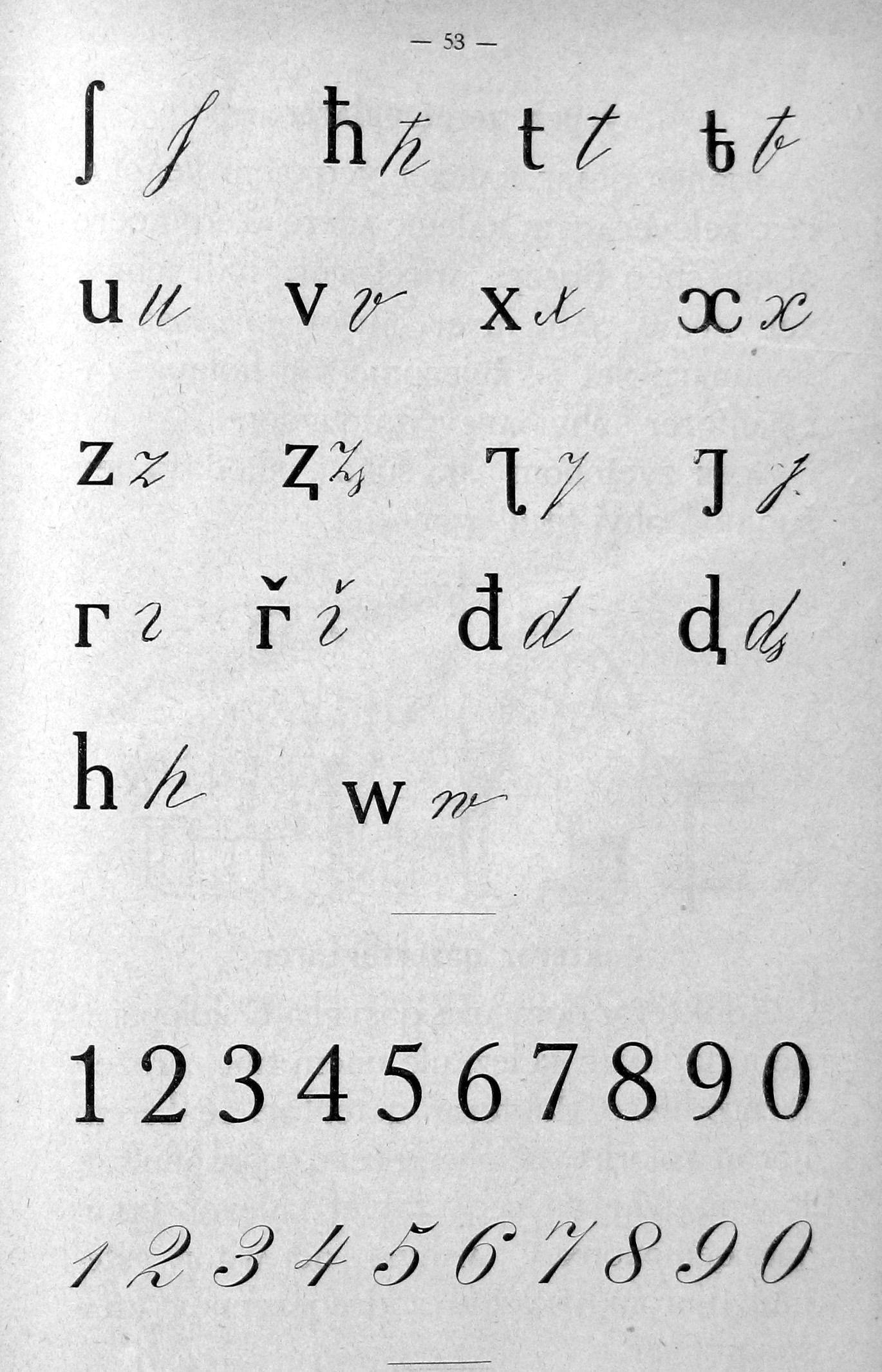
Latin Adyghe alphabet (1927, page 2)

The Adyghe orthography was officially switched to the Latin alphabet in 1927. The Adyghe Latin alphabet was compiled and finalized a year prior, in 1926. This alphabet was the sole official script in the Soviet Union. The Adyghe Latin alphabet consisted of 50 letters, many of them newly created, some even borrowed from Cyrillic. Another interesting feature of this iteration of the Adyghe Latin alphabet was that there was no distinction between lower case and upper case letters. Each letter only had one single case.

Below table shows Adyghe Latin alphabet as it was officially adopted between 1927 and 1938.

Letter	ᴀ	ʙ	c	C with descender	d	ᴣ	e	ə	f	
IPA	[aː]	[b]	[t͡s]	[t͡sʼ]	[d]	[d͡z]	[e]	[ə]	[f]	
Letter	g	ǥ	ɦ	i	y	k	ꝁ	ʀ	ⱪ	l
IPA	[ɡ]	[d͡ʒ]	[ħ]	[i]	[j]	[k]	[t͡ʃ]	[ʲ]	[kʼ]	[l]
Letter			m	n	o	ᴘ		q	r	s
IPA	[ɬ]	[ɬʼ]	[m]	[n]	[o]	[p]	[pʼ]	[q]	[r]	[s]
Letter	š	ʖ	ʃ	ħ	t	ƀ	u	v	x	
IPA	[ʂ]	[ʃʼ]	[ɕ]	[ʃ]	[t]	[tʼ]	[u]	[w]	[x]	[χ]
Letter	z	ⱬ			г	г̌	đ		h	w
IPA	[z]	[ʐ]	[ʑ]	[ʒ]	[ʁ]	[ɣ]	[t͡ʂ]	[t͡ʃʼ]	[ʔ]	[v]

==== Turkish Latin alphabet ====
In 2012, the Circassian Language Association (Adyghe: Адыге Бзэ Хасэ, ABX; Turkish: Adıge Dil Derneği) in Turkey has issued a call for the Circassian people for the creation of a standard Latin script to be used by all Circassian people on the globe. Their main motivation for the creation of this alphabet was that the majority of Circassian people live in Turkey and use the Latin alphabet in their daily life because they know Turkish. However, when trying to teach the language to the younger generation, teaching them a new alphabet takes time and makes the process more laborsome. ABX has created a Latin script based on the Turkish alphabet and chose the Abzakh dialect as their base because it is the dialect with the most speakers in Turkey. However, the alphabet employed by the Circassian Language Association has been criticized by others. Some suggested that they created the alphabet without a good understanding of the Circassian phonology and have not even considered former Latin alphabets used to write Circassian and that the use of the Latin script would sever the ties with the homeland. Despite the criticism, the CLA has obtained a €40,000 funding from the European Union for the recording of the Circassian language with a Latin script and the preparation of multi-media learning materials for the language, and the materials created by ABX were accepted by the Ministry of National Education to be taught in Secondary Schools. This decision was protested and legally objected by the Federation of Caucasian Associations (Turkish: Kafkas Dernekleri Federasyonu; KAFFED) who created the materials for Circassian and Abaza languages with the Cyrillic script; however, the court ruled in favour of the Latin alphabet created by the CLA and continued the use of their alphabet in Circassian courses. Some glyphs in the Chemguy-based Cyrillic alphabet have no equivalent in the Abzakh-based Latin alphabet because of dialectal differences. The most notable of these differences is the lack of differentiation between post-alveolar, alveolo-palatal and retroflex sounds. Though there are some additional letters in the alphabet for Kabardian, the materials in the CLA website are primarily in Adyghe.

A significant debate persists in the Turkish diaspora regarding orthography of Adyghe. This dispute intensified significantly when the Turkish Ministry of Education approved the ABX Latin Alphabet for elective Circassian language courses in public schools, effectively creating a dual-alphabet system alongside the existing Cyrillic curriculum. KAFFED vehemently opposed this decision, arguing that it creates confusion and severs cultural ties with the autonomous republics in the Caucasus. Demonstrations were at Ministry of Education offices across the country with slogans including "Hands off my alphabet," "We want our mother tongue's alphabet" and "How does Arabic in Latin letters sound?".

Latin	Aa	Bb	Cc	Ćć ^{(1)}	Çç ^{(2)}	Dd	Ee	Éé ^{(3)}	Ff
Cyrillic	А а	Б б	Дж дж	ЧI чI	Ч ч	Д д	Э э	Е е	Ф ф
IPA	[aː]	[b]	[d͡ʒ]	[t͡ʃʼ]	[t͡ʃ]	[d]	[ɜ]	[e]	[f]
Latin	Gg	Ǵǵ	Ğğ	Hh	Ḣḣ	Iı	İi ^{(3)}	Jj	Kk
Cyrillic	Г г	Г г	Гъ гъ	Хь хь	Хъ хъ	Ы ы	И и	Ж ж	Къ къ
IPA	[ɡ]	[ɣ]	[ʁ]	[ħ]	[χ]	[ə]	[i]	[ʒ]	[q]
Latin	Ḱḱ	Ll	Ĺĺ	Mm	Nn	Oo ^{(4)}	Öö ^{(4)}	Pp	Ṕṕ
Cyrillic	К к	Л л	Лъ лъ	М м	Н н	О о		П п	ПӀ пӀ
IPA	[k]	[l]	[ɬ]	[m]	[n]	[o]		[p]	[pʼ]
Latin	Qq ^{(1)}	Rr	Ss	Śś	Šš	Şş	Tt	Ṫṫ	Uu (4)
Cyrillic	КӀ кӀ	Р р	С с	Ц ц	ЦӀ цӀ	Ш ш	Т т	ТӀ тӀ	У у
IPA	[kʼ]	[r]	[s]	[t͡s]	[t͡sʼ]	[ʃ]	[t]	[tʼ]	[u]
Latin	Üü ^{(4)}	Ww	Xx	Yy	Zz	Źź	` ^{(5)}	Áá*	
Cyrillic		У у	Х х	Й й	З з	Дз дз	Ӏ ӏ		
IPA		[w]	[x]	[j]	[z]	[d͡z]	(varies)	[aː]	

1) Ć is the equivalent of both КӀ and ЧӀ and shows the ejective postalveolar affricate. Qq, on the other hand, only corresponds to КӀ and shows an ejective velar plosive.

2) Ç normally stands for Ч but when it is followed by Ü and Ö, it is equivalent to Цу in the Cyrillic script.

3) É and İ are not direct equivalents of Е and И. The Cyrillic letters denote the [jɜ] and [jə] sounds at the beginning of syllables and [e] and [i] sounds at the end. The Latin letters are only used for the sounds [e] and [i]. The diphthongs are written as "Ye" and "Yi", respectively.

4) Circassian languages do not have phonemic rounded vowels but the labialized consonants affect the vowels around them to create allophonic rounded vowels. The letters O, Ö, U and Ü are used to show these allophonic rounded vowels. O/Ö and U/Ü works similar to the vowel use О and У in the Adyghe Cyrillic alphabet with O/Ö showing labialized consonant+[ɜ] combinations and U/Ü the labialized consonant+[ə] combinations. However, Ö and Ü are used when these combinations occur next to postalveolar sounds (Ş, J, Ç). The diphthongal uses of О and У, i.e. [wɜ] and [wə], are written as "We" and "Wı". Another use of Ö and Ü is writing Turkish loanwords containing these letters.

5) Wıçüpe (уцупэ; the place of stopping) is written with a ` (accent grave) or ' (apostrophe) and has a complicated use. It is equivalent to Ӏ (palochka) in its use an ejective marker but not as the glottal stop. The glottal stop is not written as a letter but is implied through the use of consecutive vowels like in "mıerıs" (мыӀэрыс; apple). As many ejective sounds have their own letters (Ć, Ṕ, Q, Š, Ṫ), only some ejective sounds are written with the wıçüpe (ş`, ĺ`). Another use of wıçüpe is to show that an U at the end of a word represents a labialized consonant and not a labialized consonant + [ə] combination. For example, джэгу in Cyrillic is written cegu` to make sure that it is pronounced [d͡ʒɜgʷ] as a single syllable but wıçüpe is removed when the word takes a suffix and the allophonic [u] is audible, as in cegum [d͡ʒɜgum].

== Table ==
Cyrillic	Arabic	IPA	Pronunciation	Examples
А а	ا	[aː]		ачъэ, ače, 'goat' апчъы, apčy, 'they count'
Б б	ب	[b]		баджэ, badźe, 'fox' бэ, be, 'a lot'
В в (Note: Only in loanwords.)	ڤ	[v]		жъвэ, z̄ve, 'oar', лавэ, lave, 'lava'
Г г	ݝ	[ɣ]		гыны, gyny, 'powder' чъыгы, čygy, 'tree'
Гу гу	گو	[ɡʷ]		гу, gw, 'heart' гущыӀ, gwśyx̧, 'word'
Гъ гъ	غ	[ʁ]		гъатхэ, ǧatxe, 'spring' гъэмаф, ǧemaf, 'summer'
Гъу гъу	غو	[ʁʷ]		гъунэгъу, ǧwneǧw, 'neighbour' гъунджэ, ǧwndźe, 'mirror'
Д д	د	[d]		дыджы, dydźy, 'bitter' дахэ, daxe, 'pretty'
Дж дж	ج	[d͡ʒ]		джан, dźan, 'shirt' лъэмыдж, łemydź, 'bridge'
Дз дз	ذ	[d͡z]		дзыо, dzyo, 'bag' дзын, dzyn, 'to throw'
Дзу дзу	ذو	[d͡ʐʷ]		хьандзу, handzw, 'rick' хьандзуачӀ, handzwaç̌, '[lower] rick'
Е е	ئە / ەي	[ɜj] [jɜ]		ешэн, ješen, 'to catch' еплъын, jepłyn, 'to look at'
Ё ё	–	[jo]		ёлк, jolk, 'Christmas tree'
Ж ж	ڒ	[ʒ]		жэ, že, 'mouth' жакӀэ, žaḉe, 'beard'
Жъ жъ	ظ	[ʐ]		жъы, z̄y, 'old' жъажъэ, z̄az̄e, 'slow'
Жъу жъу	ظو	[ʐʷ]		жъун, z̄wn, 'to melt' жъуагъо, z̄waǧo, 'star'
Жь жь	ژ	[ʑ]		жьыбгъэ, źybǧe, 'wind' жьао, źao, 'shadow'
З з	ز	[z]		занкӀэ, zanḉe, 'straight' зандэ, zande, 'steep'
И и	ئي / ي	[ɘj] [jɘ]		ихьан, ihan, 'to enter' икӀыпӀ, iḉyṗ, 'exit'
Й й	ي	[j]		йод, jod, 'iodine' бай, baj, 'rich'
К к	ك	[k]		кнопк, knopk, 'button' команд, komand, 'team; command'
Ку ку	کو	[kʷ]		кушъэ, kws̄e, 'cradle' ку, kw, 'cart'
Къ къ	ق	[q]		къалэ, qale, 'city' къэкӀон, qeḉon, 'to come'
Къу къу	قو	[qʷ]		къухьэ, qwhe, 'ship' къушъхьэ, qws̄he, 'mountain'
КӀ кӀ	ڃ	[kʼ] [t͡ʃʼ] (Note: The grapheme «кӀ» is always pronounced [kʼ] before «о» [wɜ]. [kʼ] is considered an allophone of /t͡ʃʼ/.)		кӀымаф, ḉymaf, 'winter' кӀыхьэ, ḉyhe, 'long' кӀэ, ķe, 'tail' шкӀэ, šķe, 'calf'
КӀу кӀу	ࢰو	[kʷʼ]		кӀон, ķon, 'to walk' кӀуакӀэ, ķwaḉe, 'gait'
Л л	ل	[l] [ɮ]		лагъэ, laǧe, 'painted' лы, ly, 'meat'
Лъ лъ	ݪ	[ɬ]		лъэбэкъу, łebeqw, 'step' лъащэ, łaśe, 'lame'
ЛӀ лӀ	ࢦ	[ɬʼ]		лӀы, ļy, 'man' лӀыгъэ, ļyǧe, 'bravery'
М м	م	[m]		мазэ, maze, 'moon' мэлы, mely, 'sheep'
Н н	ن	[n]		нэ, ne, 'eye' ны, ny, 'mother'
О о	ئۆ / ۆ	[ɜw] [wɜ]		мощ, moś, 'that' коны, kony, 'bin' о, o, 'you' осы, osy, 'snow' ощхы, ośxy, 'rain'
П п	پ	[p]		пэ, pe, 'nose' сапэ, sape, 'dust'
ПӀ пӀ	ࢠ	[pʼ]		пӀэ, ṗe, 'bed' пӀэшъхьагъ, ṗes̄haǧ, 'pillow'
ПӀу пӀу	ࢠو	[pʷʼ]		пӀун, ṗwn, 'to rise; to adopt' пӀур, ṗwr, 'pupil; apprentice'
Р р	ر	[r]		рикӀэн, riḉen, 'to pour' Adyghe: риӀон rix̧on 'to tell'
С с	س	[s]		сэ, se, 'I, me' сэшхо, sešxo, 'sabre'
Т т	ت	[t]		тэтэжъ, tetez̄, 'grandfather' тэ, te, 'we, us'
ТӀ тӀ	ط	[tʼ]		тӀы, ţy, 'ram' ятӀэ, jaţe, 'dirt'
ТӀу тӀу	طو	[tʷʼ]		тӀурыс, ţwrys, 'old' тӀурытӀу, ţwryţw, 'pair'
У у	و	[ɘw] [wɘ]		ушхун, ušxwn, 'to straighten' убэн, uben, 'to tamp; to smoothen'
Ф ф	ف	[f]		фыжьы, fyźy, 'white' фэен, fejen, 'to want'
Х х	ݗ	[x]		хы, xy, 'sea; six' хасэ, xase, 'council'
Хъ хъ	خ	[χ]		хъыен, ḩyjen, 'to move' пхъэн, pḩan, 'to sow'
Хъу хъу	خو	[χʷ]		хъун, ḩwn, 'to happen' хъурай, ḩwraj, 'circle'
Хь хь	ح	[ħ]		хьэ, he, 'dog' хьаку, hakw, 'oven'
Ц ц	ث	[t͡s]		цагэ, cage, 'rib' цы, cy, 'body hair'
Цу цу	ثو	[t͡ʂʷ]		цуакъэ, cwaqe, 'shoe' цу, cw, 'ox'
ЦӀ цӀ	ڗ	[t͡sʼ]		цӀынэ, çyne, 'wet' цӀыфы, çyfy, 'person'
Ч ч	چ	[t͡ʃ]		чэфы, ćefy, 'cheerful' чэты, ćety, 'chicken'
Чъ чъ		[t͡ʂ]		чъыгай, čygaj, 'oak' чъыӀэ čyx̧e 'cold'
ЧӀ чӀ		[t͡ʂʼ]		чӀыпӀэ, ç̌yṗe, 'area' чӀыфэ, ç̌yfe, 'debt'
Ш ш		[ʃ]		шы, šy, 'brother' шыблэ, šyble, 'thunder'
Шъ шъ	ص	[ʂ]		шъэ, s̄e, 'hundred' шъабэ, s̄abe, 'soft'
Шъу шъу	صو	[ʂʷ]		шъугъуалэ, s̄wǧwale, 'envious' шъукъакӀу, s̄wqaķw, 'to come'
ШӀ шӀ	ض	[ʂʼ]		шӀын, ş̄yn, 'to do' шӀэныгъ, ş̄enyǧ, 'knowledge'
ШӀу шӀу	ضو	[ʂʷʼ]		шӀуцӀэ, ş̄wçe, 'black' шӀуфэс, ş̄wfes, 'greetings'
Щ щ	ش	[ɕ]		щагу, śagw, 'yard' щатэ, śate, 'sour cream'
(Ъ ъ)	–	–		
Ы ы	ئہـ‍ / ‍ہ‍	[ɘ]		ыкӀи, yḉi, 'and also' зы, zy, 'one'
(Ь ь)	–	[◌ʲ ]		
Э э	ئە / ە	[ɜ]		Ӏэтаж x̧etaž 'floor' нэнэжъ, nenez̄, 'grandmother'
Ю ю	یو	[ju]		Юсыф, Jusyf, 'Joseph' Юныс, Junys, 'Jonah'
Я я	یا	[jaː]		яй, jaj, 'theirs' ябгэ, jabge, 'evil'
Ӏ ӏ	ئ	[ʔ]		Ӏэ x̧e 'hand' кӀасэ, ḉase, 'like'
Ӏу ӏу	ؤ	[ʔʷ]		ӀукӀэн x̧wḉen 'to meet' Ӏусын x̧wsyn 'to be sitting near' Ӏудан x̧wdan 'thread'

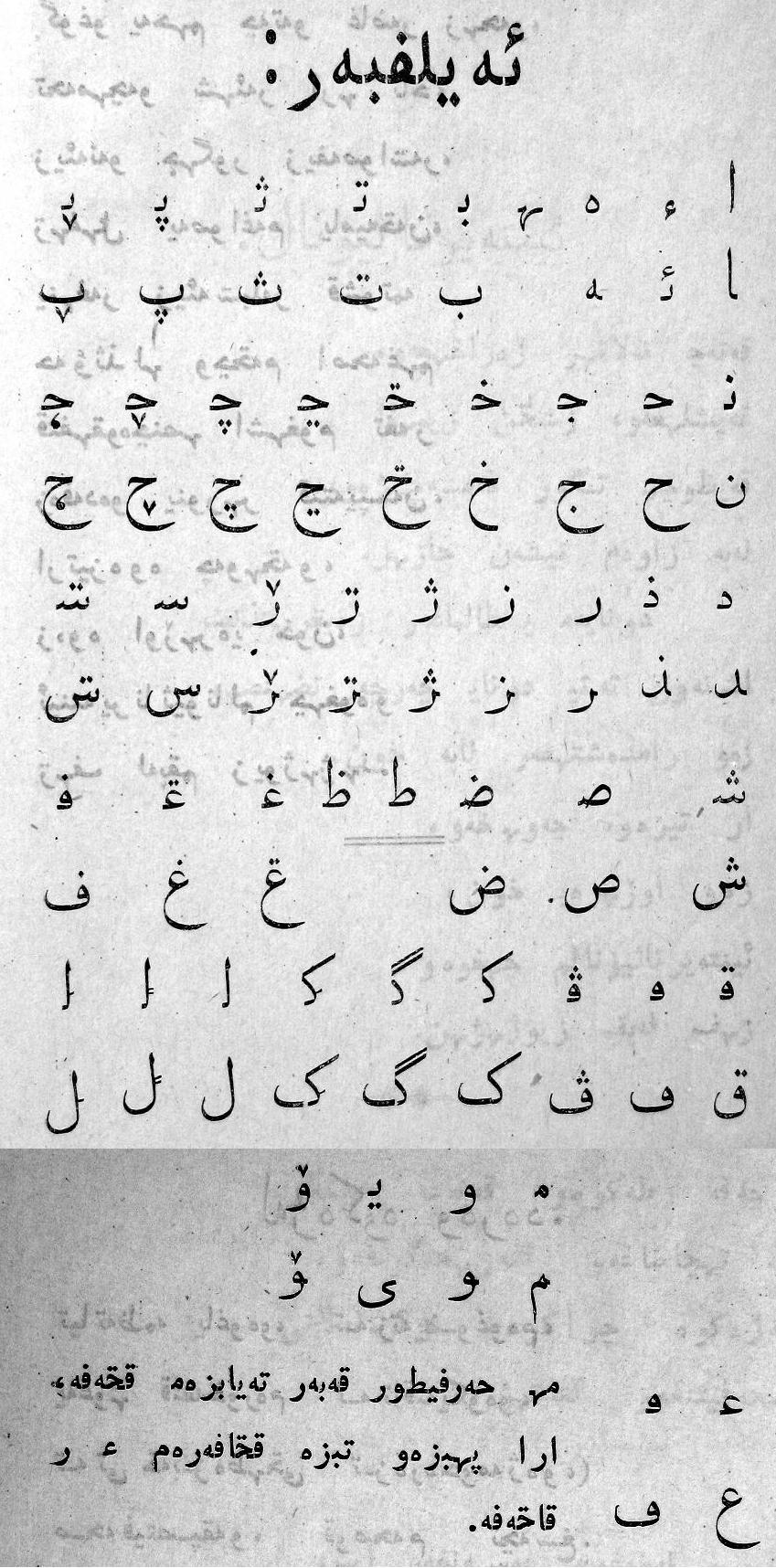
Adyghe Arabic alphabet used before 1927

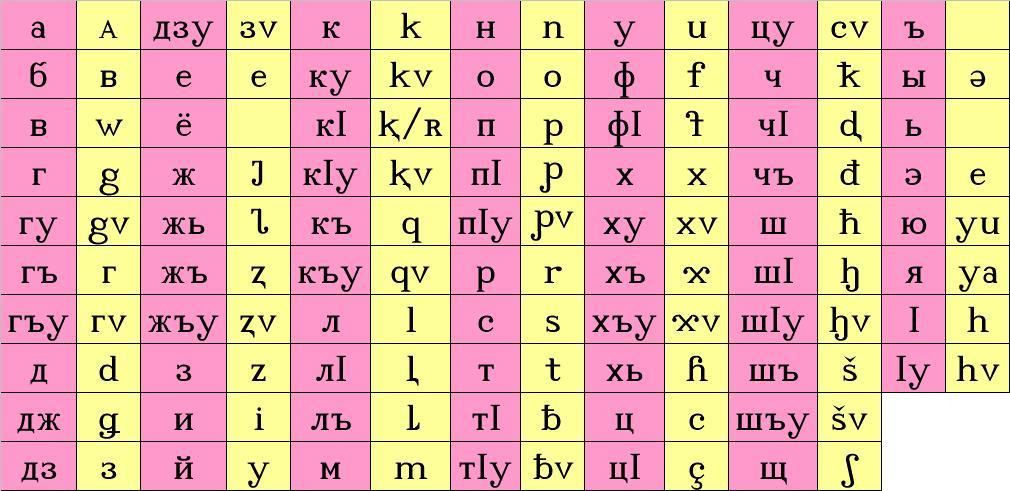
Comparison of Adyghe Latin and Adyghe Cyrillic alphabets

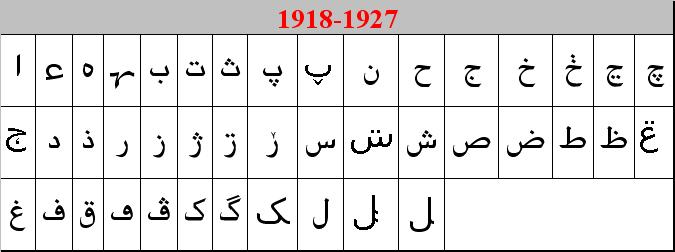
Adyghe Arabic alphabet letters

Adyghe Latin alphabet letters
