= Adyghe phonology =

System of sounds for the Adyghe language

Adyghe is a language of the Northwest Caucasian family which, like the other Northwest Caucasian languages, is very rich in consonants, featuring many labialized and ejective consonants. Adyghe is phonologically more complex than Kabardian, having the retroflex consonants and their labialized forms.

== Consonants ==
Adyghe exhibits a large number of consonants: between 50 and 60 consonants in the various Adyghe dialects. Below is the IPA phoneme chart of the consonant phonemes of Adyghe.

		Labial		Bidental	Alveolar			Post- alveolar		Alveolo- palatal		Retroflex	Velar			Uvular		Pharyngeal	Glottal		
		plain	lab.	Bidental	plain	lab.	lat.	plain	lab.	plain	lab.	Retroflex	plain	lab.	pal.	plain	lab.	Pharyngeal	plain	lab.	pal.
Nasal		m			n																
Plosive	voiceless	p			t								k (Note: Non-native consonant.)	kʷ	kʲ (Note: Found in the Shapsug and Natukhai dialects.)	q	qʷ		ʔ	ʔʷ	ʔʲ (Note: Unique to the Abzakh dialect.)
Plosive	voiced	b			d								ɡ	ɡʷ	ɡʲ						
Plosive	ejective	pʼ	pʷʼ		tʼ	tʷʼ							kʼ	kʷʼ	kʲʼ	qʼ (Note: Unique to the Hakuchi dialect.)	qʷʼ				
Affricate	voiceless				t͡s	t͡sʷ		t͡ʃ	t͡ʃʷ	t͡ɕ	t͡ɕʷ	t͡ʂ									
Affricate	voiced				d͡z	d͡zʷ		d͡ʒ		d͡ʑ	d͡ʑʷ	d͡ʐ									
Affricate	ejective				t͡sʼ			t͡ʃʼ				t͡ʂʼ									
Fricative	voiceless	f		h̪͆	s		ɬ	ʃ	ʃʷ	ɕ	ɕʷ	ʂ	x	xʷ		χ	χʷ	ħ			
Fricative	voiced	v			z		ɮ	ʒ	ʒʷ	ʑ	ʑʷ	ʐ	ɣ			ʁ	ʁʷ				
Fricative	ejective				sʼ		ɬʼ	ʃʼ	ʃʷʼ	ɕʼ	ɕʷʼ										
Approximant										j				w							
Trill					r																

- In the Black Sea coast dialects of Adyghe (e.g. Shapsug and Natukhai) there exist a palatalized voiced velar stop [ɡʲ], a palatalized voiceless velar stop [kʲ] and a palatalized velar ejective [kʲʼ] that were merged with [d͡ʒ], [t͡ʃ] and [t͡ʃʼ] in most Adyghe dialects. For example, the Shapsug words "гьанэ" [ɡʲaːnɐ] "shirt", "кьэт" [kʲɐt] "chicken" and "кӀьапсэ" [kʲʼaːpsɐ] "rope" are pronounced in other dialects as "джанэ" [d͡ʒaːnɐ], "чэт" [t͡ʃɐt] and "кӀапсэ" [t͡ʃʼaːpsɐ].
- The labialized retroflex consonants шъу [ʂʷ] and жъу [ʐʷ] in the literary Temirgoy dialect are alveolo-palatal щу [ɕʷ] and жьу [ʑʷ] in the Black Sea coast dialects of Adyghe (Shapsug and Natukhai).
- In the Black Sea coast dialects of Adyghe (e.g. Shapsug and Natukhai) there exist an alveolar ejective fricative [sʼ] that correspond to [t͡sʼ] in other Adyghe dialects. For example, the Shapsug words "сӀэ" [sʼa] "name" and "псӀы" [psʼə] "lie" are pronounced in other dialects as "цӀэ" [t͡sʼɐ] and "пцӀы" [pt͡sʼə].
- The phoneme written Л л is pronounced as a voiced alveolar lateral fricative [ɮ] mostly by the Circassians of Adygea, but many Circassians in diaspora pronounce it as an alveolar lateral approximant [l].
- In Adyghe, the palato-alveolar consonants ш [ʃ], шӀ [ʃʼ] and шӀу [ʃʷʼ] may be affricated to ч [t͡ʃ], чӀ [ʈ͡ʂʼ] and чӀу [ʈ͡ʂʷʼ] after the consonant с [s] or шъу [ʃʷ]. For example, the words:

сщагъ "I carried him to" → счагъ [sət͡ʃaːʁ]
сшӀагъ "I knew": → счӀагъ [sət͡ʂʼaːʁ]
сшӀэрэп "I don't know": → счӀэрэп [sət͡ʂʼɐrɐp]
сшӀошӀыгъ "I thought" → счӀошӀыгъ [sət͡ʂʷʼɐʃʼəʁ]
шъушӀагъ "you (pl.) knew" → шъучӀагъ [ʃʷt͡ʂʼaːʁ].

- The first and second person prefixes с [s], т [t], п [p] and шъу [ʃʷ] may become voiced з [z], д [d], б [b] and жъу [ʒʷ] before the consonant гъ [ʁ]. For example:

сгъэкӀуагъ "I made him go" → згъэкӀуагъ [zʁɐkʷʼaːʁ]
тгъэкӀуагъ "we made him go" → дгъэкӀуагъ [dʁɐkʷʼaːʁ]
пгъэкӀуагъ "you made him go" → бгъэкӀуагъ [bʁɐkʷʼaːʁ]
шъугъэкӀуагъ "you (pl.) made him go" → жъугъэкӀуагъ [ʒʷʁɐkʷʼaːʁ].

- The phoneme [f] ⟨ф⟩ found in the Adyghe dialects correspond to [xʷ] ⟨ху⟩ in Kabardian. For example:

тфы [tfə] "five" ↔ тху [txʷə]
фыжьы [fəʑə] "white" ↔ хужь [xʷəʑ]
цӀыфы [t͡sʼəfə] "person" ↔ цӀыху [t͡sʼəxʷ].

- In many Adyghe dialects (e.g. Bzhedug, Shapsug, Natukhia and Abzakh) there exist [t͡ɕʷ] ⟨чъу⟩ that corresponds to standard Temirgoy [t͡sʷ] ⟨цу⟩. For example, the Temirgoy word цуакъэ [t͡sʷaːqɐ] is чъуакъэ [t͡ɕʷaːqɐ] in the other Adyghe dialects.
- All dialects possess a contrast between plain and labialized glottal stops. A very unusual minimal contrast in the Abzakh dialect is a three-way contrast between plain, labialized and palatalized glottal stops.
- The Black Sea dialect of Adyghe contains a very uncommon sound: a bidental fricative [h̪͆], which corresponds to the voiceless velar fricative [x] found in other varieties of Adyghe.
- The Hakuchi dialect of Adyghe contains uvular ejective [qʼ] and a labialized uvular ejective [qʷʼ], which corresponds to the [ʔ] and [ʔʷ] in other dialects.

== Vowels ==
In contrast to its large consonant inventory, Adyghe has only three phonemic vowels in a classic vertical vowel system. /ə/ and /ɐ/ have varying allophones, whereas /aː/ has a more limited set. Realization of vocalic allophones is based on the surrounding consonants.

	Central
Mid	ə
Near-open	ɐ
Open	aː

- Lax vowels /ə, ɐ/ are usually rounded to [ɵ, ɞ] between labialized consonants within the same syllable; fronted to [ɪ, ɛ] in the environment of coronal and palatalized consonants; and retracted to [ɤ, ʌ] in the environment of uvular, pharyngeal and glottal consonants.^{:16}
- When /ə, ɐ/ are surrounded by a plain and a posterior consonant, they are backed only in the CVC environment.^{:22}

== Stress ==
Stress in Adyghe is phonemic, in that it is unpredictable. The lexical stress tends to fall on one of two last syllables of the word stem. Longer words can also have multiple stress patterns, as in below:

Orthography / Transliteration: чэлэцъикор / čʼălăcikor
Stress 1:    чэлэцъикор / čʼălăcikor
Stress 2:    чэлэцъикор / čʼălăcikor
Stress 3:    чэлэцъикор / čʼălăcikor
Stress 4:    чэлэцъикор / čʼălăcikor
Stress 5:    чэлэцъикор / čʼălăcikor
Blue: Primary stress
Green: Secondary stress

However, the functional load of stress is extremely low, but yet there are pairs that differ optionally.
