= Tlingit alphabet =

Transcriptions of Tlingit

The Tlingit language has been recorded in a number of orthographies over the two hundred years since European contact. The first transcriptions of Tlingit were done by Russian Orthodox ministers in the Cyrillic script. A hiatus in writing Tlingit occurred subsequent to the purchase of Alaska by the United States due to the policies implemented by Presbyterian reverend and territorial educational commissioner Sheldon Jackson, who believed that the use of indigenous languages should be suppressed in favor of English. American and German anthropologists began recording Tlingit in various linguistic transcriptions from the 1890s onward, and there exists a small body of literature and a large amount of vocabulary recorded in these transcriptions. With the work of two linguists from the Summer Institute of Linguistics, Gillian Story and Constance Naish, the first "complete" orthography for Tlingit began to spread in the 1960s. This orthography, now somewhat modified, is the most common orthography in use today. In the 1980s Jeff Leer and the Yukon Native Language Center developed another orthography for writing Interior Tlingit. Since the spread of email among the Tlingit population a new orthography has developed by consensus, based on the Naish-Story orthography but adapted to the restrictions of plain text encodings such as ISO 8859-1.

== Cyrillic alphabets ==
Tlingit was first written with the Cyrillic script during Russian rule over Alaska. An 1846 orthography uses the following letters: а г е и к ԟ л н с т у х ц ч ш ю я.

An example of the Cyrillic Tlingit alphabet can be found in the text Indication of the Pathway into the Kingdom of Heaven (Russian: Указаніе пути въ Царствіе Небесное, Tlingit-Cyrillic Ка-вак-шіи ев-у-ту-ци-ни-и дте Тики Ан-ка-у хан-те), written by the priest John Veniaminov in 1901. This orthography does not have a one-to-one correspondence with Tlingit phonemes nor does it record tone, but a Tlingit speaker familiar with the Cyrillic script can puzzle out the proper pronunciations without too much difficulty.

Given the extension of the Cyrillic script to deal with the phonemic systems found in Central Asian and Siberian languages, it is easy to construct a modern Cyrillic alphabet to fully represent Tlingit. This has been done at least once, but the population familiar with both the Cyrillic script and the Tlingit language is rather small, thus no such script is likely to find serious use.

== Linguistic transcriptions ==
With the flowering of American anthropology and the focus on the Northwest Coast came a number of linguistic transcriptions of Tlingit. Most were constructed in the Boasian tradition, one used by Boas himself in his rudimentary Tlingit grammar published in 1917. The other most widespread transcriptions were the one used extensively by John Swanton in his Tlingit Myths and Texts and The Tlingit Language, and the one used by Frederica de Laguna in her Story of a Tlingit Village and Under Mount Saint Elias.

The recent publication of George T. Emmons's The Tlingit Indians was heavily edited by De Laguna and subsequently uses her transcription system. Emmons himself did not use any regular transcription when writing Tlingit words and phrases, despite requests from anthropologists of the day. His idiosyncratic and inconsistent recordings of Tlingit were mostly translated by De Laguna into her transcription, but a number of words and phrases he wrote down continue to puzzle linguists and Tlingit speakers alike.

== Naish–Story orthography ==
Constance Naish and Gillian Story developed their orthography for use in their Bible translations and related works. Because this was the first system that could accurately represent all the Tlingit phonemes, and due to the pair's emphasis on native literacy, the Naish–Story system became very widespread within a few years of its introduction.

=== Modified Naish–Story orthography ===
Naish and Story modified their system for the publication of their Tlingit Verb Dictionary (1973).

== American revised popular orthography ==
The American orthography, so called because of its use in Southeast Alaska in contrast to the system used in Canada, is the current incarnation of the Naish-Story system, which underwent some sporadic modification during the two decades following its introduction. It continues to represent the uvular consonants with the underscore diacritic, but drops the grave accent in favor of unmarked low tone. (The grave accent can still be used to discriminate tonal emphasis as well as the additional tones of Southern Tlingit.) It retains the single graphs for short vowels and English-based digraphs for long vowels.

The current "official" Tlingit alphabet used in Alaska:

Majuscule forms (also called uppercase or capital letters)
A	Á	Aa	Áa	Ch	Chʼ	D	Dl	Dz	E	É	Ee	Ée	Ei	Éi	G	Gw	G̱	G̱w	H	I	Í	J	K	Kw	Kʼ	Kʼw	Ḵ	Ḵw	Ḵʼ	Ḵʼw	L	Lʼ	N	Oo	Óo	S	Sʼ	Sh	T	Tʼ	Tl	Tlʼ	Ts	Tsʼ	U	Ú	W	X	Xw	Xʼ	Xʼw	X̱	X̱w	X̱ʼ	X̱ʼw	Y	․
Minuscule forms (also called lowercase or small letters)
a	á	aa	áa	ch	chʼ	d	dl	dz	e	é	ee	ée	ei	éi	g	gw	g̱	g̱w	h	i	í	j	k	kw	kʼ	kʼw	ḵ	ḵw	ḵʼ	ḵʼw	l	lʼ	n	oo	óo	s	sʼ	sh	t	tʼ	tl	tlʼ	ts	tsʼ	u	ú	w	x	xw	xʼ	xʼw	x̱	x̱w	x̱ʼ	x̱ʼw	y	․
Broad IPA value
/ʌ/	/ʌ́/	/aː/	/áː/	/tʃʰ/	/tʃʼ/	/t/ /d/	/tɬ/ /dl/	/ts/ /dz/	/ɛ/	/ɛ́/	/iː/	/íː/	/eː/	/éː/	/k/ /ɡ/	/kʷ/ /ɡʷ/	/q/ /ɢ/	/qʷ/ /ɢʷ/	/h/	/ɪ/	/ɪ́/	/tʃ/ /dʒ/	/kʰ/	/kʷʰ/	/kʼ/	/kʷʼ/	/qʰ/	/qʷʰ/	/qʼ/	/qʷʼ/	/ɬ/	/ɬʼ/	/n/	/uː/	/úː/	/s/	/sʼ/	/ʃ/	/tʰ/	/tʼ/	/tɬʰ/	/tɬʼ/	/tsʰ/	/tsʼ/	/ʊ/	/ʊ́/	/w/	/x/	/xʷ/	/xʼ/	/xʷʼ/	/χ/	/χʷ/	/χʼ/	/χʷʼ/	/j/	/ʔ/

== Canadian orthography ==
The Canadian orthography was developed at the Yukon Native Language Center in the 1980s. It features intentional similarities to the orthographies used in Athabaskan languages of the Yukon Territory and British Columbia.

== Email orthography ==
The email orthography developed informally with the increasing use of email in the 1990s. It is essentially an adaptation of the American system to the limitations of plain text encodings such as ISO-8859-1 and Windows-1252. Since the acute accent is readily available on most computers due to its use in a number of widespread European languages, it continues to be used to mark high tone in the email orthography. However, since there is no underscore diacritic available, the e-mail orthography represents the uvular consonants with a digraph of the velar consonant plus h in the same manner as in the Canadian orthography. This system is relatively easy to input on a computer using an extended US keyboard with support for the acute accent. It has begun to see use in Tlingit writing for signs, regalia, posters, and newsletters, despite its unofficial status. Since it requires no extraneous formatting hacks, this orthography is the one used in all Wikipedia articles containing Tlingit text.

== Comparison table ==
The table below gives side-by-side comparisons of the three major orthographies (e-mail, American, and Canadian) along with their IPA equivalents. Note that certain unaspirated consonants are pronounced as voiced by some younger and second-language speakers, the IPA equivalents for these voiced consonants are given in parentheses. In addition, there are a few phonemes which are geographically or historically restricted in modern Tlingit. For example, Canadian speakers often make use of m where most other speakers would have w. The character usually given as ÿ has died out within the last generation of speakers, becoming one of y or w depending on position. The three major orthographies optionally allow for the representation of all of these phonemes in Tlingit writing.

e-mail	Am.	Can.	IPA
a	a		[ʌ]
á	á		[ʌ́]
aa	aa	à	[aː]
áa	áa	â	[áː]
ch	ch		[tʃʰ]
ch'	chʼ		[tʃʼ]
d	d		[t], [d]
dl	dl	dł	[tɬ], [dl]
dz	dz		[ts], [dz]
e	e		[ɛ]
é	é		[ɛ́]
ee	ee	ì	[iː]
ée	ée	î	[íː]
ei	ei	è	[eː]
éi	éi	ê	[éː]
g	g		[k], [ɡ]
gw	gw		[kʷ], [ɡʷ]
gh	g̱	gh	[q], [ɢ]
ghw	g̱w	ghw	[qʷ], [ɢʷ]
h	h		[h]
i	i		[ɪ]
í	í		[ɪ́]
j	j		[tʃ], [dʒ]
k	k		[kʰ]
kw	kw		[kʷʰ]
k'	kʼ		[kʼ]
k'w	kʼw		[kʷʼ]
kh	ḵ	kh	[qʰ]
khw	ḵw	khw	[qʷʰ]
kh'	ḵʼ	khʼ	[qʼ]
kh'w	ḵʼw	khʼw	[qʷʼ]
l	l	ł	[ɬ]
l'	lʼ	łʼ	[ɬʼ]
(ll)	(ḻ)	l	[l]
(m)	(m)		[m]
n	n		[n]
(o)	(o)		[o]
oo	oo	ù	[uː]
óo	óo	û	[úː]
s	s		[s]
s'	sʼ		[sʼ]
sh	sh		[ʃ]
t	t		[tʰ]
t'	tʼ		[tʼ]
tl	tl		[tɬʰ]
tl'	tlʼ		[tɬʼ]
ts	ts		[tsʰ]
ts'	tsʼ		[tsʼ]
u	u		[ʊ]
ú	ú		[ʊ́]
w	w		[w]
x	x		[x]
xw	xw		[xʷ]
x'	xʼ		[xʼ]
x'w	xʼw		[xʷʼ]
xh	x̱	xh	[χ]
xhw	x̱w	xhw	[χʷ]
xh'	x̱ʼ	xhʼ	[χʼ]
xh'w	x̱ʼw	xhʼw	[χʷʼ]
y	y		[j]
(ÿ)	(ÿ/y̱)	(ÿ)	[ɰ]
.	․		[ʔ]
