= Belarusian phonology =

Phonology of the Belarusian language

The phonological system of the modern Belarusian language consists of at least 44 phonemes: 5 vowels and 39 consonants. Consonants may also be geminated. There is no absolute agreement on the number of phonemes; rarer or contextually variant sounds are included by some scholars.

Many consonants may form pairs that differ only in palatalization (called hard and soft consonants, the latter being represented in the IPA with the symbol ⟨ʲ⟩). In some of such pairs, the place of articulation is additionally changed (see distinctive features below). Some consonants do not have palatalized counterparts.

== Distinctive features ==
As an East Slavic language, Belarusian phonology is very similar to both Russian and Ukrainian phonology. The primary differences are:

- Akannye (Belarusian: аканне) – the merger of unstressed /o/ into /a/. The pronunciation of the merged vowel is a clear open front unrounded vowel [a], including after soft consonants and /j/. In standard Russian akanye, the merger happens only after hard consonants; after soft consonants, /o/ merges with /i/ instead. Ukrainian does not have this merger at all. In Belarusian, unlike Russian, this change is reflected in spelling: compare галава́ "head", pronounced [ɣalaˈva], with Russian голова́ [ɡəlɐˈva] and Ukrainian голова́ [ɦɔlɔˈwɑ].
- Lack of ikanye (the Russian sound change in which unstressed /e/ has merged with /i/, and unstressed /a/ and /o/ with /i/ after soft consonants). Instead, unstressed /e/ merges with /a/ (yakannye). Compare Belarusian зямля́ [zʲamˈlʲa] with Russian земля́ [zʲɪˈmlʲa] and Ukrainian [zeˈmlʲɑ].
  Not all instances of */e/ are subject to yakannye in literary Belarusian, for example па́лец [ˈpalʲɛts] instead of па́ляц [ˈpalʲats], which occurs only dialectally. In standard Belarusian, yakannye after palatalized consonants occurs in the syllable immediately preceding the tonic syllable: пе́сня [ˈpʲɛsʲnʲa] "song" — пясня́р [pʲasʲˈnʲar] "singer" — песняры́ [pʲɛsʲnʲaˈrɨ] "singers". Exceptions are allowed in loanwords: меда́ль [mʲɛˈdalʲ] "medal".
- Tsyekannye (Belarusian: цеканне) and dzyekannye (Belarusian: дзеканне) – the pronunciation of underlying /*tʲ, *dʲ/ as soft affricates [tsʲ, dzʲ]. This occurs, for instances, in:
  - Belarusian дзя́цел "woodpecker" [ˈd͡zʲat͡sʲeɫ]; compare Russian дя́тел [ˈdʲætʲɪɫ] and Ukrainian дя́тел [ˈdʲateɫ].
  - Belarusian ця́га "draught" [ˈt͡sʲaɣa]; compare Russian тя́га [ˈtʲaɡə] and Ukrainian тяг [tʲaɦ] ~ тя́га [ˈtʲaɦɐ].
  - Many Russian speakers similarly affricate phonemic /tʲ, dʲ/, but this is not universal and not written.
- Belarusian distinguishes the soft sound [tsʲ] which comes from tsyekannye of underlying /*tʲ/ and the hard sound [ts] which comes from Common Slavonic *c (which is thought to be [tsʲ] in Old East Slavic, but hardened to [ts] in all positions in Russian and Belarusian and before /e/ in Ukrainian); for example: CSl. *ovьca yielded Belarusian аўца́ "sheep (dated)" [au̯ˈt͡sa] and Russian овца [ɐfˈt͡sa] but Ukrainian вівця́ [ʋʲiu̯ˈt͡sʲa]). Both the soft and hard sounds can be seen in the Belarusian word for "father (dated)" аце́ц [at͡sʲet͡s] from CSl. *otьcь, whence also Russian отец [ɐˈtʲet͡s] but Ukrainian отець [ɔˈtɛt͡sʲ].
- Relatively stronger palatalization of /sʲ/ and /zʲ/.
- Postalveolar consonants in Belarusian (/ʐ, ʂ, tʂ, dʐ/) are all hard (laminal retroflex), whereas Russian has both either both hard (/ʐ, ʂ/) or soft postalveolars (/tɕ, ɕː/, as well as /ʑː/ for some speakers). Compare:
  - Belarusian жы́та "rye" [ˈʐɨta] and Russian жи́то "grain; rye (dated or regional)" [ˈʐɨtə]; Belarusian гараджа́нін "townsman" [ɣaraˈd͡ʐanʲin] and Russian горожа́нин [ɡərɐˈʐanʲɪn]; Belarusian шып "thorn" [ʂɨp] and Russian шип [ʂɨp]; Belarusian чын "rank" [t͡ʂɨn] and Russian чин [t͡ɕin]; Belarusian "shield" шчыт [ʂt͡ʂɨt] and Russian щит [ɕːit], Belarusian "yeast" дро́жджы [ˈdroʐd͡ʐɨ] vs. Russian дро́жжи [ˈdroʑːɪ] ~ [ˈdroʐːɨ], etc.
- The phoneme /rʲ/ has hardened and merged with /r/; compare:
  - Belarusian рэ́дзька [ˈrɛt͡sʲka] "radish" and Russian ре́дька [ˈrʲetʲkə], Belarusian рад [rat] "row, line" and Russian ряд [rʲat], Belarusian вастрыё "tip" [vastrɨˈjo] and Russian остриё [ɐstrʲɪˈjɵ], Belarusian бяро́за "birch" [bʲaˈroza] and Russian берёза [bʲɪˈrʲɵzə], Belarusian цар [t͡sar] "tsar (nominative, singular)" and Russian царь [t͡sarʲ], Belarusian цару́ [t͡saˈru] "tsar (dative, singular)" and Russian царю́ [t͡sɐˈrʲu], etc.
- The soft labials /pʲ, bʲ, vʲ, fʲ, mʲ/ have hardened in word-final position (as in Ukrainian); compare Belarusian сем [ˈsʲɛm] and Ukrainian сім [ˈsʲim] "seven" with Russian семь [ˈsʲemʲ].
- Unlike in standard Russian but like in Ukrainian, historical /l/ before consonants has merged with /v/ and is pronounced [w]. This is reflected in the spelling, which uses a special symbol known as "non-syllabic u" (Belarusian: у нескладовae), written as an ⟨u⟩ with a breve diacritic on top of it: ⟨ў⟩,^{?} ⟨ŭ⟩,^{?} whereas Ukrainian uses the letter ⟨в⟩. For example: Belarusian воўк [vowk] — Russian волк [voɫk] — Ukrainian вовк [ʋowk] "wolf". The merger did not occur before suffixes (before historical ⟨ъ⟩ in the word middle): Belarusian палка [ˈpaɫka] — Russian палка [ˈpaɫkə] — Ukrainian палка [ˈpaɫkɐ] "stick". The word-final /l/ also became [w] in the past tense of verbs: Belarusian даў [daw] — Russian дал [daɫ] — Ukrainian дав [daw] "gave".
- Lenition of /ɡ/ to /ɣ/ similarly to Ukrainian, Czech, Slovak, or southern Russian dialects, and unlike standard Russian and Polish.
- Late Old East Slavic /e/ (inherited from Proto-Slavic /*e/ or front yer *ь (/*ĭ/)) shifted to Belarusian and Russian /ʲo/ when stressed and not before a soft consonant (i.e. at word-final position or before a hard consonant). Compare:
  - Belarusian кап'ё "spear" [kaˈpjo] from *kopьje, whence also Russian копьё [kɐˈpʲjɵ].
  - Belarusian зялёны "green" [zʲaˈlʲɔnɨ] from *zelenъ, whence also Russian зелёный [zʲɪˈlʲɵnɨj] but Ukrainian зеле́ний [zeˈɫɛnɪi̯].
  - Belarusian пёс "dog" [pʲos] from *pьsъ, whence also Russian пёс [pʲɵs] but Ukrainian пес [pes].
- Aforesaid Belarusian and Russian /ʲo/, and /ʲo/ from epenthetic /e/ as well, can further shift to /o/ after a hardened soft consonant. For example:
  - Belarusian аро́л "eagle" [aˈroɫ] from *orьlъ, whence also Russian орёл [ɐˈrʲɵɫ] but Ukrainian оре́л [ɔˈrɛɫ].
  - Belarusian яйцо́ "egg" [jajˈt͡so] from *ajьce, whence also Russian яйцо́ [jɪjˈt͡so] but Ukrainian яйце́ [jɐi̯ˈt͡sɛ];
  - Belarusian бяро́за "birch" [bʲaˈroza] from *berza, whence also Russian берёза [bʲɪˈrʲɵzə], but Ukrainian береза [beˈrɛzɐ].

Unlike in Russian but like in Ukrainian, Belarusian spelling closely represents surface phonology rather than the underlying morphophonology. For example, akannye, tsyekannye, dzyekannye and the [w] allophone of /v/ and /l/ are all written. The representation of akannye in particular introduces striking differences between Russian and Belarusian orthography.

== Vowels ==
	Front	Central	Back
Close	i	ɨ	u
Mid	ɛ		ɔ
Open		a	

Belarusian Cyrillic script	Belarusian Latin script	IPA	Description	Belarusian example
і	i	/i/	close front unrounded	лiст ('leaf')
э	e	/ɛ/	mid-central (unstressed), open-mid front unrounded (stressed)	гэты ('this one')
е	ie, je	[ʲe̞]	Palatalises preceding consonant followed by mid front unrounded vowel	белы ('white')
ы	y	[ɨ]	close central unrounded	мыш ('mouse')
а, я	a	/a/	open central unrounded	кат ('executioner')
у, ю	u	/u/	close back rounded	шум ('noise')
о, ё	o	/o/ [ɔ]	open-mid back rounded	кот ('cat')

As with Russian, [ɨ] is not a separate phoneme, but an allophone of /i/ occurring after non-palatalized consonants.

== Consonants ==
The consonants of Belarusian are as follows:

		Labial		Alveolar/Dental		Retroflex	Dorsal	
		plain	pal.	plain	pal.	Retroflex	plain	pal.
Nasal		m	mʲ	n̪	n̪ʲ			
Stop	voiceless	p	pʲ	t̪			k	kʲ
Stop	voiced	b	bʲ	d̪			(ɡ)	(ɡʲ)
Affricate	voiceless			ts̪	ts̪ʲ	ʈʂ		
Affricate	voiced			dz̪	dz̪ʲ	ɖʐ		
Fricative	voiceless	f	fʲ	s	sʲ	ʂ	x	xʲ
Fricative	voiced	v	vʲ	z	zʲ	ʐ	ɣ	ɣʲ
Approximant		w		l̪	l̪ʲ		j	
Trill				r				

The rare phonemes /ɡ/ and /ɡʲ/ are present only in several borrowed words: ганак [ˈɡanak], гузік [ˈɡuzik], and in some native words containing the combinations /zɡ⁽ʲ⁾/, /dzɡ/, /dʐɡ/: мазгі [mazˈɡʲi], джгаць [d͡ʐɡat͡sʲ]. Other borrowed words have the fricative pronunciation: геаграфія [ɣʲeaˈɣrafʲija] ('geography'). In addition, [ɡ] and [ɡʲ] are allophones of /k/ and /kʲ/ respectively, when voiced by regressive assimilation, as in вакзал [vaɡˈzal] 'train station'.

In the syllable coda, /v/ is pronounced [w] or [u̯], forming diphthongs, and is spelled ⟨ў⟩. [w] sometimes derives etymologically from /l/, as with воўк [vɔwk] ('wolf'), which comes from Proto-Slavic *vьlkъ. Similar to Ukrainian, there are also alternations between [w] and /l/ in the past tense of verbs: for example, ду́маў /ˈdumaw/ "(he) thought" versus ду́мала /ˈdumala/ "(she) thought". This evolved historically from a form with /l/ (as in Russian: ду́мал) which vocalized like the Ł in Polish (cognate dumał, "he mused").

The geminated variations are transcribed as follows:

- падарожжа [padaˈroʐːa]
- ззяць [zʲːat͡sʲ]
- стагоддзе [staˈɣod͡zʲːe]
- каханне [kaˈxanʲːe]
- калоссе [kaˈlosʲːe]
- ліхалецце [lʲixaˈlʲet͡sʲːe]
- сярэднявечча [sʲarɛdnʲaˈvʲet͡ʂːa].

Those sounds arose from assimilation of consonant+/j/ combinations.

== Bibliography ==
- Mayo, Peter (2002), "Belorussian", in Comrie, Bernard; Corbett, G. G. (eds.), The Slavonic Languages, London: Routledge, pp. 887–946, ISBN 0-415-28078-8
- Padluzhny, Ped (1989), Fanetyka belaruskai litaraturnai movy, Навука і тэхніка, p. 335, ISBN 5-343-00292-7
- Sussex, Roland; Cubberly, Paul (2006), The Slavic Languages, Cambridge: Cambridge University Press, ISBN 0-521-22315-6
- Blinava (Блінава); Haŭroš; Kavaliova (1991), Bielaruskaja mova (Беларуская мова: Практычны дапаможнiк для абiтурыентаў), Minsk: Vyšejšaja škola (Вышэйшая школа), ISBN 5-339-00539-9
