= Daud Ashkhamaf =

Circassian linguist, folklorist, and educator

- Ӏашъхьэмаф Алийыкъо Даут
- Born: 1897; Khakurinokhabl, Kuban Oblast
- Died: 23 July 1946 (aged 48–49); Maykop, Adygea
- Citizenship: USSR
- Education: Institute of the East
- Known for: Adyghe language alphabet and grammar
- Scientific career
- Fields: Linguistics
- Doctoral advisor: N. F. Yakovlev

Daud Ashkhamaf (Adyghe: Ӏашъхьэмаф Алий ыкъо Даут; Russian: Дауд Алиевич Ашхамаф; 1897 – 23 July 1946) was a Circassian linguist, folklorist, educator, and campaigner against illiteracy. He was one of the initiators and founders of Circassian studies. He is credited as one of the linguists who was involved in the standardization of the Adyghe language.

== Biography ==
Ashkhamaf was born in the aul of Khakurinokhabl, Kuban Oblast. He graduated from an Islamic school in Ufa, and graduated in 1915 as a master of the Arabic language. From 1920 to 1925, he worked as a teacher in Khakurinokhabl, an inspector of Circassian schools for the Maykop District Department of Public Education, a regional school inspector, and the director of a new Adyghe experimental demonstration school. He later pursued postgraduate studies at the Institute of Ethnic and National Cultures of the Peoples of the East in Moscow, specialising in Caucasian languages. (1925–1929) He was a postgraduate student of Professor N. F. Yakovlev, with whom he collaborated on the standardization of the Adyghe language.

In 1927, as a member of the Society for the Study of the Adyghe Autonomous Region (alongside S. Siyukhov, I. Tsey, and I. Navruzov), he stood at the origins of the research field known as "Circassian studies" and the initiative to organize the Adyghe Republican Institute of Humanitarian Studies named after T.M. Kerashev.

- 1929–1931: Scientific secretary, then deputy director of the Adyghe Research Institute of Local Lore; teacher at the Adyghe Pedagogical College.
- 1931–1934: Head of the Department of Adyghe Language and Literature at the Historical and Philological Faculty of the Krasnodar Pedagogical Institute.
- 1938–1941: Head of the Language Section of the Adyghe Research Institute of Cultural Construction.
- 1941–1946: Head of the Department of Russian Language and Literature at the Maykop Teachers' Institute.

=== Death and legacy. ===
He died on July 23, 1946. In recognition of his services as a scientist and educator, and his inextricable connection with the institute, D. A. Ashkhamaf was buried in the courtyard of the institute. In the 1960s, his remains were transferred to the city cemetery due to the construction of a new institute building. The Scientific Library of Adyghe State University (ASU) is named after Daud Ashkhamaf. A street in Maykop and a school in the aul of Khakurinokhabl also bear his name.

== Major works ==
- Lhag'u (The Path) (1926)
- Short Grammar of the Adyghe (Kyakh) Language for Schools and Self-Education (1930)
- Adyghe Language Textbook for Primary Schools (1933–1937)
- Grammar and Spelling, Vol. 2 (1933)
- Russian Language: Textbook for the 4th Grade of Adyghe Schools (1934)
- On the Principles of Constructing Adyghe Orthography (1934)
- Grammar of the Adyghe Language, Part 2: Syntax (1936)
- Adyghe Orthography (1936)
- Project of the Adyghe Alphabet on a Russian Basis (1936)
- Adyghe Orthography (1938)
- Brief Survey of Adyghe Dialects (1939)
- Adyghe Spelling Dictionary (1940)
- Grammar of the Adyghe Literary Language (1941)
- Primer of the Adyghe Language (1944)

== Sources ==
- "On the installation of a memorial plaque to the first Adyghe linguist Ashkhamaf Daud Aliyevich on the building of Khakurinokhabl Secondary School No. 1": Decision of the Council of People's Deputies of the Municipal Formation "Shovgenovsky District" dated April 19, 2017 No. 563 // Zarya. – 2017. – May 16. – P. 1.
- Abregov A. N. Scientific foresight of D. A. Ashkhamaf in the creation of the alphabet and the formation of norms of the Adyghe literary language / A. N. Abregov // Formation and development of newly written languages: to the 120th anniversary of the birth of the outstanding linguist, founder of Adyghe linguistics Ashkhamaf Daud Aliyevich: materials of the International Scientific Conference (Maykop, June 21–23, 2017). – Maykop; Krasnodar, 2017. – P. 10–13.
- Bidanok M. M. "D. A. Ashkhamaf and Adyghe orthography" // Formation and development of newly written languages.... – Maykop; Krasnodar, 2017. – P. 37–40.
- Vodozhdokov Kh. D. "D. A. Ashkhamaf and the development of the Adyghe literary language" // Adygheyskaya Pravda. – 1957. – Apr 10. – P. 3.
- Gishev N. T. "Scientific and pedagogical activity of D. A. Ashkhamaf" // Formation and development of newly written languages.... – Maykop; Krasnodar, 2017. – P. 7–10.
- Gishev N. T. "At the sources of linguistics: to the 100th anniversary of the birth of D. A. Ashkhamaf" // Sovetskaya Adygeya. – 1996. – Nov 15. – P. 3.
- Zekokh U. S. "On the creative commonwealth of N. F. Yakovlev and D. A. Ashkhamaf" // Sovetskaya Adygeya.
