= Voiceless retroflex affricate =

Consonantal sound

tʂ

ʈʂ

ꭧ
- IPA number: 105 (136)

Audio sample
- source · help

Encoding
- Entity (decimal): &#648;&#865;&#642;
- Unicode (hex): U+0288 U+0361 U+0282
- X-SAMPA: ts`
Image

A voiceless retroflex sibilant affricate is a type of consonantal sound, used in some spoken languages. The symbol in the International Phonetic Alphabet that represents this sound is ⟨ʈ͡ʂ⟩ or ⟨t̠͡ʂ⟩, often simplified to ⟨tʂ⟩. There is also a ligature ⟨ꭧ⟩, which has been retired by the International Phonetic Association but is still used. In Americanist tradition, where ⟨c⟩ is used to transcribe the affricate /ts/, the letter ⟨𝼝⟩ has sometimes been used to transcribe the affricate referenced on this page.

A laminal variant occurs in Polish cz, and an apical variant in the Indo-Aryan languages.

== Features ==
Features of a voiceless retroflex affricate:

- Its manner of articulation is sibilant affricate, which means it is produced by first stopping the air flow entirely, then directing it with the tongue to the sharp edge of the teeth, causing high-frequency turbulence.
- Its place of articulation is retroflex, which prototypically means it is articulated subapical (with the tip of the tongue curled up), but more generally, it means that it is postalveolar without being palatalized. That is, besides the prototypical subapical articulation, the tongue can be apical (pointed) or, in some fricatives, laminal (flat).
- Its phonation is voiceless, which means it is produced without vibrations of the vocal cords. In some languages the vocal cords are actively separated, so it is always voiceless; in others the cords are lax, so that it may take on the voicing of adjacent sounds.
- It is an oral consonant, which means that air is not allowed to escape through the nose.
- It is a median consonant, which means it is produced by directing the airstream down the midline of the tongue, rather than to the sides.
- Its airstream mechanism is pulmonic, which means it is articulated by pushing air only with the intercostal muscles and abdominal muscles, as in most speech sounds.

== Occurrence ==
The affricate occurs in a number of languages:

- Asturian: Speakers of the western dialects of this language use it instead of the voiced palatal fricative, writing ḷḷ instead of ll.
- Slavic languages: Polish, Belarusian, Old Czech, Serbo-Croatian; some speakers of Russian may use it instead of the voiceless alveolo-palatal affricate.
- a number of Northwest Caucasian languages have retroflex affricates that contrast in secondary articulations like labialization.
- Mandarin and other Sinitic languages.

Language		Word	IPA	Meaning	Notes
Abkhaz		аҽада	[at͡ʂʰada]	'donkey'	See Abkhaz phonology
Adyghe		чъыгы	[t͡ʂəɣə]	'tree'	See Adyghe phonology
Asturian	Some dialects	ḷḷobu	[t̠͡ʂoβu]	'wolf'	Corresponds to standard /ʎ/.
Belarusian		пачатак	[pat̠͡ʂatak]	'the beginning'	Laminal. See Belarusian phonology
Chinese	Mandarin	中文 / Zhōngwén	[ʈ̺͡ʂ̺ʊŋ˥ u̯ən˧˥]	'Chinese language'	Apical. Contrasts with aspirated form. See Mandarin phonology
Hmong	White Hmong	𖬒𖬶𖬯𖬵 / txov	[tso˨˦]	'lion' or 'tiger'	
Khanty	Eastern dialects	ҷӓңҷ	[t̠͡ʂaɳt̠͡ʂ]	'knee'	Corresponds to a voiceless retroflex fricative /ʂ/ in the northern dialects.
Khanty	Southern dialects	ҷӓңҷ	[t̠͡ʂaɳt̠͡ʂ]	'knee'	Corresponds to a voiceless retroflex fricative /ʂ/ in the northern dialects.
Mapudungun		trafoy	[t̠͡ʂa.ˈfoj]	'it got broken'	Contrasts with a voiceless postalveolar affricate: chafoy [t͡ʃa.ˈfoj] 'he/she coughed'
Northern Qiang		zhes	[t̠͡ʂəs]	'day before yesterday'	Contrasts with aspirated and voiced forms.
Polish		człowiek	[ˈt͡ʂɔvjɛk]	'man'	Laminal. See Polish phonology
Quechua	Cajamarca–Cañaris	chupa	[t̠͡ʂupə]	'tail'	
Russian		лу́чше / luchshe	[ˈɫut͡ʂʂə]	'better'	
Serbo-Croatian		чеп / čep	[t̠͡ʂe̞p]	'cork'	Apical. It may be palato-alveolar instead, depending on the dialect. See Serbo-Croatian phonology
Silesian		szczopek	[ʂt̠͡ʂopɛk]	'pike'	
Slovak		čakať	[ˈt̠͡ʂäkäc]	'to wait'	Laminal.
Spanish	Chilean	cuatro	[ˈˈkwatʂo]	'four'	Corresponding to [tɾ] in other dialects.
Torwali		ڇووو	[t̠͡ʂuwu]	'to sew'	Contrasts with aspirated form.
Vietnamese		trà	[t̠͡ʂaː˨˩]	'tea'	Some speakers.
Yi		ꍈ / zha	[t̠͡ʂa˧]	'a bit'	Contrasts with aspirated form.

== See also ==
- Index of phonetics articles

== Notes ==
Place →	Labial					Coronal										Dorsal					Laryngeal			
Manner ↓	Bilabial		Labiodental		Linguolabial		Dental		Alveolar		Postalveolar		Retroflex		(Alveolo-)palatal		Velar		Uvular		Pharyngeal/epiglottal		Glottal	
Nasal	m̥	m	ɱ̊	ɱ		n̼	n̪̊	n̪	n̥	n	n̠̊	n̠	ɳ̊	ɳ	ɲ̊	ɲ	ŋ̊	ŋ	ɴ̥	ɴ				
Plosive	p	b	p̪	b̪	t̼	d̼	t̪	d̪	t	d			ʈ	ɖ	c	ɟ	k	ɡ	q	ɢ	ʡ		ʔ	
Sibilant affricate							t̪s̪	d̪z̪	ts	dz	t̠ʃ	d̠ʒ	tʂ	dʐ	tɕ	dʑ								
Non-sibilant affricate	pɸ	bβ	p̪f	b̪v			t̪θ	d̪ð	tɹ̝̊	dɹ̝	t̠ɹ̠̊˔	d̠ɹ̠˔			cç	ɟʝ	kx	ɡɣ	qχ	ɢʁ	ʡʜ	ʡʢ	ʔh	
Sibilant fricative							s̪	z̪	s	z	ʃ	ʒ	ʂ	ʐ	ɕ	ʑ								
Non-sibilant fricative	ɸ	β	f	v	θ̼	ð̼	θ	ð	θ̠	ð̠	ɹ̠̊˔	ɹ̠˔	ɻ̊˔	ɻ˔	ç	ʝ	x	ɣ	χ	ʁ	ħ	ʕ	h	ɦ
Approximant		β̞		ʋ				ð̞		ɹ		ɹ̠		ɻ		j		ɰ						˷
Tap/flap		ⱱ̟		ⱱ					ɾ̥	ɾ			ɽ̊	ɽ						ɢ̆		ʡ̆		
Trill	ʙ̥	ʙ							r̥	r		r̠	ɽ̊r̥	ɽr					ʀ̥	ʀ	ʜ	ʢ		
Lateral affricate									tɬ	dɮ			tꞎ	d𝼅	c𝼆	ɟʎ̝	k𝼄	ɡʟ̝						
Lateral fricative							ɬ̪		ɬ	ɮ			ꞎ	𝼅	𝼆	ʎ̝	𝼄	ʟ̝						
Lateral approximant								l̪	l̥	l		l̠	ɭ̊	ɭ	ʎ̥	ʎ	ʟ̥	ʟ		ʟ̠				
Lateral tap/flap									ɺ̥	ɺ			𝼈̊	𝼈		ʎ̆		ʟ̆						

		BL	LD	D	A	PA	RF	P	V	U
Implosive	Voiced	ɓ			ɗ		ᶑ	ʄ	ɠ	ʛ
Implosive	Voiceless	ɓ̥			ɗ̥		ᶑ̊	ʄ̊	ɠ̊	ʛ̥
Ejective	Stop	pʼ			tʼ		ʈʼ	cʼ	kʼ	qʼ
Ejective	Affricate		p̪fʼ	tθʼ	tsʼ	tʃʼ	tʂʼ	tɕʼ	kxʼ	qχʼ
Ejective	Fricative	ɸʼ	fʼ	θʼ	sʼ	ʃʼ	ʂʼ	ɕʼ	xʼ	χʼ
Ejective	Lateral affricate				tɬʼ			c𝼆ʼ	k𝼄ʼ	q𝼄ʼ
Ejective	Lateral fricative				ɬʼ					
Click (top: velar; bottom: uvular)	Tenuis	kʘ qʘ		kǀ qǀ	kǃ qǃ		k𝼊 q𝼊	kǂ qǂ		
Click (top: velar; bottom: uvular)	Voiced	ɡʘ ɢʘ		ɡǀ ɢǀ	ɡǃ ɢǃ		ɡ𝼊 ɢ𝼊	ɡǂ ɢǂ		
Click (top: velar; bottom: uvular)	Nasal	ŋʘ ɴʘ		ŋǀ ɴǀ	ŋǃ ɴǃ		ŋ𝼊 ɴ𝼊	ŋǂ ɴǂ	ʞ	
Click (top: velar; bottom: uvular)	Tenuis lateral				kǁ qǁ					
Click (top: velar; bottom: uvular)	Voiced lateral				ɡǁ ɢǁ					
Click (top: velar; bottom: uvular)	Nasal lateral				ŋǁ ɴǁ					
