= Bidental consonant =

Consonant articulated with both the lower and upper teeth

Bidental consonants are consonants articulated with both the upper and lower teeth. They are normally found only in disordered speech, and are distinct from interdental consonants such as [n̪͆], which involve the tongue articulated between the teeth rather than the teeth themselves. The diacritic for bidental consonants in the extensions to the IPA is the same superscript plus subscript bridge, ⟨◌̪͆⟩:

- A bidental percussive, [ʭ], produced by striking the teeth against each other (gnashing or chattering the teeth).
- A voiceless bidental fricative, [h̪͆], a fricative made through clenched teeth with no involvement of the tongue or the lips, a "bidental (consonant) produced by air passing through the closed front teeth".
- A voiced bidental fricative, [ɦ̪͆], a fricative made through clenched teeth with no involvement of the tongue or the lips, and vibration of the vocal cords.
- Bidental aspiration of another consonant, such as [tʰ̪͆] or [dʱ̪͆].

People with hypoglossia (abnormally small tongue) may use bidental fricatives to target /s/ and /z/.

There is at least one confirmed attestation of a bidental consonant in the inventory of a natural language. The Black Sea sub-dialect of the Shapsug dialect of Adyghe has a voiceless bidental fricative where other dialects have [x], as in хы [xə] "six". It has been transcribed as ⟨x̪͆⟩, reflecting its value in other dialects, but there is no frication at the velum and it would thus be better transcribed as ⟨h̪͆⟩. The teeth themselves are the only constriction: "The lips [are] fully open, the teeth clenched and the tongue flat, the air passing between the teeth; the sound is intermediate between [ʃ] and [f]".
