= Voiced labial–velar approximant =

Consonantal sound represented by ⟨w⟩ in IPA

w
- IPA number: 170

Audio sample
- source · help

Encoding
- Entity (decimal): &#119;
- Unicode (hex): U+0077
- X-SAMPA: w
- Braille: ⠺ (braille pattern dots-2456)
Image

A voiced labial–velar approximant is a type of consonantal sound, used in some spoken languages. It is the sound denoted by the letter ⟨w⟩ in the English alphabet; likewise, the symbol in the International Phonetic Alphabet that represents this sound is ⟨w⟩, or occasionally broken down as ⟨ɰʷ⟩. In most languages it is the semivocalic counterpart of a close back rounded vowel [u]. In inventory charts of languages with other labialized velar consonants, /w/ will be placed in the same column as those consonants. When consonant charts have only labial and velar columns, /w/ may be placed in the velar column, labial column, or both. The placement may have more to do with convenience or phonological criteria than with phonetics.

For a labialized post-palatal approximant—sometimes also described as a voiced labial–prevelar approximant—which is more fronted in the place of articulation than a prototypical labial–velar approximant, see Labial–palatal approximant § Post-palatal.

== Features ==
Features of a voiced labial–velar approximant:

- Its manner of articulation is approximant, which means it is produced by narrowing the vocal tract at the place of articulation, but not enough to produce a turbulent airstream. The type of approximant is glide or semivowel. The term glide emphasizes the characteristic of movement (or 'glide') of /w/ from the /u/ vowel position to a following vowel position. The term semivowel emphasizes that, although the sound is vocalic in nature, it is not 'syllabic' (it does not form the nucleus of a syllable).
- Its place of articulation is labialized velar, which means it is articulated with the back part of the tongue raised toward the soft palate (the velum) while rounding the lips. Some languages, such as Japanese and perhaps the Northern Iroquoian languages, have a sound typically transcribed as /w/ where the lips are compressed, or in some cases may not have labial features at all. Close transcriptions may avoid the symbol [w] in such cases and instead use [ɰ], or may use the under-rounding diacritic [w̜].
- Its phonation is voiced, which means the vocal cords vibrate during the articulation.
- It is an oral consonant, which means that air is not allowed to escape through the nose.
- It is a median consonant, which means it is produced by directing the airstream down the midline of the tongue, rather than to the sides.
- Its airstream mechanism is pulmonic, which means it is articulated by pushing air only with the intercostal muscles and abdominal muscles, as in most speech sounds.

== Occurrence ==
Language		Word	IPA	Meaning	Notes
Abkhaz		ауаҩы / awaẅy / აუაჳჷ	[awaˈɥə]	'human'	See Abkhaz phonology
Adyghe		о / o	[wɐ]	'you (singular)'	See Adyghe phonology
Alemannic	Bernese	Giel	[ɡ̊iə̯w]	'boy'	Allophone of [l]
Arabic	Modern Standard	وَرْد / ward	[ward]	'rose'	See Arabic phonology
Assamese		ৱাশ্বিংটন / Washington	[wasiŋtɔn]	'Washington'	
Basque		lau	[law]	'four'	
Belarusian		воўк / voŭk	[vɔ̝wk]	'wolf'	See Belarusian phonology
Bengali		ওয়াদা / wada	[wá̠d̪a̠ˑ]	'promise'	Fortitional allophone of the semivowels [o̯] and [u̯], especially in loan words. See Bengali phonology
Berber		ⴰⵡⴰⵍ / äwäl	[æwæl]	'speech'	
Breton		nav	[ˈnaw]	'nine'	
Bulgarian	Colloquial	лопата / lopata	[woˈpat̪ɐ]	'shovel'	Contemporary pronunciation of /ɫ/, an ongoing sound change. See Bulgarian phonology.
Bulgarian	Pernik dialects	лопата / lopata	[woˈpat̪ɐ]	'shovel'	This dialect has a long-standing tradition of pronouncing /ɫ/ as /w/, similar to the Polish language. Independent of the similar sound change happening in the standard language.
Bulgarian	Standard Bulgarian	уиски / uiski	[ˈwisk̟i]	'whiskey'	Appears in borrowings. See Bulgarian phonology
Burmese		ဝါဒ / wadạ	[wàda̰]	'belief'	
Catalan	Most dialects	quart	[ˈkwɑɾt̪]	'fourth'	Post-lexically after /k/ and /ɡ/. See Catalan phonology
Catalan	Most dialects	seuós	[səˈwos̺]	'greasy'	Semivowel. See Catalan phonology
Chinese	Cantonese	挖 / waat	[wɑːt̚˧]	'dig'	See Cantonese phonology
Chinese	Mandarin	挖 / wā	[wa̠˥]	'dig'	See Mandarin phonology
Danish		hav	[hɑw]	'ocean'	Allophone of [v]
Dutch	Colloquial	kouwe	[ˈkʌu̯wə]	'cold'	Lenited allophone of /d/ after /ʌu̯/. Corresponds to /d/ in the standard language (cf. koude). See Dutch phonology
Dutch	Standard Surinamese	welp	[wɛɫp]	'cub'	May also occur in this context in some continental Dutch accents and/or dialects. Corresponds to [ʋ] in most of the Netherlands and to [β̞] in Belgium and (southern) parts of the Netherlands. See Dutch phonology
English		weep	[wiːp]	'weep'	See English phonology
French		oui	[wi]	'yes'	See French phonology
German		Quelle	[kweːlə]	'source'	Some regions
Hawaiian		wikiwiki	[wikiwiki]	'fast'	May also be realized as [v]. See Hawaiian phonology
Hebrew	Mizrahi	כּוֹחַ / kowaḥ	[ˈkowaħ]	'power'	See Modern Hebrew phonology
Hebrew	Yemenite	דָּוִד / Dōwīḏ	[dɔːˈwiːð]	'David'	See Modern Hebrew phonology
Hindustani	Hindi	विश्वास / viśvās	[ʋɪʃwäːs]	'belief'	Allophone of /ʋ/. See Hindustani phonology
Hindustani	Urdu	وشواس / viśvās	[ʋɪʃwäːs]	'belief'	Allophone of /ʋ/. See Hindustani phonology
Irish		vóta	[ˈwoːt̪ˠə]	'vote'	See Irish phonology
Italian		uomo	[ˈwɔːmo]	'man'	See Italian phonology
Kabardian		уэ / wə	[wɐ]	'you (singular)'	
Karakalpak		туўыў / tuwıw	[tʰuˈwuw]	'birth'	
Kazakh		ауа / aua	[ɑ̝wɑ̝́]	'air'	
Korean		왜가리 / waegari	[wɛɡɐɾi]	'heron'	See Korean phonology
Kyrgyz		аба / aba	[ɑ̀w̜ɑ]	'air'	Lenited allophone of /b/. See Kyrgyz phonology
Lao		ຫວານ / wan	[wǎːn]	'sweet'	See Lao phonology
Luxembourgish		zwee	[t͡swe̝ː]	'two'	Allophone of /v/ after /k, t͡s, ʃ/. See Luxembourgish phonology
Malay		wang	[waŋ]	'money'	
Malayalam		ഉവ്വ / uvva	[uwːɐ]	'yes'	/ʋ/ around rounded vowels for some speakers.
Mayan	Yucatec	witz	[wit͡s]	'mountain'	
Mongolian		гавал / ᠭᠠᠪᠠᠯᠠ / gawal	[ɢ̥á̠w̜ɐ̆ɬ]	'skull'	
Nepali		हावा / hawa	[ɦa̠wa̠]	'wind'	See Nepali phonology
Nuxalk		wntsʼ	[wnt͡sʼ]	'to kill'	
Odia		ଅଗ୍ରୱାଲ୍ / ogrowal	[ɔgɾɔwäl]	'Agrawal'	
Pashto		ﻭﺍﺭ / wār	[wɑr]	'one time'	
Persian	Dari	وَرزِش / warzish	[warˈzɪʃ]	'sport'	May approach /ʋ/ in some regional dialects.
Persian	Farsi	نَ‍‍و / nov	[now]	'new'	Only in a diphthong or colloquially.
Polish		łaska	[ˈwäskä]	'grace'	See Polish phonology. Corresponds to [ɫ] in older pronunciation and eastern dialects.
Portuguese	Most dialects	quando	[ˈkwɐ̃du]	'when'	Post-lexically after /k/ and /ɡ/. See Portuguese phonology
Portuguese	Most dialects	boa	[ˈbow.wɐ]	'good' (f.)	Epenthetic glide or allophone of /u/, following a stressed rounded vowel and preceding an unrounded one.
Portuguese	General Brazilian	qual	[ˈkwaw]	'which'	Allophone of /l/ in coda position for most Brazilian dialects.
Romanian		dulău	[d̪uˈl̪əw]	'mastiff'	See Romanian phonology
Russian		волк / volk	[vowk]	'wolf'	Western dialects.
Serbo-Croatian	Croatian	vuk	[wûːk]	'wolf'	Allophone of /ʋ/ before /u/. See Serbo-Croatian phonology
Slovene		cerkev	[ˈt͡sèːrkəw]	'church'	Allophone of /ʋ/ in the syllable coda. Voiceless [ʍ] before voiceless consonants. See Slovene phonology
Sotho		sewa	[ˈsewa]	'epidemic'	See Sesotho phonology
Svan		კუ̂ენ / k’wen	[kʼwen]	'marten'	
Spanish	Standard	cuanto	[ˈkwãn̪t̪o̞]	'as much'	
Spanish	Some dialects	Náhuatl	[ˈnawät̪l]	'Nahuatl'	May also be fricative [w̝] ~ [ɣ̞ʷ]. See Spanish phonology
Spanish	Some dialects	ese huevo	[ˈese̞ ˈweβ̞o̞]	'that egg'	May also be fricative [w̝] ~ [ɣ̞ʷ]. See Spanish phonology
Swahili		mwanafunzi	[mwɑnɑfunzi]	'student'	
Swedish	Central Standard				Labialized approximant consonant; allophone of /ɡ/ in casual speech before the protruded vowels /ɔ, oː/. See Swedish phonology
Tagalog		araw	[ˈɐɾaw]	'day'	See Tagalog phonology
Thai		แหวน / waen	[wɛ̌ːn]	'ring'	See Thai phonology
Toki Pona		wile	[wile]	'to want'	
Vietnamese	Standard	uỷ	[ʔwi˧˩]	'to delegate'	See Vietnamese phonology
Vietnamese	Southern	quê	[wej˧˧]	'hometown'	
Ukrainian		любов / liubov	[lʲubɔw]	'love'	See Ukrainian phonology
Welsh		gwae	[ɡwaɨ]	'woe'	See Welsh phonology
West Frisian		skowe	[skoːwə]	'to shove'	

=== Nasal ===
Nasalized voiced labial–velar approximant

w̃

ɰ̃ʷ

Audio sample
- source · help

A nasalized voiced labial–velar approximant is a type of consonantal sound used in some languages. The symbol in the International Phonetic Alphabet that represents this sound is typically ⟨w̃⟩ (a nasalized ⟨w⟩), though for preciseness ⟨ɰ̃ʷ⟩ (a nasalized and labialized ⟨ɰ⟩) may also be seen.

Language		Word	IPA	Meaning	Notes
Epena Pedee		náwe	[ˈnãw̃ẽ]	'mother'	Nasal syllable allophone in free variation with a nasalized fricative [β̃].
Guaraní	Paraguayan	guaraníme	[ɰ̃ʷãɾ̃ãˈnĩmẽ]	'in Guarani'	Allophone of /ɰ/ in the digraph ⟨gu⟩, nasalized due to vowel–consonant harmony.
Kaingang		[w̃ĩ]		'to see'	Possible word-initial realization of /w/ before a nasal vowel.
Polish		są	[sɔw̃]	'they are'	See Polish phonology
Portuguese	Most dialects	são	[sɐ̃w̃]	'saint', 'they are'	Allophone of /w/ after nasal vowels. See Portuguese phonology
Portuguese	Some dialects	muamba	[ˈmw̃ɐ̃bɐ]	'smuggling', 'jobbery', 'stash'	Non-syllabic allophone of /u/ between nasal sounds.
Marathi		संशय / saṃśay	[sə̃w̃ʃəe̯]	'doubt'	Anuswara (ṁ) preceding र (r), व (v), श (ś), ष (ṣ), स (s), ह (h) or ज्ञ (jñ/dnya) is rendered as 'w̃'.
Seri		cmiique	[ˈkw̃ĩːkːɛ]	'person'	Allophone of /m/.
Shipibo		banwan	[βɐ̃ˈw̃ɐ̃]	'parrot'	Allophone of /w/ after nasal vowels.
Telugu		ఆమ్లం / āmlaṃ	[aːw̃alaw̃]	'acid'	Common colloquial pronunciation of intervocalic and final m. May also be a [ʋ̃].
Uwa		táw̃aya	[ˈtaw̃aja]	'yellow'	
Yoruba		wọ́n	[w̃ɔ̃́]	'they'	Allophone of /w/ before nasal vowels.

== See also ==
- Voiceless labial–velar approximant
- Voiced bilabial approximant
- Voiced bilabial flap

== Notes ==
Place →	Labial					Coronal										Dorsal					Laryngeal			
Manner ↓	Bilabial		Labiodental		Linguolabial		Dental		Alveolar		Postalveolar		Retroflex		(Alveolo-)palatal		Velar		Uvular		Pharyngeal/epiglottal		Glottal	
Nasal	m̥	m	ɱ̊	ɱ		n̼	n̪̊	n̪	n̥	n	n̠̊	n̠	ɳ̊	ɳ	ɲ̊	ɲ	ŋ̊	ŋ	ɴ̥	ɴ				
Plosive	p	b	p̪	b̪	t̼	d̼	t̪	d̪	t	d			ʈ	ɖ	c	ɟ	k	ɡ	q	ɢ	ʡ		ʔ	
Sibilant affricate							t̪s̪	d̪z̪	ts	dz	t̠ʃ	d̠ʒ	tʂ	dʐ	tɕ	dʑ								
Non-sibilant affricate	pɸ	bβ	p̪f	b̪v			t̪θ	d̪ð	tɹ̝̊	dɹ̝	t̠ɹ̠̊˔	d̠ɹ̠˔			cç	ɟʝ	kx	ɡɣ	qχ	ɢʁ	ʡʜ	ʡʢ	ʔh	
Sibilant fricative							s̪	z̪	s	z	ʃ	ʒ	ʂ	ʐ	ɕ	ʑ								
Non-sibilant fricative	ɸ	β	f	v	θ̼	ð̼	θ	ð	θ̠	ð̠	ɹ̠̊˔	ɹ̠˔	ɻ̊˔	ɻ˔	ç	ʝ	x	ɣ	χ	ʁ	ħ	ʕ	h	ɦ
Approximant		β̞		ʋ				ð̞		ɹ		ɹ̠		ɻ		j		ɰ						˷
Tap/flap		ⱱ̟		ⱱ					ɾ̥	ɾ			ɽ̊	ɽ						ɢ̆		ʡ̆		
Trill	ʙ̥	ʙ							r̥	r		r̠	ɽ̊r̥	ɽr					ʀ̥	ʀ	ʜ	ʢ		
Lateral affricate									tɬ	dɮ			tꞎ	d𝼅	c𝼆	ɟʎ̝	k𝼄	ɡʟ̝						
Lateral fricative							ɬ̪		ɬ	ɮ			ꞎ	𝼅	𝼆	ʎ̝	𝼄	ʟ̝						
Lateral approximant								l̪	l̥	l		l̠	ɭ̊	ɭ	ʎ̥	ʎ	ʟ̥	ʟ		ʟ̠				
Lateral tap/flap									ɺ̥	ɺ			𝼈̊	𝼈		ʎ̆		ʟ̆						

		BL	LD	D	A	PA	RF	P	V	U
Implosive	Voiced	ɓ			ɗ		ᶑ	ʄ	ɠ	ʛ
Implosive	Voiceless	ɓ̥			ɗ̥		ᶑ̊	ʄ̊	ɠ̊	ʛ̥
Ejective	Stop	pʼ			tʼ		ʈʼ	cʼ	kʼ	qʼ
Ejective	Affricate		p̪fʼ	tθʼ	tsʼ	tʃʼ	tʂʼ	tɕʼ	kxʼ	qχʼ
Ejective	Fricative	ɸʼ	fʼ	θʼ	sʼ	ʃʼ	ʂʼ	ɕʼ	xʼ	χʼ
Ejective	Lateral affricate				tɬʼ			c𝼆ʼ	k𝼄ʼ	q𝼄ʼ
Ejective	Lateral fricative				ɬʼ					
Click (top: velar; bottom: uvular)	Tenuis	kʘ qʘ		kǀ qǀ	kǃ qǃ		k𝼊 q𝼊	kǂ qǂ		
Click (top: velar; bottom: uvular)	Voiced	ɡʘ ɢʘ		ɡǀ ɢǀ	ɡǃ ɢǃ		ɡ𝼊 ɢ𝼊	ɡǂ ɢǂ		
Click (top: velar; bottom: uvular)	Nasal	ŋʘ ɴʘ		ŋǀ ɴǀ	ŋǃ ɴǃ		ŋ𝼊 ɴ𝼊	ŋǂ ɴǂ	ʞ	
Click (top: velar; bottom: uvular)	Tenuis lateral				kǁ qǁ					
Click (top: velar; bottom: uvular)	Voiced lateral				ɡǁ ɢǁ					
Click (top: velar; bottom: uvular)	Nasal lateral				ŋǁ ɴǁ					
