= Polish morphology =

The morphology of the Polish language is characterised by a fairly regular system of inflection (conjugation and declension) as well as word formation. Certain regular or common alternations apply across the Polish morphological system, affecting word formation and inflection of various parts of speech. These are described below, mostly with reference to the orthographic rather than the phonological system for clarity.

== Morphophonologic alternations ==
- Consonants in clusters and at the end of words are affected by the voicing rules; these are generally not reflected in the spelling. For example, the d in sąd ("court") is pronounced /t/, while in inflected forms such as the plural sądy it is pronounced /d/.
- The vowels i and y have restricted distribution: i does not occur (except in some words of foreign origin) after c, cz, d, dz, dż, ł, r, sz, t, ż/rz, while y does not occur after k, g, l and palatal consonants. This means that in certain inflectional forms i appears in place of the expected y or vice versa (for example, the genitive of mąka "flour" is mąki, not *mąky).
- The declension endings starting with the vowel e or i (except for the instrumental singular -em) have the effect of palatalizing the preceding consonant. Due to historical developments, the actual effect is dependent on the consonant.
    - [ɲ t͡s d͡z t͡ʂ d͡ʐ t͡ɕ d͡ʑ ʂ ʐ ɕ ʑ l j] don't change
      - i changes to y after [t͡s d͡z t͡ʂ d͡ʐ ʂ ʐ w]
      - adjectival stem that ends in sz ż + masculine personal plural -i > si zi (e.g. starszy – starsi)
    - [m] > [mj] (e.g. tom – tomie)
    - [n] > [ɲ] (e.g. dziewczyna – dziewczynie)
    - [p] > [pj] (e.g. mop – mopie)
    - [b] > [bj] (e.g. garb – garbie)
    - [t] > [t͡ɕ] (e.g. kot – kocie)
    - [d] > [d͡ʑ] (e.g. miód – miodzie)
    - [f] > [fj] (e.g. graf – grafie)
    - [v] > [vj] (e.g. rękaw – rękawie)
    - [s] > [ɕ] (e.g. las – lesie)
    - [z] > [ʑ] (e.g. gaz – gazie)
    - [w] > [l] (e.g. dół – dole)
    - [r] > [ʐ] (spelled rz; e.g. hangar – hangarze)
    - [k] > [t͡s]
      - a noun ending in k + -em > kiem
      - a noun ending in k + plural i > ki or cy
    - [ɡ] > [d͡z]
      - a noun ending in g + -em > giem
      - a noun ending in g + plural i > gi or dzy
    - [x] > [ʂ]
      - a noun ending in ch + plural i > si or chy
- Some words are subject to certain vowel alternations, caused by historical sound changes in Polish. The alternations are as follows (they do not apply to all words containing these vowels):
  - Alternations that depend on whether the syllable is closed or open:
    - ó–o (e.g. rób – robić)
    - ą–ę (e.g. dąb – dęby)
    - (i)e (occasionally (i)o)-∅ (e.g. kocioł – kotły, matek – matka, pies – psy)
  - Alternations that take effect when the following consonant is modified by a palatalizing ending
    - a–e (e.g. wiara – wierze)
    - o (or ó)–e (e.g. kościół – kościele)

== Nouns ==
Declensions are generally divided into hard and soft declensions. Soft declensions are used when the stem of the noun ends in a soft (postalveolar or palatal-like) consonant in all forms, while hard declensions are used by nouns with stems ending in a hard consonant in some (but not necessarily all) forms.

Some nouns follow the adjectival declension (see below), particularly if they are masculine nouns ending in -y/i. This applies even to some words with no apparent adjectival connection, such as Jerzy ("George"). Certain neuter nouns, mostly place names such as Zakopane and voivodeship names such as Wielkopolskie when used alone as nouns, follow the adjectival declension but take -em rather than -ym in the instrumental and locative.

The following generalisations can be made for the inflection of all nouns:

- The nominative and vocative plural are always identical.
- For neuter nouns, the nominative, accusative and vocative are always identical in both singular and plural.
- The accusative of masculine nouns is identical to either the nominative or the genitive.
- The locative, dative and instrumental plural almost always have the same endings (-ach, -om, -ami) no matter how the noun is declined.

=== Masculine nouns ===
Masculine nouns typically end in a consonant and those inflect according to the masculine declension. Masculine nouns ending in -a (usually personal) follow the feminine declension in the singular, and the masculine declension in the plural. The same applies to male personal names in -o (as Kościuszko; also tato "dad"), although familiar first name forms like Franio follow the masculine declension throughout.

The following table shows the endings shared by all masculine nouns:

		singular	plural
nominative		–	*
accusative	inanimate	–	*
accusative	animate	-a	*
accusative	personal	-a	*
genitive	animate	-a	*
genitive	inanimate	-a / -u	*
locative		*	-ach
dative		*	-om
instrumental		-em	-ami^{1}
vocative		same as the locative^{2}	same as the nominative

^{1} Some nouns ending in a palatal consonant (for example gość, koń, liść) may take the ending -mi instead of -ami; also pieniądz – pieniędzmi.

^{2} Except for personal nouns ending in -ec, mainly chłopiec – chłopcze ("boy"), młodzieniec – młodzieńcze ("a young person"), ojciec – ojcze ("father"), starzec – starcze ("an old person").

The rest of the cases are different for 5 different declension groups:

- declension I – all nouns ending in ć, dź, ń, ś, ź, l, j and nouns ending in p, b, m, w that gain palatalization in the oblique cases (for example karp – karpia, paw – pawia)
  - dative singular ending is -owi
  - locative singular ending is -u
  - nominative plural is -e for non-personal nouns, and -e or -owie for personal nouns
  - genitive plural is -i or -ów
- declension II – all nouns ending in c, cz, dz, dż, rz, sz, ż
  - dative singular ending is -owi or -u
  - locative singular ending is -u
  - nominative plural is -e for non-personal nouns, and -e, -y or -owie for personal nouns
  - genitive plural is -y or -ów
- declension III – all nouns ending in k, g, ch
  - dative singular ending is -owi
  - locative singular ending is -u
  - nominative plural is -ki, -gi, -chy, respectively, for non-personal nouns, and -owie or -cy, -dzy, -si, respectively, for personal nouns
  - genitive plural is -ów
- declension IV – all nouns ending in d, f, ł, n, r, s, t, z and nouns ending in p, b, m, w that do not gain palatalization in the oblique cases
  - dative singular ending is -owi or -u
  - locative singular ending is -e
  - nominative plural is -y for non-personal nouns, and -i or -owie for personal nouns (the sequence r + i turns into rzy)
  - genitive plural is -ów
- declension V – personal nouns ending in -anin
  - dative singular ending is -owi
  - locative singular ending is -e
  - nominative plural is -anie
  - genitive plural is -an or -anów

The following table compares all five declension groups:

		I	II	III	IV	V
dative singular		-owi	-owi / -u	-owi	-owi / -u	-owi
locative singular		-u			-e	
nominative plural	personal	-e / -owie	-e / -y / -owie	-cy, -dzy, -si / -owie	-i (-y) / -owie	-anie
nominative plural	non-personal	-e		-ki, -gi, -chy	-y	N/A
genitive plural		-i / -ów	-y / -ów	-ów		-an / -anów

Note also:

- Many personal nouns, especially those ending in -og (equivalent to the English -ogist), can take both forms of the nominative plural, with one form more frequent than the other for no apparent reason.
- Personal nouns can become non-personal in the plural to form "depreciative forms", which convey negative attitude; for example policjanty instead of policjanci ("policemen") or ministry instead of ministrowie ("ministers"). Sometimes the ending may be the same, but the change of gender is conveyed through adjectives and pronouns agreeing with the noun, for example te wstrętne burżuje instead of ci wstrętni burżuje ("those disgusting bourgeois").

Irregularities in masculine nouns:

- The vocative singular of Bóg ("God") is Boże.
- In the plural, the stem of brat ("brother") is braci- (nominative bracia, genitive braci, instrumental braćmi).
- The stem of chrzest ("baptism") for oblique cases is chrzt- (genitive chrztu), inflected according to the fourth declension (except for the accusative singular, which is equivalent to the nominative).
- Człowiek ("person, human") has a suppletive plural ludzie, inflected according to the first declension (the genitive is ludzi, the instrumental is ludźmi).
- The declension of dech (archaic for "breath", used mainly in set phrases) is tchu, tchu/tchowi, dech, tchem, tchu, tchu.
- The noun deszcz ("rain") has an archaic genitive dżdżu, used in the phrase łaknąć/pragnąć jak kania dżdżu ("to desire dearly", lit. "to desire like a kite" or "to desire like a parasol mushroom" – both names, of the bird and of the mushroom, are homonymous in Polish and there's no consensus as to which the proverb refers).
- The vocative singular of ksiądz ("priest") is księże. Its plural declension is księża, księży, księżom, księży, księżmi, księża.
- The declension of the noun książę ("prince") is książę, księcia, księciu, księcia, księciem, księciu, książę in the singular, and książęta, książąt, książętom, książeta, książętami, książętom, książętami, książęta in the plural.
- The genitive plural of przyjaciel ("friend") is przyjaciół, the dative plural is przyjaciołom, the instrumental plural is przyjaciółmi, and the locative plural is przyjaciołach.
- The nouns pan ("Mr"), syn ("son") and dom ("house") have -u in the locative and vocative singular despite belonging to the fourth declension group; pan has vocative panie.
- Rok ("year") has a suppletive neuter plural lata.
- The declension of the nouns sędzia ("judge") and hrabia ("count") is sędzia/hrabia, sędziego/hrabiego, sędziemu/hrabiemu, sędziego/hrabiego, sędzią/hrabią, sędzi/hrabi, sędzio/hrabio in the singular, and sędziowie/hrabiowie, sędziów/hrabi, sędziom/hrabiom, sędziów/hrabiów, sędziami/hrabiami, sędziach/hrabiach, sędziowie/hrabiowie.
- A few masculines have plurals in -a, usually as an alternative to the regular plural (e.g. the nominative plural of cud can be cudy or cuda).

=== Feminine nouns ===
Feminine nouns usually end in -a, although a few end in -i. These are the "a-stem" nouns. A number of feminine nouns ends in a soft or hardened consonant; these are "i-stem" nouns.

The following table shows the feminine a-stem declension:

	Hard declension		Soft declension	
	Singular	Plural	Singular	Plural
Nominative	mapa	mapy	granica	granice
Accusative	mapę	mapy	granicę	granice
Genitive	mapy	map	granicy	granic
Locative	mapie	mapach	granicy	granicach
Dative	mapie	mapom	granicy	granicom
Instrumental	mapą	mapami	granicą	granicami
Vocative	mapo	mapy	granico	granice

- Feminine nouns in -i (like gospodyni "housewife") have this -i only in the nominative and vocative singular. In all other cases they decline like soft a-stem nouns.
- Soft feminine nouns that are familiar forms of personal names (like Ania, from Anna) have a vocative in -u (Aniu) or with no ending.

The following table shows the feminine i-stem declension:

	Singular	Plural
Nominative	noc	noce
Accusative	noc	noce
Genitive	nocy	nocy
Locative	nocy	nocach
Dative	nocy	nocom
Instrumental	nocą	nocami
Vocative	nocy	noce

- Some feminine i-stem nouns, especially those in -ość (a suffix used to form nouns from adjectives) have N/A/V/G plural in -y/i rather than -e. Examples include rzecz "thing," and mysz "mouse," both ending in -y.
- Nouns with the suffix -ość, as well as a few other nouns (such as gość "guest" and dłoń "palm") form the instrumental plural by adding just -mi rather than -ami.

=== Neuter nouns ===
Neuter nouns end in -o or -e, these are the hard and soft neuter "o-stems". A few end in -ę, the so-called "n-stem" and "t-stem" nouns.

The following table shows the neuter o-stem declension:

	Hard declension		Soft declension	
	Singular	Plural	Singular	Plural
Nominative	miasto	miasta	pole	pola
Accusative	miasto	miasta	pole	pola
Genitive	miasta	miast	pola	pól
Locative	mieście	miastach	polu	polach
Dative	miastu	miastom	polu	polom
Instrumental	miastem	miastami	polem	polami
Vocative	miasto	miasta	pole	pola

- Some neuter nouns take -y/i in the genitive plural, particularly those ending in -e that have a prefix (e.g. narzędzie "tool", G pl. narzędzi).
- Some neuter nouns that were borrowed from Latin end in -um. These are indeclinable in the singular (always -um) but follow the hard or soft neuter declension in the plural.

The neuter n-stem and neuter t-stem nouns decline as soft neuter o-stems in the singular but as hard neuter o-stems in the plural. In addition, they have shortened nominative/accusative/vocative singular forms ending in -ę.

	n-stem declension		t-stem declension	
	Singular	Plural	Singular	Plural
Nominative	imię	imiona	cielę	cielęta
Accusative	imię	imiona	cielę	cielęta
Genitive	imienia	imion	cielęcia	cieląt
Locative	imieniu	imionach	cielęciu	cielętach
Dative	imieniu	imionom	cielęciu	cielętom
Instrumental	imieniem	imionami	cielęciem	cielętami
Vocative	imię	imiona	cielę	cielęta

=== Irregular nouns ===
Notable irregular forms include the following:

- dziecko ("child") has plural N/A/V/G dzieci (I dziećmi; D dzieciom etc.).
- ręka ("arm, hand") has N/A/V plural ręce (also alternative L singular ręku and I plural rękoma); oko ("eye") and ucho ("ear") have plural oczy/uszy etc. (G oczu/uszu). These derive from old dual forms.
- pani ("lady, Mrs") has accusative singular panią.

=== Invariant nouns ===
The following types of nouns are generally invariant, and do not inflect at all:

- Names of letters
- Some foreign-derived words that do not fit any standard pattern
- Most foreign place names (except well-known ones that fit a standard pattern)
- Personal names of females that don't end in -a
- Normally masculine nouns used as feminines to refer to women (often preceded by pani, which is declined, as in pani profesor)
- Titles of works etc. that do not have the form of nouns/adjectives
- Nouns that are already inflected (e.g. Chrobrego, a genitive, which can be used unchanged in all cases as short for a street name such as ulica Chrobrego)
- Names preceded by a specifying noun (for example wieś Dębowo, "the village of Dębowo", where only wieś is declined
- Names of gminas such as gmina Czersk)

Foreign personal names of males are declined if at all possible; some special rules are applied depending on the original language. Those that end "-y" or "-i" generally follow the adjectival declension, but these are treated as -i, i.e. the previous consonant is soft, and this is shown in inflected written forms such as Tony'ego.

== Adjectives ==
Adjectives agree with the noun they modify in terms of gender and number. They are declined according to the following pattern (dumny means "proud"):

		Singular			Plural		
		Masculine	Feminine	Neuter	Masculine	Feminine	Neuter
Nominative, Vocative	personal	dumny	dumna	dumne	dumni	dumne	
Nominative, Vocative	non-personal	dumny	dumna	dumne	dumne	dumne	
Accusative	personal	dumnego	dumną	dumne	dumnych	dumne	
Accusative	non-personal animate	dumnego	dumną	dumne	dumne	dumne	
Accusative	inanimate	dumny	dumną	dumne	dumne	dumne	
Genitive		dumnego	dumnej	dumnego	dumnych		
Locative		dumnym	dumnej	dumnym	dumnych		
Dative		dumnemu	dumnej	dumnemu	dumnym		
Instrumental		dumnym	dumną	dumnym	dumnymi		

Most short adjectives have a comparative form in -szy or -iejszy, and a superlative obtained by prefixing naj- to the comparative. For example, tani ("cheap") has the forms tańszy ("cheaper") and najtańszy ("cheapest") (these forms are inflected like normal adjectives). The following principles apply:

- The longer ending -iejszy is used in certain adjectives, especially those in consonant+ny, for pronounceability: ładny–ładniejszy ("pretty–prettier").
- The adjectival ending -ki or -oki is dropped, as in krótki–krótszy ("short(er)"), szeroki–szerszy ("wide(r)").
- Irregular comparatives include lepszy (from dobry "good"), gorszy (from zły "bad"), większy (from duży "big"), mniejszy (from mały "small"), węższy (from wąski "narrow"), dłuższy (from długi "long").
- For adjectives that do not have such forms, the words bardziej ("more") and najbardziej ("most") are used before the adjective to make comparative and superlative phrases.

Adverbs are formed from adjectives with the ending -ie, or in some cases -o. Comparatives of adverbs are formed (where they exist) with the ending -iej. Superlatives have the prefix naj- as for adjectives. Irregular comparatives include lepiej ("better"), gorzej ("worse"), więcej ("more", also bardziej when not concerned with quantity, from bardzo "very"), mniej ("less").

== Pronouns ==
This section gives the declensions of Polish pronouns. For information on meanings and usage, see Pronouns in the article on Polish grammar.

=== Personal pronouns ===
- 1st person singular N ja, G/A/L mnie, D mnie (clitic mi), I mną
- 2nd person singular familiar N ty, G/A ciebie (clitic cię), D tobie (clitic ci), I tobą, L tobie
- 3rd person singular masculine N on, G/A jego/niego (clitic go), D jemu/niemu (clitic mu), I/L nim
- 3rd person singular feminine N ona, G/D jej/niej, A ją/nią, I nią, L niej
- 3rd person singular neuter N ono, A je/nie, other cases as masculine
- 1st person plural N my, G/A/L nas, D nam, I nami
- 2nd person plural familiar N wy, G/A/L was, D wam, I wami
- 3rd person plural masculine personal N oni, G/A ich/nich, D im/nim, I nimi, L nich
- 3rd person plural other N one, A je/nie, other cases as for masculine personal

Polite 2nd person forms: pan (plural panowie) and pani (plural panie) are declined like those nouns. The mixed-sex form państwo (which can also be used as a noun to refer to a mixed-sex group or couple) is masculine personal plural, but declines like the neuter noun państwo ("state, country") except that the accusative is państwa (like the genitive) and the locative państwu.

Case	Singular							Plural						
Case	1st	2nd			3rd			1st	2nd				3rd	
Case	1st	fam.	pol.		masc.	neut.	fem.	1st	fam.	pol.			masc. pers.	non- masc.
Case	1st	fam.	masc.	fem.	masc.	neut.	fem.	1st	fam.	masc.	epic.	fem.	masc. pers.	non- masc.
Nominative (mianownik)	ja	ty	pan	pani	on	ono	ona	my	wy	panowie	państwo	panie	oni	one
Vocative (wołacz)		ty	panie	pani					wy	panowie	państwo	panie		
Accusative (biernik)	mnie	ciebie (cię)	pana	panią	(je/nie)go	je nie	ją	nas	was	panów	państwa	panie	(n)ich	je nie
Genitive (dopełniacz)	mnie	ciebie (cię)	pana	pani	(je/nie)go	(je/nie)go	jej niej	nas	was	panów	państwa	pań	(n)ich	(n)ich
Locative (miejscownik)	mnie	tobie	panu	pani	nim		niej	nas	was	panach	państwu	paniach	nich	
Dative (celownik)	mnie (mi)	tobie (ci)	panu	pani	(je/nie)mu		jej niej	nam	wam	panom	państwu	paniom	(n)im	
Instrumental (narzędnik)	mną	tobą	panem	panią	nim		nią	nami	wami	panami	państwem	paniami	nimi	

=== Reflexive pronouns ===
The declension of się is shown below. The form "siebie" is used when the pronoun is disconnected from the verb.

Nom.	Gen.	Dat.	Acc.	Inst.	Loc.
–	się/siebie	sobie	się/siebie	sobą	sobie

=== Possessive pronouns ===
Possessive pronouns such as mój, twój, nasz, wasz are declined like adjectives (moja, moje etc.), as are swój and pański. The third-person forms jego, jej and ich are invariant, as are other forms identical to genitives (pana etc.)

Declension of mój
	masculine	feminine	neuter	virile plural	nonvirile plural
Nominative	mój	moja	moje	moi	moje
Genitive	mojego	mojej	mojego	moich	moich
Dative	mojemu	mojej	mojemu	moim	moim
Accusative	mojego/mój	moją	moje	moich	moje
Instrumental	moim	moją	moim	moimi	moimi
Locative	moim	mojej	moim	moich	moich

Declension of twój
	masculine	feminine	neuter	virile plural	nonvirile plural
Nominative	twój	twoja	twoje	twoi	twoje
Genitive	twojego	twojej	twojego	twoich	twoich
Dative	twojemu	twojej	twojemu	twoim	twoim
Accusative	twojego/twój	twoją	twoje	twoich	twoje
Instrumental	twoim	twoją	twoim	twoimi	twoimi
Locative	twoim	twojej	twoim	twoich	twoich

Declension of nasz
	masculine	feminine	neuter	virile plural	nonvirile plural
Nominative	nasz	nasza	nasze	nasi	nasze
Genitive	naszego	naszej	naszego	naszych	naszych
Dative	naszemu	naszej	naszemu	naszym	naszym
Accusative	naszego/nasz	naszą	nasze	naszych	nasze
Instrumental	naszym	naszą	naszym	naszymi	naszymi
Locative	naszym	naszej	naszym	naszych	naszych

Declension of wasz
	masculine	feminine	neuter	virile plural	nonvirile plural
Nominative	wasz	wasza	wasze	wasi	wasze
Genitive	waszego	waszej	waszego	waszych	waszych
Dative	waszemu	waszej	waszemu	waszym	waszym
Accusative	waszego/wasz	waszą	wasze	waszych	wasze
Instrumental	waszym	waszą	waszym	waszymi	waszymi
Locative	waszym	waszej	waszym	waszych	waszych

=== Demonstrative pronouns ===
The demonstrative pronouns ten (this) and tamten (that) are declined in a manner similar to adjectives. Their declensions are shown below.

Declension of ten
	Masculine	Feminine	Neuter	Virile Plural	Nonvirile Plural
Nominative	ten	ta	to	ci	te
Genitive	tego	tej	tego	tych	tych
Dative	temu	tej	temu	tym	tym
Accusative	tego/ten*	tę/tą**	to	tych	te
Instrumental	tym	tą	tym	tymi	tymi
Locative	tym	tej	tym	tych	tych

Declension of tamten
	Masculine	Feminine	Neuter	Virile Plural	Nonvirile Plural
Nominative	tamten	tamta	tamto	tamci	tamte
Genitive	tamtego	tamtej	tamtego	tamtych	tamtych
Dative	tamtemu	tamtej	tamtemu	tamtym	tamtym
Accusative	tamtego/tamten*	tamtą	tamto	tamtych	tamte
Instrumental	tamtym	tamtą	tamtym	tamtymi	tamtymi
Locative	tamtym	tamtej	tamtym	tamtych	tamtych

* Tego/Tamtego are used for the Masculine Animate declension and Ten/Tamten are used for the Masculine inanimate declension.

** tą is only used in informal speech, tę is the standard written form.

=== Interrogative pronouns ===
The declensions of "kto" and "co" are shown below.

Derived pronouns such as ktoś/coś, ktokolwiek/cokolwiek, and nikt/nic are declined similarly to kto and co, however nic has the unaltered (accusative) form instead of niczego when it is the object of a negated verb.

Declension of kogo and czego
Nom.	Gen.	Dat.	Acc.	Inst.	Loc.
kto	kogo	komu	kogo	kim	kim
co	czego	czemu	co	czym	czym

== Numbers and quantifiers ==
The declension of numerals is given below (accusative and vocative are equal to nominative unless stated). For information on formation and usage, see Numbers and quantifiers in the article on Polish grammar.

- 1 jeden like an adjective (feminine jedna etc., but neuter N/A jedno). The plural forms also exist (jedni/jedne etc.); they are used to mean "some", or to mean "one" with pluralia tantum (jedne drzwi "one door").
- 2 dwa (feminine N/A dwie, masc. personal N dwaj/dwóch A dwu/dwóch), G/L dwóch, D dwóm, I dwoma (fem. also dwiema)
- 3 trzy (masc. personal N trzej/trzech A trzech), G/L trzech, D trzem, I trzema
- 4 cztery (masc. personal N czterej/czterech A czterech), G/L czterech, D czterem, I czterema
- 5 pięć (masc. personal N/A pięciu), G/D/L pięciu, I pięcioma
- The same pattern as 5 is followed for the higher numbers sześć, siedem (siedmiu etc.), osiem (ośmiu etc.), dziewięć, dziesięć; jedenaście (jedenastu) etc.; dwadzieścia (dwudziestu etc.), trzydzieści (trzydziestu), czterdzieści (-stu), pięćdziesiąt (pięćdziesięciu) etc.; sto (stu etc.), dwieście (dwustu etc.), trzysta (trzystu etc.), czterysta (-stu); pięćset (pięciuset) etc. From 500 onwards (and optionally for the lower hundreds) the instrumental is the same as the G/D/L form.

Higher numbers (tysiąc, milion etc.) are declined as nouns, and their multiples are treated as number+noun combinations (dwa tysiące "two thousand" behaves like dwa miesiące "two months", and so on).

In compound numbers only the last part of the number is inflected, except when there are both tens and units, in which case both of those are inflected, and when jeden, which is indeclinable in all compound numbers, is the last part of the number, in which case the second to last part is inflected.

Collective numerals:

- dwoje, G dwojga, D/L dwojgu, I dwojgiem
- troje, G trojga, D/L trojgu, I trojgiem
- czworo, G czworga, D/L czworgu, I czworgiem. Similarly for pięcioro etc.

Quantifiers:

- kilka, G/D/L and masc. personal N/A kilku, I kilkoma. Similarly parę, (paru, paroma), wiele (wielu, wieloma), ile, tyle
- dużo, mało, trochę, pełno, więcej, mniej are invariant (so not often used in oblique cases if the meaning would be unclear)
- forms like kilkanaście, kilkadziesiąt, kilkaset behave like 15, 50, 500
- oba ("both") behaves like dwa (including feminine obie, masculine personal obaj/obu, collective oboje, etc.), but usually with obu where dwa has dwóch. The other word for "both", obydwa, inflects like dwa.

== Verbs ==
The lemma of a verb is the infinitive, which usually ends in -ć (occasionally -c). Examples for infinitives in Polish include "być", "czytać", and "brać".

If a verb includes a prefix, then it is generally conjugated like the unprefixed verb, although sometimes the prefix may change its form (e.g. z(e)+brać: infinitive zebrać, but present tense zbiorę etc.)

The present tense (or future tense of perfective verbs) may follow either of the following patterns:

- Pattern 1: -m (1st person singular), -sz (2nd singular), - (3rd singular); -my (1st plural), -cie (2nd plural), -ją (3rd plural). This is followed by many verbs in -ać, such as śpiewać ("sing"): śpiewam, śpiewasz, śpiewa etc. It is also followed by mieć ("have"): mam etc.; umieć ("know how to"; similarly rozumieć "understand"): umiem etc.; jeść ("eat", similarly with prefixes): jem etc., but 3P jedzą; wiedzieć ("know", similarly with prefixes e.g. powiedzieć "say"): wiem etc. but wiedzą; and dać ("give", similarly with prefixes): dam etc. but dadzą.

śpiewać conjugation (pattern 1 imperfective)
		Singular			Plural	
	Person	Masculine	Feminine	Neuter	Virile	Nonvirile
infinitive		śpiewać				
present tense	1st	śpiewam			śpiewamy	
present tense	2nd	śpiewasz			śpiewacie	
present tense	3rd	śpiewa			śpiewają	
present tense	impersonal	śpiewa się				
past tense	1st	śpiewałem	śpiewałam		śpiewaliśmy	śpiewałyśmy
past tense	2nd	śpiewałeś	śpiewałaś		śpiewaliście	śpiewałyście
past tense	3rd	śpiewał	śpiewała	śpiewało	śpiewali	śpiewały
past tense	impersonal	śpiewano				
future tense	1st	będę śpiewał, będę śpiewać	będę śpiewała, będę śpiewać		będziemy śpiewali, będziemy śpiewać	będziemy śpiewały, będziemy śpiewać
future tense	2nd	będziesz śpiewał, będziesz śpiewać	będziesz śpiewała, będziesz śpiewać		będziecie śpiewali, będziecie śpiewać	będziecie śpiewały, będziecie śpiewać
future tense	3rd	będzie śpiewał, będzie śpiewać	będzie śpiewała, będzie śpiewać	będzie śpiewało, będzie śpiewać	będą śpiewali, będą śpiewać	będą śpiewały, będą śpiewać
future tense	impersonal	będzie śpiewać się				
conditional	1st	śpiewałbym	śpiewałabym		śpiewalibyśmy	śpiewałybyśmy
conditional	2nd	śpiewałbyś	śpiewałabyś		śpiewalibyście	śpiewałybyście
conditional	3rd	śpiewałby	śpiewałaby	śpiewałoby	śpiewaliby	śpiewałyby
conditional	impersonal	śpiewano by				
imperative	1st	niech śpiewam			śpiewajmy	
imperative	2nd	śpiewaj			śpiewajcie	
imperative	3rd	niech śpiewa			niech śpiewają	
active adjectival participle		śpiewający	śpiewająca	śpiewające	śpiewający	śpiewające
passive adjectival participle		śpiewany	śpiewana	śpiewane	śpiewani	śpiewane
contemporary adverbial participle		śpiewając				
verbal noun		śpiewanie				

- Pattern 2: -ę (1st singular); -ą (3rd plural); other forms with the same endings as above, but possibly with a different form of the stem than for 1S and 3P. For example:
  - brać ("take"): biorę, bierzesz, bierze, bierzemy, bierzecie, biorą
  - kupić ("buy"): kupię, kupisz, kupi, kupimy, kupicie, kupią

brać conjugation (pattern 2 imperfective)
		Singular			Plural	
	Person	Masculine	Feminine	Neuter	Virile	Nonvirile
infinitive		brać				
present tense	1st	biorę			bierzemy	
present tense	2nd	bierzesz			bierzecie	
present tense	3rd	bierze			biorą	
present tense	impersonal	bierze się				
past tense	1st	brałem	brałam		braliśmy	brałyśmy
past tense	2nd	brałeś	brałaś		braliście	brałyście
past tense	3rd	brał	brała	brało	brali	brały
past tense	impersonal	brano				
future tense	1st	będę brał, będę brać	będę brała, będę brać		będziemy brali, będziemy brać	będziemy brały, będziemy brać
future tense	2nd	będziesz brał, będziesz brać	będziesz brała, będziesz brać		będziecie brali, będziecie brać	będziecie brały, będziecie brać
future tense	3rd	będzie brał, będzie brać	będzie brała, będzie brać	będzie brało, będzie brać	będą brali, będą brać	będą brały, będą brać
future tense	impersonal	będzie brać się				
conditional	1st	brałbym	brałabym		bralibyśmy	brałybyśmy
conditional	2nd	brałbyś	brałabyś		bralibyście	brałybyście
conditional	3rd	brałby	brałaby	brałoby	braliby	brałyby
conditional	impersonal	brano by				
imperative	1st	niech biorę			bierzmy	
imperative	2nd	bierz			bierzcie	
imperative	3rd	niech bierze			niech biorą	
active adjectival participle		biorący	biorąca	biorące	biorący	biorące
passive adjectival participle		brany	brana	brane	brani	brane
contemporary adverbial participle		biorąc				
verbal noun		branie				

The future tense of być ("be") also follows the above pattern: będę, będziesz, będzie, ..., będą However the present tense of być is irregular:

- jestem, jesteś, jest; jesteśmy, jesteście, są

być conjugation (irregular imperfective)
		Singular			Plural	
	Person	Masculine	Feminine	Neuter	Virile	Nonvirile
Infinitive		być				
present tense	1st	jestem			jesteśmy	
present tense	2nd	jesteś			jesteście	
present tense	3rd	jest			są	
past tense	1st	byłem	byłam		byliśmy	byłyśmy
past tense	2nd	byłeś	byłaś		byliście	byłyście
past tense	3rd	był	była	było	byli	były
future tense	1st	będę			będziemy	
future tense	2nd	będziesz			będziecie	
future tense	3rd	będzie			będą	
conditional	1st	byłbym	byłabym		bylibyśmy	byłybyśmy
conditional	2nd	byłbyś	byłabyś		bylibyście	byłybyście
conditional	3rd	byłby	byłaby	byłoby	byliby	byłyby
imperative	1st	niech będę			bądźmy	
imperative	2nd	bądź			bądźcie	
imperative	3rd	niech będzie			niech będą	
active adjectival participle		będący	będąca	będące	będący	będące
contemporary adverbial participle		będąc				
anterior adverbial participle		bywszy				
verbal noun		bycie				

The past tense of most verbs is formed by replacing the -ć of the infinitive with -ł for the masculine singular, -ła for feminine singular, -ło for neuter singular, -ły for feminine plural and -li for other plurals; then adding the endings -(e)m, -(e)ś, -, śmy, ście, - for 1S, 2S, 3S, 1P, 2P, 3P. (The -e- in the singular suffixes appears after a consonant but not after a vowel.) For example, from być:

- 1S byłem/byłam, 2S byłeś/byłaś, 3S był/była/było, 1P byliśmy/byłyśmy, 2P byliście/byłyście, 3P byli/były.

The personal past tense suffixes, which are reduced forms of the present tense of być, are clitics and can be detached from the verb to attach to another accented word earlier in the sentence.

Some verbs form their past stems differently:

- Verbs in -eć have past tense in -ał(-) (the a alternates with e, so the masculine personal plural is -eli(-)).
- Verbs in -ąć have an alternating vowel (ę in place of ą when the following ł is followed by a vowel), although the alternation does not apply before -em and -eś (zacząć "begin": zacząłem/zaczęłam etc.) The explanation for this is that ą shifts to ę only if it is the penultimate syllable of the verb, and in the original uncliticized verb zaczął, ą was part of the final syllable rather than the penultimate like in zaczęła.

zacząć conjugation (pattern 2 perfective with ą/ę alternation in forms with ł + Vowel)
		singular			plural	
	person	masculine	feminine	neuter	virile	nonvirile
infinitive		zacząć				
future tense	1st	zacznę			zaczniemy	
future tense	2nd	zaczniesz			zaczniecie	
future tense	3rd	zacznie			zaczną	
future tense	impersonal	zacznie się				
past tense	1st	zacząłem	zaczęłam		zaczęliśmy	zaczęłyśmy
past tense	2nd	zacząłeś	zaczęłaś		zaczęliście	zaczęłyście
past tense	3rd	zaczął	zaczęła	zaczęło	zaczęli	zaczęły
past tense	impersonal	zaczęto				
conditional	1st	zacząłbym	zaczęłabym		zaczęlibyśmy	zaczęłybyśmy
conditional	2nd	zacząłbyś	zaczęłabyś		zaczęlibyście	zaczęłybyście
conditional	3rd	zacząłby	zaczęłaby	zaczęłoby	zaczęliby	zaczęłyby
conditional	impersonal	zaczęto by				
imperative	1st	niech zacznę			zacznijmy	
imperative	2nd	zacznij			zacznijcie	
imperative	3rd	niech zacznie			niech zaczną	
passive adjectival participle		zaczęty	zaczęta	zaczęte	zaczęci	zaczęte
anterior adverbial participle		zacząwszy				
verbal noun		zaczęcie				

- Verbs in -c have a past stem ending with a consonant, related to the (1S/3P) present stem, e.g. móc "be able": 1S present mogę, past stem móg- (with alternating vowel, this time even before -em and -eś:, mogłem/mogłam,... , mógł/mogła/mogło etc.)

móc conjugation (type 2 verb with past stem based on 1S/3P present indicative)
		singular			plural	
	person	masculine	feminine	neuter	virile	nonvirile
infinitive		móc				
present tense	1st	mogę			możemy	
present tense	2nd	możesz			możecie	
present tense	3rd	może			mogą	
present tense	impersonal	może się				
past tense	1st	mogłem	mogłam		mogliśmy	mogłyśmy
past tense	2nd	mogłeś	mogłaś		mogliście	mogłyście
past tense	3rd	mógł	mogła	mogło	mogli	mogły
future tense	1st	będę mógł, będę móc	będę mogła, będę móc		będziemy mogli, będziemy móc	będziemy mogły, będziemy móc
future tense	2nd	będziesz mógł, będziesz móc	będziesz mogła, będziesz móc		będziecie mogli, będziecie móc	będziecie mogły, będziecie móc
future tense	3rd	będzie mógł, będzie móc	będzie mogła, będzie móc	będzie mogło, będzie móc	będą mogli, będą móc	będą mogły, będą móc
future tense	impersonal	będzie móc się				
conditional	1st	mógłbym	mogłabym		moglibyśmy	mogłybyśmy
conditional	2nd	mógłbyś	mogłabyś		moglibyście	mogłybyście
conditional	3rd	mógłby	mogłaby	mogłoby	mogliby	mogłyby
imperative	1st	—			—	
imperative	2nd	—			—	
imperative	3rd	—			—	
active adjectival participle		mogący	mogąca	mogące	mogący	mogące
contemporary adverbial participle		mogąc				

- Some other verbs also follow the above pattern, i.e. with a stem ending in a consonant. (Note that the ł is not pronounced when final and preceded by a consonant.) This includes most verbs in -ść and -źć, e.g. nieść ("carry"): niosłem...niósł...nieśli. The verb iść ("go") has the irregular past stem forms szedł/szła/szło, szli/szły (similarly for its compounds: pójść has poszedł/poszła etc.). znaleźć and related verbs have forms like znalazł, znaleźli.
- Some verbs in -nąć drop that ending in some or all of their past stems, sometimes optionally. For example, zniknąć ("disappear") has znikł(a) as alternatives to zniknął/zniknęła.

zniknąć conjugation (type 2 perfective with an optional disappearing -nąć syllable in the past tense)
		singular			plural	
	person	masculine	feminine	neuter	virile	nonvirile
infinitive		zniknąć				
future tense	1st	zniknę			znikniemy	
future tense	2nd	znikniesz			znikniecie	
future tense	3rd	zniknie			znikną	
future tense	impersonal	zniknie się				
past tense	1st	zniknąłem	zniknęłam		zniknęliśmy	zniknęłyśmy
past tense	2nd	zniknąłeś	zniknęłaś		zniknęliście	zniknęłyście
past tense	3rd	zniknął	zniknęła	zniknęło	zniknęli	zniknęły
past tense	impersonal	zniknięto				
conditional	1st	zniknąłbym	zniknęłabym		zniknęlibyśmy	zniknęłybyśmy
conditional	2nd	zniknąłbyś	zniknęłabyś		zniknęlibyście	zniknęłybyście
conditional	3rd	zniknąłby	zniknęłaby	zniknęłoby	zniknęliby	zniknęłyby
conditional	impersonal	zniknięto by				
imperative	1st	niech zniknę			zniknijmy	
imperative	2nd	zniknij			zniknijcie	
imperative	3rd	niech zniknie			niech znikną	
anterior adverbial participle		zniknąwszy				
verbal noun		zniknięcie				

The conditional (or subjunctive) is formed from the past tense plus by, the personal endings (if any) coming after the by. For example: byłbym/byłabym, byłbyś/byłabyś, byłby/byłaby/byłoby; bylibyśmy/byłybyśmy, bylibyście/byłybyście, byliby/byłyby. The endings (-by, -bym etc.) are detachable clitics, like the past tense personal endings as mentioned above.

The future tense of imperfective verbs (other than być) is formed using the future of być (będę etc.) together with the infinitive, or the past form (inflected for gender and number, but without any personal suffixes), of the verb in question. For example, the future of robić ("do, make") has such forms as będę robić/robił/robiła, będzicie robić/robili/robiły. The choice between infinitive and past form is usually a free one, but with modals governing another infinitive, the past form is used: będzie musiał odejść (not będzie musieć...) "he will have to leave".

The second personal singular imperative is formed from the present tense by dropping the ending (e.g. brać: 2/3S present bierze(sz), imperative bierz), adding -ij for pronounceability (e.g. zacząć, pres. zacznie(sz), imperative zacznij); or (if the present tense is in -a-) by adding -aj (e.g. śpiewać, pres. śpiewa(sz), imperative śpiewaj). Irregular examples include być: bądź, mieć: miej. Add -my and -cie for the 1P and 2P forms. To make third-person imperative sentences (including with the polite second-person pronouns pan etc.) the particle niech is used.

Other forms of the verb are:

- present adverbial participle (imperfective verbs only), formed from the 3P present tense by adding -c (e.g. śpiewać: śpiewając; być has będąc)
- present adjectival participle (imperfective verbs only), formed from the present adverbial participle by adding adjectival endings (e.g. śpiewać: śpiewający etc.)
- past active participle (perfective verbs only), formed from the past tense by replacing -ł with -wszy (or -łszy after a consonant), e.g. zabić: zabiwszy "having killed" (this form is invariant, i.e. it is an adverbial participle).
- passive participle (all transitive verbs), in -ny or -ty (conjugated as an adjective). The form used depends on the ending of the infinitive: -ać: -any; -eć: -any but with vowel alternation (i.e. masc. personal pl. -eni); -yć/-ić: -ony/-iony but with vowel alternation (-eni), or -yty/-ity in verbs with present tense in -yje/-ije, like myć "wash" and bić "beat"; -ąć: -ęty (but -nąć: -nięty). Verbs with past stem ending in a consonant form the participle from the (3S) present tense form, e.g. nieść "carry", pres. niosę,... niesie, past niósł, passive participle niesiony. Note also jeść: jedzony.
- subjectless past tense, formed as the past participle but with the ending -o (e.g. śpiewano "it was sung")
- verbal noun, also called the gerund, formed from the past participle with the ending -ie, e.g. śpiewanie (note vowel alternation, e.g. rozumieć: rozumiany: rozumienie). This is a neuter noun.

The modal verb powinien ("should") is conjugated in the present tense with adjective-type and personal endings, similar to the past tense of regular verbs(powinna/-o/-i/-y; powinienem/powinnam "I should" etc.) It has only one tense, although on rare occasions, past tense forms of "być" (byłem, byłeś, był, etc.) are added to show past meaning.

== Prepositions and prefixes ==
Before some consonant clusters, particularly clusters beginning with a sibilant (in the case of z) or with f/w (in the case of w), the prepositions z and w take the form ze and we, respectively; (e.g. we Wrocławiu "in Wrocław"). These forms are also used before the first-person singular pronouns in mn-; several other prepositions also have longer forms before these pronouns (przeze mnie, pode mną etc.), and these phrases are pronounced as single words, with the stress on the penultimate syllable (the -e).

When z is used as a prefix, it is spelt "s" if it is part of a voiceless consonant cluster. As preposition it is spelt z, even if it is pronounced /s/. The epenthesis of -e- also applies to the prefixes w-, z-/s-, and to all -w or -z/-s (roz- + znać = rozeznać).

== Word formation ==
Polish makes wide use of prefixes and suffixes in word formation. Some examples of this are:

- Addition of prefixes to make perfective forms of verbs or to modify the meaning. The prefixes used for this purpose are mostly identical to prepositions (although they also include roz-, and prze-, the latter corresponding to the preposition przez). The same prefixes are used for word formation with other parts of speech also.
- Formation of verbs from nouns using the suffix -ować (as in kolorować "to colour" from kolor "colour"; organizować "to organize", cf. organizacja "organization").
- Formation of adjectives from nouns using suffixes such as -owy, -ny, -ski and -i (as in koci "cat's" from kot "cat").
- Formation of nouns from adjectives, usually using the suffix -ość (to form feminine nouns).
- Formation of nouns from verbs, usually in -nie, sometimes -cie (see the section on Verbs above).
- Formation of nouns from other nouns or other stems, using such suffixes as -nik, -nica, -ec, etc. (with various meanings).
- Formation of diminutive forms of nouns, usually using the suffixes -ek/-ka/-ko (for the respective genders).
