= Wiktor Jassem =

Polish phonetician, philologist, and linguist

- Born: 11 June 1922; Kraków, Poland
- Died: 7 January 2016 (aged 93)
- Occupation: Phonetician
- Notable work: Fonetyka języka angielskiego

Wiktor Jassem (11 June 1922 – 7 January 2016) was a Polish phonetician, philologist, linguist, technical sciences professor, and honourable member of Polish Phonetic Association. He specialized in acoustic phonetics and conducted research on the production of sounds and the processes of understanding of the speech.

== Biography ==
Wiktor Jassem was born on 11 June 1922 in Kraków. During World War II he took part in underground education – as a student since he studied English and German languages, yet also as a professor of English language. He started his academic career at University of Wrocław in the lat 1940s, where he was a lecturer of English phonetics. In 1952, he moved out and began teaching at Adam Mickiewicz University in Poznań. In the years 1955-1992 he was the Head of Laboratory of Acoustic Phonetics at the Institute of Fundamental Technical Research, Polish Academy of Sciences. Until 1968, he also worked in the Faculty of Languages and Literatures (pol. Wydział Filologii) where, in 1966-68, he was the director of the Phonetics Department.

In 1968, during the Polish political crisis, he was suspended by the PZPR works council and then dismissed from the University for refusing to read the "anti-Zionist" letter in front of his students.

He then continued his work at Polish Academy of Sciences in Poznań, where in 1974, as part of the Institute of Fundamental Problems of Technology of the Faculty of Technical Sciences of the Polish Academy of Sciences, he created the Independent Laboratory of Acoustic Fonetics. In 1976, he rejoined the PZPR. In 1978, he received the title of professor of technical sciences.

In his life, he wrote over 200 academic publications, primarily in the area of acoustic phonetics and its applications, many of his works focused on Polish and English phonetics. For over 50 years, he was a member of the board of Permanent Council of International Phonetic Association.

=== Editorial boards ===
1951–1970 lə mɛ:trə fɔnetik.
1979–1984 The Phonetician, Honorary Vice President from 1984.
1985–2003 Phonetica.
1976 International Journal of Man Machine Studies.
1972–1977 Acoustics and Ultrasounds Library.

=== Participation in research programmes ===
1995–1998 Project Copernicus. 58: Onomastica: Multilanguage and pronunciation dictionary of names in central and Eastern Europe.
1997–2000 Cooperative Research in Information Technology 2 (CRIT2), ESPRIT No. 20288: Computer analysis and synthesis of suprasegmental structures in communication systems.

=== Polish programmes centrally financed ===
1979–1985 Interdisciplinary programme: Nervous system together with biocybernetics elements and systems. 1985–1990 Central programme of fundamental issues: System with artificial intelligence for robots and vehicles. 1997–2001 2 Science Committee Grants.

He died on 7 January 2016, at the age of 93. He is buried in the Junikowo Cemetery in Poznań.

== Personal life ==
He was the father of Krzysztof Jassem and Dorota Glowacka (née Jassem).

== Selected publications ==
- Jassem, W. Intonation of Colloquial English, Travaux de la Société des Sciences et des Lettres de Wroclaw, 1951
- Jassem, W. Fonetyka języka angielskiego, Warszawa : Państwowe Wydawnictwo Naukowe, 1954
- Jassem, W. Podręcznik wymowy angielskiej, Warszawa : Państwowe Wydawnictwo Naukowe, 1962
- Jassem, W. Podstawy fonetyki akustycznej (Bases of acoustic phonetics), Warszawa: Panstwowe Wydawnictwo Naukowe, 1973.
- Jassem, W. and F. J. Nolan Sounds and Languages, In G. Bristow, ed. Electronic Speech Synthesis. London: Granada, 19–47, 1984.
- The Phonology of Modern English, Warszawa : Państwowe Wydawnictwo Naukowe, 1983, 1987
- Jassem, W. 1992. The phoneme and the acoustical speech signal. In W. Ainsworth (Ed.) Advances in Speech, Hearing and Language Processing, vol. 2. London: JAI Press Ltd. 1–16
- Exercises in English Pronunciation, Warszawa : Państwowe Wydawnictwo Naukowe, 1995
- Jassem, W., M. Krzyśko and W. Wołyński. Normalization of Polish vowel spectra. In The Phonetician 81, 23–31, 2000.
- Jassem, W., M. Krzyśko and W. Wołyński. Reduction of speaker-related variability in Polish vowel spectra. In Journal of the International Phonetic Association 31/2, 187–202, 2001.
- Jassem, W. Classification and organization of data in intonation research. In A. Braun and R. Masthoff eds. Phonetics and its applications. Festschrift for Jens-Peter Köster on the Occasion of his 60th Birthday. Wiesbaden, Stuttgart: Franz Steinet Verlag. 289–297, 2002.
- Jassem, W. Illustrations of the IPA: Polish. Journal of the International Phonetic Association, Journal of the International Phonetic Association (JIPA), 33(1), 103-107, 2003.
- Jassem, W. and W. Grygiel Off-line classification of Polish vowel spectra using artificial neural networks. In Journal of the International Phonetic Association 34/1, 37–52, 2004.
