= Polish phonology =

Sounds and pronunciation of the Polish language

The phonological system of the Polish language is similar in many ways to those of other Slavic languages, although there are some characteristic features found in only a few other languages of the family, such as contrasting postalveolar and alveolo-palatal fricatives and affricates. The vowel system is relatively simple, with just six oral monophthongs and two nasals in traditional speech, while the consonant system is much more complex.

== Vowels ==
Polish oral vowels depicted on a vowel diagram, from Rocławski (1976:75). Main allophones (in black) are in broad transcription, and positional allophones (in red and green) are in narrow transcription. Positional variants (in red) appear in palatal contexts.

The Polish vowel system consists of six oral sounds. Traditionally, it was also said to include two nasal monophthongs, with Polish considered the last Slavic language that had preserved nasal sounds that existed in Proto-Slavic. However, recent sources present for modern Polish a vowel system without nasal vowel phonemes, including only the aforementioned six oral vowels.

Oral vowels
	Front	Central	Back
Close	i	ɨ (Note: /ɨ/ is also less commonly transcribed /ɪ/, such as by the PWN-Oxford Polish-English.)	u
Mid	ɛ (Note: /ɛ ɔ ɛ̃ ɔ̃/ are also less commonly transcribed /e o ẽ õ/ respectively, e.g. by the PWN-Oxford Polish-English and by Jassem (2003:105).)		ɔ
Open		a (Note: /a/ is sometimes transcribed /ɑ/ e.g. Sawicka (1995:118), Wiśniewski (2007:24))	

Nasal vowels
	Front	Back
Mid	(ɛ̃ (Note: Most sources present a vowel system without nasal vowel phonemes (see the sub-section Phonological status below).))	(ɔ̃)

=== Oral ===
==== Close ====
- /i/ is close front unrounded [i]. It is somewhat more open than cardinal [i].
- /ɨ/ ranges from almost close-mid near-front [ɪ̞] to (advanced) close-mid central [ɘ̟] or alternatively from near-close near-front unrounded [ɪ] to close-mid central unrounded [ɘ]. These descriptions are essentially equivalent. Traditionally, [ɨ] is used in narrow transcriptions (as if close central unrounded). Older sources describe this vowel as follows:
  - According to Jassem (1971:234), it is intermediate between cardinal [e] and [ɨ], but closer to the latter one. Alternatively, it is intermediate between cardinal [e] and [ɤ], but closer to the former. He places it on a vowel chart closer to [ɪ].
  - According to Wierzchowska (1971:125,130) it is articulated with the centre of the tongue raised up and moved somewhat forward; the pharynx also widens. She places it on a vowel chart closer to [ɘ].
  - According to Rocławski (1976:75,105), it is near-close central unrounded [ɪ̠], with a close-mid central unrounded [ɘ̟] allophone being optional before /r/ and in some unstressed positions. A realization close to near-close near front unrounded [ɪ] is present in northeastern dialects.
- /u/ is close back rounded [u]. It is somewhat more open than cardinal [u], [ɯ] and intermediate between them in terms of labialization.
  - There is no complete agreement about the realization of /u/ between soft consonants:
    - According to Wiśniewski (2007:72), it is close back somewhat fronted [u̟].
    - According to Sawicka (1995:123), it is close central [ʉ].
    - According to Rocławski (1976:116), it is close centralized [ü].

==== Mid ====
- /ɛ/ is open-mid front unrounded [ɛ]. It is somewhat more open than cardinal [ɛ].
  - There is no complete agreement about the realization of /ɛ/ between soft consonants:
    - According to Jassem (2003:105), Sawicka (1995:122) and Wiśniewski (2007:71), it is close-mid front unrounded [e].
    - According to Rocławski (1976:108), it is either mid front unrounded [ɛ̝] or mid retracted front unrounded [ɛ̠].
    - According to the British phonetician John C. Wells, it is often noticeably centralized [ɛ̈]: somewhat closer to a central vowel [ɜ] in palatal contexts.
- /ɔ/ is open-mid back. It is somewhat more open than cardinal [ɔ], [ʌ] and intermediate between them in terms of labialization.
  - There is no complete agreement about the rounding of /ɔ/:
    - According to Rocławski (1976:113), it is usually somewhat rounded [ɔ̜], but sometimes, it is pronounced with neutral lips [ʌ]. In the latter case, the lack of rounding is compensated for by a stronger retraction of the tongue.
    - According to Sawicka (1995:119), citing Wierzchowska (1967:109), it is unrounded [ʌ].
    - According to Gussmann (2007:2), it is simply "rounded" [ɔ].
  - There is no complete agreement about the realization of /ɔ/ between soft consonants:
    - According to Rocławski (1976:113), it can be any of the following: open-mid centralized back rounded [ɔ̈], raised open-mid back rounded [ɔ̝] or mid advanced back rounded [ɔ̟]
    - According to Wiśniewski (2001:72), it is close-mid advanced back rounded [o̟].
    - According to Sawicka (1995:122), it is close-mid central rounded vowel [ɵ].
  - According to Wiśniewski (2001:72), a close-mid back [o] is a free variant before [w].

==== Open ====
- /a/ is open central unrounded [ä]. According to most sources, it is intermediate between cardinal [a] and [ɑ]. However, Gussmann (2007) describes it broadly as open front unrounded [a]. Traditionally, [a] is used even in otherwise narrow transcriptions.
  - There is no complete agreement about the realization of /a/ between soft consonants:
    - According to Jassem (2003:106), it is open front unrounded [a].
    - According to Sawicka (1995:122), it is open front unrounded [a] or even near-open front unrounded [æ]. She uses [ɑ] for the main central allophone.
    - According to Wiśniewski (2001:70), it is near-open central unrounded [ɐ].
    - According to Rocławski (1976:110), it is near-open near-front unrounded [æ̞̈].

==== Distribution ====
Positional allophones in (alveolo-)palatal contexts
Phoneme	Typical Spelling	Phonemic position	Allophone
/ɨ/	y	Cɨ(C)	[ɨ]
/ɨ/	y	CɨÇ	[ɨ]
/i/	i	(Ç)i(C)	[i]
/i/	i	(Ç)iÇ	[i]
/ɛ/	e, ę*	(C)ɛ(C)	[ɛ]
/ɛ/	e, ę*	(C)ɛÇ	[ɛ]
/ɛ/	ie, je ię*, ję*	Çɛ(C)	[ɛ], [e]
/ɛ/	ie, je ię*, ję*	ÇɛÇ	[e]
/a/	a	(C)a(C)	[a]
/a/	a	CaÇ	[a]
/a/	ia, ja	Ça(C)	[a], [æ̞]
/a/	ia, ja	ÇaÇ	[æ̞]
/ɔ/	o, ą*	(C)ɔ(C)	[ɔ]
/ɔ/	o, ą*	(C)ɔÇ	[ɔ]
/ɔ/	io, jo ią*, ją*	Çɔ(C)	[ɔ], [ɵ]
/ɔ/	io, jo ią*, ją*	ÇɔÇ	[ɵ]
/u/	u, ó	Cu(C)	[u]
/u/	u, ó	CuÇ	[u]
/u/	iu, ju ió, jó	Çu(C)	[u], [ʉ]
/u/	iu, ju ió, jó	ÇuÇ	[ʉ]
"C" represents a non-(alveolo)-palatal consonant only. "(C)" represents a non-(alveolo)-palatal consonant, a vowel, utterance boundary. "Ç" represents an alveolo-palatal consonant /ɲ, ɕ, ʑ, t͡ɕ, d͡ʑ/ or /j/. ę*, ą* represent /ɛ, ɔ/ followed by /m, n, ɲ, ŋ/

The vowels /ɨ/ and /i/ are largely in complementary distribution. Either vowel may follow a labial consonant, as in mi ('to me') and my ('we'). Elsewhere, however, /i/ is usually restricted to word-initial position and positions after alveolo-palatal consonants and approximants /l, j/, while /ɨ/ cannot appear in those positions (see § Hard and soft consonants below). Either vowel may follow a velar fricative /x/ but after velar /k, ɡ/ the vowel /ɨ/ is limited to rare loanwords e.g. kynologia /ˌkɨnɔˈlɔɡja/ ('cynology') and gyros /ˈɡɨrɔs/ ('gyro'). Dental, postalveolar consonants and approximants /r, w/ are followed by /ɨ/ in native or assimilated words. However, /i/ appears outside its usual positions in some foreign-derived words, as in chipsy /ˈt͡ʂipsɨ/ ('potato chips') and tir /tir/ ('large lorry', see TIR). The degree of palatalization in these contexts is weak. In some phonological descriptions of Polish that make a phonemic distinction between palatalized and unpalatalized consonants, [ɨ] and [i] may thus be treated as allophones of a single phoneme. In the past, /ɨ/ was closer to [ɪ], which is acoustically more similar to [i].

=== Nasal ===
Nasal vowels do not feature uniform nasality over their duration. Phonetically, they consist of an oral vowel followed by a nasal semivowel [w̃] or [j̃] (są is pronounced [sɔw̃], which sounds closer to Portuguese são [sɐ̃w̃] than French sont [sɔ̃] – all three words mean '(they) are'). Therefore, they are phonetically diphthongs. (For nasality following other vowel nuclei, see § Allophony below.)

==== Phonological status ====
The nasal phonemes /ɔ̃, ɛ̃/ appear in older phonological descriptions of Polish e.g. Stieber (1966), Rocławski (1976:84), Wierzchowska (1980:51). In more recent descriptions the orthographic nasal vowels ą, ę are analyzed as two phonemes in all contexts e.g. Sawicka (1995), Wiśniewski (2007). Before a fricative and in word-final position (in the case of ą) they are transcribed as an oral vowel /ɔ, ɛ/ followed by a nasal consonant /ɲ, ŋ/ or [j̃, w̃]. Under such an analysis, the list of consonantal phonemes is extended by a velar nasal phoneme /ŋ/ or by two nasalized approximants /j̃/, /w̃/.

==== Distribution ====
If analyzed as separate phonemes, nasal vowels do not occur except before a fricative and in word-final position. When the letters ą and ę appear before stops and affricates, they indicate an oral /ɔ/ or /ɛ/ followed by a nasal consonant homorganic with the following consonant. For example, kąt ('angle', 'corner') is /kɔnt/, gęba ('mouth') is /ˈɡɛmba/, pięć ('five') is /pjɛɲt͡ɕ/ and bąk ('bumble bee') is /bɔŋk/, as if they were spelled *kont, *gemba, *pieńć and *bonk. Before /l/ or /w/, nasality is lost altogether, and ą and ę are pronounced as oral /ɔ/ or /ɛ/. The /ɛŋ/ sequence is also denasalized to /ɛ/ in word-final position, as in będę /ˈbɛndɛ/ 'I will be'.

Polish vowels
IPA	Polish script	Example
/i/	i	miś /miɕ/ ('teddy bear')
/ɛ/	e	ten /tɛn/ ('this one')
/ɨ/	y	mysz /mɨʂ/ ('mouse')
/a/	a	ptak /ptak/ ('bird')
/u/	u/ó	bum /bum/ ('boom')
/ɔ/	o	kot /kɔt/ ('cat')
/ɛŋ/ (or /ɛ̃/)	ę	węże /vɛŋʐɛ/ ('snakes')
/ɔŋ/ (or /ɔ̃/)	ą	wąż /vɔŋʂ/ ('snake')
/ɛɲ/ (or /ɛ̃/)	ę	gęś /ɡɛɲɕ/ ('goose')
/ɔɲ/ (or /ɔ̃/)	ą	gąsior /ɡɔɲɕɔr/ ('gander')

=== Historical development ===
Distinctive vowel length was inherited from late Proto-Slavic, although in Polish only some pretonic long vowels and vowels with the neoacute retained length. Additional vowel lengths were introduced in Proto-Polish (as in other West Slavic languages) as a result of compensatory lengthening when a yer in the next syllable disappeared according to Havlík's law. In Polish this only happened in penultimate syllables (which thus became final syllables) before a voiced consonant (in other Slavic languages where a similar process occurred this could be more general).

The resultant system of vowel lengths was similar to what is today preserved in Czech and to a lesser degree in Slovak, although the distribution of the sounds often differed (for example in Czech the old acute also lengthened vowels). In the emerging modern Polish, however, the long vowels were shortened again but sometimes (depending on dialect) with a change in quality (the vowels tended to become higher). The latter changes came to be incorporated into the standard language only in the case of long o and the long nasal vowel. The vowel shift may thus be presented as follows:

- long oral /aː/ > short oral /a/ (certain dialects: /ɒ/, /ɔ/)
- long oral /eː/ > short oral /ɛ/ (certain dialects: /e/, /ɨ/ or /i/)
- long oral /ɨː/ or /iː/ > short oral /ɨ/ or /i/
- long oral /oː/ > short oral /u/ (certain dialects: /o/), written ó
- long oral /uː/ > short oral /u/, written u
- long nasal /ãː/ > short nasal /ɔ̃/, written ą

The /u/ that was once a long /oː/ is still distinguished in script as ó, except in some words which were later respelled, such as bruzda, dłuto, pruć (instead of etymological brózda, dłóto, próć).

In most circumstances, consonants were palatalized when followed by an original front vowel, including the soft yer (ь) that was often later lost. For example: *dьnь became dzień ('day'), while *dьnьmъ became dniem ('day' instr.).

Nasal vowels *ę and *ǫ of late Proto-Slavic merged (*ę leaving a trace by palatalizing the preceding consonant) to become the medieval Polish vowel /ã/, written ø. Like other Polish vowels, it developed long and short variants. The short variant developed into present-day /ɛ̃/ ę, while the long form became /ɔ̃/, written ą, as described above. Overall:

- Proto-Slavic *ę > ię when short, ią when long (where the i represents palatalization of the preceding consonant)
- Proto-Slavic *ǫ > ę when short, ą when long

The historical shifts are the reason for the alternations o:ó and ę:ą commonly encountered in Polish morphology: *rogъ ('horn') became róg due to the loss of the following yer (originally pronounced with a long o, now with /u/), and the instrumental case of the same word went from *rogъmъ to rogiem (with no lengthening of the o). Similarly, *dǫbъ ('oak') became dąb (originally with the long form of the nasal vowel), and in the instrumental case, *dǫbъmъ the vowel remained short, causing the modern dębem.

=== Dialectal variation ===
Polish dialects differ particularly in their realization of nasal vowels, both in terms of whether and when they are decomposed to an oral vowel followed by a nasal consonant and in terms of the quality of the vowels used.

Also, some dialects preserve nonstandard developments of historical long vowels (see previous section); for example, a may be pronounced with [ɔ] in words in which it was historically long.

== Consonants ==
The Polish consonant system is more complicated; its characteristic features include the series of affricates and palatal consonants that resulted from four Proto-Slavic palatalizations and two further palatalizations that took place in Polish and Belarusian.

=== Phonemes ===
The consonant phonemes of Polish are as follows:

		Labial	Dental/ alveolar	Post- alveolar	(Alveolo-) palatal	Velar	
		Labial	Dental/ alveolar	Post- alveolar	(Alveolo-) palatal	plain	palatalized
Nasal		m	n		ɲ	ŋ (Note: Most recent sources present a consonant system with a phonemic /ŋ/ and without nasal vowel phonemes /ɛ̃/ and /ɔ̃/.(See § Phonological status above).)	
Plosive	voiceless	p	t			k	(kʲ) (Note: The phonemes /kʲ/, /ɡʲ/ and /xʲ/ are alternatively transcribed as /c/, /ɟ/ and /ç/ (as if they were palatal consonants). They are not always considered phonemic. (See § Phonological status of palatalized consonants below.))
Plosive	voiced	b	d			ɡ	(ɡʲ)
Affricate	voiceless		t͡s	t͡ʂ (Note: The postalveolar consonants /ʂ/, /ʐ/, /t͡ʂ/ and /d͡ʐ/ are alternatively transcribed as /ʃ/, /ʒ/, /t͡ʃ/ and /d͡ʒ/.)	t͡ɕ		
Affricate	voiced		d͡z	d͡ʐ	d͡ʑ		
Fricative	voiceless	f	s	ʂ	ɕ	x	(xʲ)
Fricative	voiced	v	z	ʐ	ʑ	(ɣ) (Note: dialectally for ⟨h⟩; see § Dialectal variation.)	(ɣʲ)
Vibrant			r (Note: The /r/ phoneme is alternatively transcribed /ɾ/.)				
Approximant			l		j	w	

Polish consonants
IPA	Polish script	Example	IPA	Polish script	Example
/m/	m	masa /masa/ ('mass')	/ɲ/	ń/n(i)	koń /kɔɲ/ ('horse')
/b/	b	bas /bas/ ('bass')	/ʑ/	ź/z(i)	źrebię /ʑrɛbjɛ/ ('foal')
/p/	p	pas /pas/ ('belt')	/ɕ/	ś/s(i)	śruba /ɕruba/ ('screw')
/v/	w	wór /vur/ ('bag')	/d͡ʑ/	dź/dz(i)	dźwięk /d͡ʑvjɛŋk/ ('sound')
/f/	f	futro /futrɔ/ ('fur')	/t͡ɕ/	ć/c(i)	ćma /t͡ɕma/ ('moth')
/n/	n	noga /nɔɡa/ ('leg')	/ʐ/	ż/rz	żona /ʐɔna/ ('wife')
/d/	d	dom /dɔm/ ('home')	/ʂ/	sz	szum /ʂum/ ('rustle')
/t/	t	tom /tɔm/ ('volume')	/d͡ʐ/	dż	dżem /d͡ʐɛm/ ('jam')
/z/	z	zero /zɛrɔ/ ('zero')	/t͡ʂ/	cz	czas /t͡ʂas/ ('time')
/s/	s	sum /sum/ ('catfish')	/ŋ/	n(k)/n(g)	bank /baŋk/ ('bank') gong /ɡɔŋk/ ('gong')
/d͡z/	dz	dzwon /d͡zvɔn/ ('bell')	/ɡ/	g	gmin /ɡmin/ ('populace')
/t͡s/	c	co /t͡sɔ/ ('what')	/k/	k	kmin /kmin/ ('cumin')
/r/	r	rok /rɔk/ ('year')	/x/	h/ch	hak /xak/ ('hook') chór /xur/ ('choir')
/l/	l	liść /liɕt͡ɕ/ ('leaf')	(/ɡʲ/)	g(i)	giełda /ɡjɛwda/ (or /ɡʲɛwda/) ('marketplace') filologia /filɔlɔɡja/ (or /filɔlɔɡʲja/) ('philology')
/j/	j	jutro /jutrɔ/ ('tomorrow')	(/kʲ/)	k(i)	kiedy /kjɛdɨ/ (or /kʲɛdɨ/) ('when') kiosk /kjɔsk/ (or /kʲjɔsk/) ('kiosk')
/w/	ł	łaska /waska/ ('grace')	(/xʲ/)	h(i)/ch(i)	hieroglif /xjɛrɔɡlif/ (or /xʲjɛrɔɡlif/, /xʲɛrɔɡlif/) ('hieroglyph') monarchia /mɔnarxja/ (or /mɔnarxʲja/) ('monarchy')

The tongue shape of the postalveolar sounds is similar to the shape postalveolar approximant [ɹ̠] (one of the realizations of the English /r/ phoneme, see also Pronunciation of English /r/). The alveolo-palatals are pronounced with the body of the tongue raised to the hard palate but a greater area of the front of the tongue is raised close to the hard palate compared to the English palato-alveolar sounds. The series are known as "rustling" (szeleszczące) and "soughing" (szumiące) respectively; the equivalent alveolar series (⟨s, z, c, dz⟩) is called "hissing" (syczące).

Polish contrasts affricates and stop–fricative clusters by the fricative components being consistently longer in clusters than in affricates. Stops in clusters may have either a plosive release accompanied by a weak aspiration or a fricated release (as in an affricate) depending on the rate of speech and individual speech habits.

- czysta [ˈt͡ʂɨsta] ('clean' fem.) vs. trzysta [ˈt̺ʰʂˑɨsta] or [ˈt̺ʂˑɨsta] ('three hundred').
- dżem [ˈd͡ʐɛm] ('jam') with vs. drzem [d̺ʱʐˑɛm] or [ˈd̺ʐˑɛm] ('take a nap' imper. sing.).

Both realizations of stop-fricative clusters are considered correct and typically respelled as tsz, d-ż and czsz, dżż respectively in normative descriptions of Polish pronunciation. The distinction is lost in colloquial pronunciation in south-eastern Poland both being realized as simple affricates as in some Lesser Polish dialects. According to Sawicka (1995:150), Dunaj (2006:170), such a simplification is allowed in the standard language variety only before another consonant or before a juncture, e.g. trzmiel /tʂmjɛl/ or /t͡ʂmjɛl/ ('bumblebee'), patrz /patʂ/ or /pat͡ʂ/ ('look', imper. sing.).

For the possibility of an additional velar fricative /ɣ/ for ⟨h⟩, see § Dialectal variation below. On the same grounds as for /xʲ/ Sawicka (1995:146) gives /ɣʲ/ a phonemic status for speakers who have /ɣ/ in their system.

=== Allophones ===
- /m, p, b, f, v/ are palatalized [mʲ, pʲ, bʲ, fʲ, vʲ] before /i, j/.
- /m, n/ have a labiodental allophone [ɱ], which occurs before labiodental consonants (as in symfonia 'symphony' or konfiguracja 'configuration'). Before fricatives, orthographic nasal consonants m, n may be realized as nasal approximants [w̃ j̃], analogous to /ŋ, ɲ/ below. This occurs in loanwords, and in free variation with the typical consonantal pronunciation (e.g. instynkt [ˈiw̃stɨŋkt⁓ˈinstɨŋkt] 'instinct').
- /n, t, d, t͡s, d͡z, s, z/ are denti-alveolar [n̪, t̪, d̪, t̪͡s̪, d̪͡z̪, s̪, z̪] except before /i, j/ and postalveolar consonants. They are pronounced with the tip of the tongue very close or touching to the upper front teeth and partially the front of the alveolar ridge. In western and northern Poland, [n̪] is maintained in native words across a morpheme boundary in nk, e.g. sionka ('a small hallway') [ˈɕɔn̪ka] contrasts with siąka ('((s)he sniffs') [ˈɕɔŋka]. In other parts of Poland, the contrast is neutralized towards /ŋ/, i.e. [ˈɕɔŋka] is used for both. In foreign words ⟨nk, ng⟩ represent /ŋk, ŋɡ/.
- /t, d, t͡s, d͡z, s, z/ are palatalized laminal alveolar [t̻ʲ, d̻ʲ, t̻͡s̻ʲ, d̻͡z̻ʲ, s̻ʲ, z̻ʲ] before /i, j/ in recent borrowings. They are pronounced with the blade of the tongue very close or touching the alveolar ridge.
- /t, d/ are apical alveolar [t̺, d̺] before apical postalveolar /t͡ʂ, d͡ʐ, ʂ, ʐ/ while /n/ is apical alveolar [n̺] before /t͡ʂ, d͡ʐ, ʂ, ʐ/.
- /t, d/ can be assimilated to affricates /ts, dz/ before /ts, dz, s, z/, /t͡ʂ, d͡ʐ/ before /t͡ʂ, d͡ʐ, ʂ, ʐ/ and /t͡ɕ, d͡ʑ/ before /t͡ɕ, d͡ʑ, ɕ, ʑ/.
- /t͡s, d͡z, s, z/ can be assimilated to /t͡ʂ, d͡ʐ, ʂ, ʐ/ before /t͡ʂ, d͡ʐ, ʂ, ʐ/ and to /t͡ɕ, d͡ʑ, ɕ, ʑ/ before /t͡ɕ, d͡ʑ, ɕ, ʑ/.
- /t͡ʂ, d͡ʐ, ʂ, ʐ/ are variously described as apical postalveolar [t̺͡ʃ̺, d̺͡ʒ̺, ʃ̺, ʒ̺] or as (laminal) flat postalveolar. They are articulated with a flat, retracted tongue body, the tongue tip being raised and the entire blade moved up and back behind the corner of the alveolar ridge. A recent study shows that /ʂ, ʐ/ and the release of /t͡ʂ, d͡ʐ/ are predominantly alveolar, while the place of articulation of the stop in /t͡ʂ, d͡ʐ/ varies between alveolar and postalveolar. This agrees with characterizations of /t͡ʂ, d͡ʐ, ʂ, ʐ/ as alveolar in older sources. They may be described as retroflex [t͡ʂ, d͡ʐ, ʂ, ʐ] to indicate that they are not palatalized laminal postalveolar [t̻͡ʃ̻, d̻͡ʒ̻, ʃ̻, ʒ̻]. Strictly speaking, this is at odds with the narrower definition of retroflex consonants as subapical, in which the tongue curls back and its underside becomes the active articulator. Occasionally, [t͡ᶘ, d͡ᶚ, ᶘ, ᶚ] were used in a similar vein.
- /t͡ʂ, d͡ʐ, ʂ, ʐ/ become palatalized laminal postalveolar [t̻͡ʃ̻, d̻͡ʒ̻, ʃ̻, ʒ̻] before /i, j/ in recent loanwords.
- /ɲ, t͡ɕ, d͡ʑ, ɕ, ʑ/ are alveolo-palatal [ɲ̟, t͡ɕ, d͡ʑ, ɕ, ʑ]. They are articulated with the blade of the tongue behind the alveolar ridge and the body of the tongue raised toward the palate. Before fricatives, /ɲ/ is usually realized as a nasalized palatal approximant [j̃], for example, państwo ('state/country') [paj̃stfo], Gdańsk [ɡdaj̃sk].
- /ŋ, k, ɡ/ are velar [ŋ, k, ɡ]. Before fricatives and word-finally, /ŋ/ is realized as nasalized velar approximant [w̃]. According to Sawicka (1995:127–128, 136), this allophone is non-labialized [ɰ̃].
- /x/ is primarily velar [x]; it has the strongest friction before consonants [x̝], weaker friction before vowels [x̞] and weakest friction intervocalically, where it may be realized as glottal [h] (this variant "may appear to be voiced"). /x/ has a voiced allophone [ɣ], which occurs whenever /x/ is followed by a voiced obstruent (even across a word boundary), in accordance with the rules given under § Voicing and devoicing below. For example, klechda 'legend, myth' is [ˈklɛɣda], dach ('roof') is [ˈdax], but dach domu ('roof of the house') is [daɣ ˈdɔmu].
- /k, ɡ, x/ before /i, j/ are postpalatal [c̠, ɟ̠, ç̠]. If /kʲ, ɡʲ, xʲ/ are acknowledged as phonemes they are [c̠, ɟ̠ ç̠] as well, but their distribution is limited to contexts before /i, ɛ, j/. A postpalatal allophone [ɲ̠] of /ŋ/ appears only in front of [c̠, ɟ̠].
- /l/ is apical alveolar [l̺] and becomes denti-alveolar [l̪] before a following denti-alveolar consonant /n, t, d, t͡s, d͡z, s, z/. A palatalized laminal [l̻ʲ] or alveopalatal [ʎ̟] is used before /i, j/.
- /r/ is apical alveolar. It has been traditionally classified as a trill [r̺], with a tap [ɾ̺] supposedly only occurring as an allophone or in fast speech. However, more recent studies show that /r/ is predominantly realized as a tap [ɾ̺], sometimes as an approximant or a fricative, but almost never as a trill. One study found that in an intervocalic context a trilled [r] occurs in less than 3% of cases, while a tapped [ɾ] occurred in approximately 95% of cases. Another study by the same researcher showed that in a postconsonantal position, /r/ is realized as a tapped [ɾ] in 80–90% of cases, while trilled [r] occurs in just 1.5% of articulations. A palatalized laminal tap [ɾ̻ʲ] is used before /i, j/ in recent loanwords.
- /j/ is a palatal approximant [j]. According to Rocławski (1976:123), /j/ is reduced and very short [i̯] after consonants before vowels, for example miasto ('city') [ˈmʲi̯astɔ], piasek ('sand') [ˈpʲi̯asɛk].
- /w/ is a velar approximant [w]. According to Wierzchowska (1976:123), /w/ is most commonly non-labialized [w̜]; a labialization being typical only before /u/. A palatalized allophone [w̟/ɥ̠] before /i/ is given by Sawicka (1995:128).
- The approximants /j, w/ may be regarded as non-syllabic vowels when they are not followed by a vowel. For example, raj ('paradise') [ɾai̯], dał ('he gave') [dau̯], autor ('author') [ˈau̯tɔɾ].
- /m, n, ŋ, ɲ, l, r, w/ are regularly devoiced [m̥, n̥, ŋ̊, ɲ̊, l̥, ɾ̥, w̥] after a voiceless obstruent and optionally after a voiced obstruent which was devoiced. For example, wiatr ('wind') is pronounced [vjatɾ̥], while kadr ('a frame") can be pronounced [katɾ̥] or [kadɾ]. (See § Voicing and devoicing below.)

=== Distribution ===
Polish, like other Slavic languages, permits complex consonant clusters, which often arose from the disappearance of yers (see § Historical development above). Polish can have word-initial and word-medial clusters of up to four consonants, whereas word-final clusters can have up to five consonants. Examples of such clusters can be found in words such as bezwzględny /bɛzˈvzɡlɛndnɨ/ ('unconditional' or 'heartless', 'ruthless'), źdźbło /ˈʑd͡ʑbwɔ/ ('blade of grass'), wstrząs /ˈfstʂɔŋs/ ('shock'), and krnąbrność /ˈkrnɔmbrnɔɕt͡ɕ/ ('disobedience'). A popular Polish tongue-twister (from a verse by Jan Brzechwa) is W Szczebrzeszynie chrząszcz brzmi w trzcinie /fʂt͡ʂɛbʐɛˈʂɨɲɛ xʂɔŋʂt͡ʂ bʐmi ˈftʂt͡ɕiɲɛ/ ('In Szczebrzeszyn a beetle buzzes in the reeds').

For the restrictions on combinations of voiced and voiceless consonants in clusters, see § Voicing and devoicing below. Unlike languages such as Czech, Polish does not have syllabic consonants: the nucleus of a syllable is always a vowel.

The consonant /j/ is restricted to positions adjacent to a vowel. It also cannot precede y. (For other restrictions on consonants appearing before i or y, see § Distribution above.)

=== Voicing and devoicing ===
Voicing of final obstruents
Position		Example	Sandhi	
Final	Initial	Example	Voicing pronunciation	Devoicing pronunciation
Word final obstruent or obstruent + /m, n, l, r, j, w/	Sonorant: /m, n, ɲ, l, r, j, w, i, ɨ, ɛ, a, ɔ, u/	kot rudy ('a ginger cat') dług mały ('a small debt') kot łaciaty ('a speckled cat') dług Łukasza ('Luke's debt') kot Ewy ('Eve's cat') mąż Ewy ('Eve's husband')	[kɔd‿ɾudɨ] [dwuɡ‿mawɨ] [kɔd‿wat͡ɕatɨ] [dwuɡ‿wukaʂa] [kɔd‿ɛvɨ] [mɔw̃ʐ‿ɛvɨ]	[kɔt‿ɾudɨ] [dwuk‿mawɨ] [kɔt‿wat͡ɕatɨ] [dwuk‿wukaʂa] [kɔt‿ɛvɨ] [mɔw̃ʂ‿ɛvɨ]
Word final obstruent or obstruent + /m, n, l, r, j, w/	Voiceless obstruent: /p, f, t, t͡s, s, t͡ʂ, ʂ, t͡ɕ, ɕ, k, x, (kʲ), (xʲ)/	rok Smoka ('the Year of the Dragon') róg stołu ('a table corner') wiatr szumi ('the wind rustles') kadr filmu ('a film frame')	[ɾɔk‿smɔka] [ɾuk‿stɔwu] [vʲjatɾ̥‿ʂumʲi] [katɾ̥‿fʲilmu]	
Word final obstruent or obstruent + /m, n, l, r, j, w/	Voiced obstruent: /b, v, d, d͡z, z, d͡ʐ, ʐ, d͡ʑ, ʑ, ɡ, (ɣ), (ɡʲ), (ɣʲ)/	poradź Zosi ('give Zosia (some) advise') rok dobry ('a good year') idź zaraz ('go right now') płot brązowy ('a brown fence')	[pɔɾad͡ʑ‿zɔɕi] [ɾɔɡ‿dɔbɾɨ] [id͡ʑ‿zaɾas] [pwɔd‿bɾɔw̃zɔvɨ]	
Prepositional clitic: w, z, bez, przez, nad, pod, od, przed	Sonorant: /m, n, ɲ, l, r, j, w, i, ɨ, ɛ, a, ɔ, u/	od matki ('from the mother') od łąki ('from a meadow') od ojca ('from the father')	[ɔd‿matk̟i] [ɔd‿wɔŋ̟k̟i] [ɔd‿ɔjt͡sa]	
Prepositional clitic: w, z, bez, przez, nad, pod, od, przed	Voiceless obstruent: /p, f, t, t͡s, s, t͡ʂ, ʂ, t͡ɕ, ɕ, k, x, (kʲ), (xʲ)/	pod płotem ('at/by the fence')	[pɔt‿pwɔtɛm]	
Prepositional clitic: w, z, bez, przez, nad, pod, od, przed	Voiced obstruent: /b, v, d, d͡z, z, d͡ʐ, ʐ, d͡ʑ, ʑ, ɡ, (ɣ), (ɡʲ), (ɣʲ)/	pod dzwonnicą ('beneath a bell tower')	[pɔd‿d͡zvɔɲːit͡sɔw̃]	

Polish obstruents (stops, affricates and fricatives) are subject to voicing and devoicing in certain positions. This leads to neutralization of voiced/voiceless pairs in those positions (or equivalently, restrictions on the distribution of voiced and voiceless consonants). The phenomenon applies in word-final position and in consonant clusters.

In Polish consonant clusters, including across a word boundary, the obstruents are all voiced or all voiceless. To determine (based on the spelling of the words) whether a given cluster has voiced or voiceless obstruents, the last obstruent in the cluster, excluding w or rz (but including ż), should be examined to see if it appears to be voiced or voiceless. The consonants n, m, ń, r, j, l, ł do not represent obstruents and so do not affect the voicing of other consonants; they are also usually not subject to devoicing except when surrounded by unvoiced consonants. Some examples follow (click the words to hear them spoken):

- łódka [ˈwutka] ('boat'), /d/ → [t] before the voiceless k
- kawka [ˈkafka] ('jackdaw'), /v/ → [f] before the voiceless k
- także [ˈtaɡʐɛ] ('also'), /k/ → [ɡ] before the voiced ż
- jakby [ˈjaɡbɨ] ('as if'), /k/ → [ɡ] before the voiced b
- krzak [kʂak] ('bush'), /ʐ/ → [ʂ]; rz does not determine the voicing of the cluster
- odtworzyć [ɔtˈtfɔʐɨt͡ɕ] ('to replay'), /d/ → [t] & /v/ → [f]; w does not determine the voicing of the cluster
- dach domu [daɣ dɔmu] ('roof of the house'), /x/ → [ɣ]; the rule still applies across a word boundary

In some dialects of Wielkopolska and the eastern borderlands, /v/ remains voiced after voiceless consonants.

The above rule does not apply to sonorants: a consonant cluster may contain voiced sonorants and voiceless obstruents, as in król [krul], wart [vart], słoń [ˈswɔɲ], tnąc [ˈtnɔnt͡s].

Utterance-finally, obstruents are pronounced voiceless. For example, the /ɡ/ in bóg ('god') is pronounced [k], and the /zd/ in zajazd ('inn') represents [st]. If followed by a word beginning with an obstruent then the above cluster rules apply across morpheme boundaries. When the second word begins with a sonorant the voicing of any preceding word-final obstruent varies regionally. In western and southern Poland, final obstruents are voiced (voicing pronunciation) if the following word starts with a sonorant (here, for example, the /t/ in brat ojca 'father's brother' would be pronounced as [d]). On the other hand, they are voiceless (devoicing pronunciation) in eastern and northern Poland (/t/ is pronounced [t]). This rule does not apply to prepositional clitics w, z, bez, przez, nad, pod, od, przed which are always voiced before sonorants.

=== Hard and soft consonants ===
Multiple palatalizations and some depalatalizations that took place in the history of Proto-Slavic and Polish have created quite a complex system of what are often called "soft" and "hard" consonants. These terms are useful in describing some inflection patterns and other morphological processes, but exact definitions of "soft" and "hard" may differ somewhat.

"Soft" generally refers to the palatal nature of a consonant. The alveolo-palatal sounds ⟨ń, ś, ź, ć, dź⟩ are considered soft, as normally is the palatal ⟨j⟩. The ⟨l⟩ sound is also normally classed as a soft consonant: like the preceding sounds, it cannot be followed by ⟨y⟩ but takes ⟨i⟩ instead. The palatalized velars /kʲ/, /ɡʲ/ and /xʲ/ might also be regarded as soft on this basis.

Consonants not classified as soft are dubbed "hard". However, a subset of hard consonants, ⟨c, dz, sz, ż/rz, cz, dż⟩, often derive from historical palatalizations (for example, ⟨rz⟩ usually represents a historical palatalized ⟨r⟩) and behaves like the soft consonants in some respects (for example, they normally take ⟨e⟩ in the nominative plural). These sounds may be called "hardened" or "historically soft" consonants.

The historical palatalized forms of some consonants have developed in Polish into noticeably different sounds: historical palatalized t, d, r have become the sounds now represented by ⟨ć, dź, rz⟩ respectively. Similarly palatalized ⟨s, z, n⟩ became the sounds ⟨ś, ź, ń⟩. The palatalization of labials has resulted (according to the main phonological analysis given in the sections above) in the addition of /j/, as in the example pies just given. These developments are reflected in some regular morphological changes in Polish grammar, such as in noun declension.

==== Phonological status of palatalized consonants ====
In some phonological descriptions of Polish, however, consonants, including especially the labials m, p, b, f, w, are regarded as occurring in "hard" and "soft" pairs. In this approach, for example, the word pies ('dog') is analyzed not as /pjɛs/ but as /pʲɛs/, with a soft /pʲ/. These consonants are then also analyzed as soft when they precede the vowel /i/ (as in pić /pʲit͡ɕ/ 'to drink'). Unlike their equivalents in Russian, these consonants cannot retain their softness in the syllable coda (when not followed by a vowel). For example, the word for "carp" has the inflected forms karpia, karpie etc., with soft /pʲ/ (or /pj/, depending on the analysis), but the nominative singular is karp, with a hard /p/.

Similar considerations lead to two competing analyses of palatalized velars. In Sawicka (1995:146–47), all three palatalized velars are given phonological status on the grounds of their distribution and minimal contrasts between [c̱e], [ɟ̱e], [ç̱e] and [c̱je], [ɟ̱je], [ç̱je] e.g. giełda /ˈɡʲɛwda/ [ˈɟ̱ewda] ('stock market'), magiel /maɡʲɛl/ [maɟ̱el] ('laundry press ') but giętki /ˈɡʲjɛntkʲi/ [ˈɟ̱jentc̱i] ('flexible'), higiena /xʲiɡʲjɛna/ [ç̱iɟ̱jena] ('hygiene'). Phonemes /kʲ/, /ɡʲ/ and /xʲ/ do not occur before /a, ɔ, u/ where they are separated by a distinct [j] e.g. kiosk /kʲjɔsk/ [c̱jɵsk] ('kiosk'), filologia /filɔˈlɔɡʲja/ [filɔˈlɔɟ̱ja] ('philology'), Hiob /xʲjɔp/ [ç̱jɵp] ('Job'). A system with /kʲ/ and /ɡʲ/ but without /xʲ/ is given by Rocławski (1976:86), Wiśniewski (2007:187), Jassem (2003:103) and Ostaszewska & Tambor (2000:135). This analysis is based on an assumption that there is actually no [ç̱e] but only [ç̱je] as chie, hie occur only in loanwords. However, a decomposed palatalization of kie, gie i.e. [c̱je], [ɟ̱je] in all contexts is a predominant pronunciation in contemporary Polish. Based on that, a system without palatalized velars is given by Strutyński (2002:73), Rocławski (2010:199) and Osowicka-Kondratowicz (2012:223). In such a system palatalized velars are analyzed as /k/, /ɡ/ and /x/ before /i/ and /kj/, /ɡj/ and /xj/ before other vowels. This is the main analysis presented above.

The consonants t, d, r (and some others) can also be regarded as having hard and soft forms according to the above approach, although the soft forms occur only in loanwords such as tir /tʲir/ ('large lorry'; see TIR). If the distinction is made for all relevant consonants, then y and i can be regarded as allophones of a single phoneme, with y following hard consonants and i following soft ones (and in initial position).

=== Glottal stop ===
In more contemporary Polish, a phonetic glottal stop may appear as the onset of a vowel-initial word (e.g. Ala [ʔala]). It may also appear following word-final vowels to connote particular affects; for example, nie ('no') is normally pronounced [ɲɛ], but may instead be pronounced [ɲɛʔ] or in a prolonged interrupted [ɲɛʔɛ]. This intervocalic glottal stop may also break up a vowel hiatus, even when one appears morpheme-internally, as in poeta ('poet') [pɔʔɛta] or Ukraina ('Ukraine') [ʔukraʔina]. A relatively new phenomenon in Polish is the expansion of the usage of glottal stops. In the past, initial vowels were pronounced with an initial voiceless glottal fricative (so that Ala was pronounced [hala]), pre-iotation (so that igła ('needle') was pronounced [jiɡwa]), or pre-labialization (so that oko 'eye' was pronounced [u̯ɔkɔ]).

=== Dialectal variation ===
In some Polish dialects (found in the eastern borderlands and in Upper Silesia) there is an additional voiced velar fricative /ɣ/, represented by the letter ⟨h⟩. It may be actually a voiced glottal fricative [ɦ] for some speakers, especially word-finally. In most varieties of Polish, both ⟨h⟩ and ⟨ch⟩ represent /x/.

Some eastern dialects also preserve the velarized dental lateral approximant, [ɫ̪], which corresponds to [w] in most varieties of Polish. Those dialects also can palatalize [l] to [lʲ] in every position, but standard Polish does so only allophonically before /i/ and /j/. [ɫ̪] and [lʲ] are also common realizations in native speakers of Polish from Lithuania, Belarus and Ukraine.

Rocławski (1976) notes that students of Polish philology were hostile towards the lateral variant of ⟨ł⟩, saying that it sounded "unnatural" and "awful". Some of the students also said that they perceived the lateral ⟨ł⟩ as a variant of ⟨l⟩, which, he further notes, along with the necessity of deciding from context whether the sound meant was /w/ or /l/, made people hostile towards the sound. On the other hand, some Poles view the lateral variant with nostalgia, associating it with the elegant culture of interwar Poland.

In the Masurian dialects and some neighboring dialects, mazurzenie occurs: postalveolar /ʂ, ʐ, t͡ʂ, d͡ʐ/ merge with the corresponding dentals /s, z, t͡s, d͡z/ unless /ʐ/ is spelled ⟨rz⟩ (a few centuries ago, it represented a fricative trill /r̝/ similar to Czech ⟨ř⟩, distinct from /ʐ/; only the latter sound occurs in modern Polish, with the exception of a small number of dialects).

== Stress ==
The predominant stress pattern in Polish is penultimate: the second-last syllable is stressed. Alternating preceding syllables carry secondary stress: in a four-syllable word, if the primary stress is on the third syllable, there will be secondary stress on the first.

There must be a syllable for each written vowel except when the letter i precedes another vowel (in that case the i represents either /j/, or palatalization of the preceding consonant, or both, depending on analysis; see Polish orthography and the above). Also, the letters u and i sometimes represent only semivowels after another vowel, as in autor /ˈawtɔr/ ('author'); these semivowels mostly occur in loanwords (so not in native nauka /naˈu.ka/ 'science, the act of learning', for example, nor in nativized Mateusz /maˈte.uʂ/ 'Matthew').

Some loanwords, particularly from classical languages, have the stress on the antepenultimate (third-last) syllable. For example, fizyka (/ˈfizɨka/) ('physics') is stressed on the first syllable. That may lead to a rare phenomenon of minimal pairs differing only in stress placement: muzyka /ˈmuzɨka/ 'music' vs. muzyka /muˈzɨka/ – genitive singular of muzyk 'musician'. When further syllables are added at the end of such words through suffixation, the stress normally becomes regular: uniwersytet (/uɲiˈvɛrsɨtɛt/, 'university') has irregular stress on the third (or antepenultimate) syllable, but the genitive uniwersytetu (/uɲivɛrsɨˈtɛtu/) and derived adjective uniwersytecki (/uɲivɛrsɨˈtɛt͡ski/) have regular stress on the penultimate syllables. Over time, loanwords tend to become nativized to have a penultimate stress.

Another class of exceptions to the usual stress pattern is verbs with the conditional endings -by, -bym, -byśmy etc. Those endings are not counted in determining the position of the stress: zrobiłbym ('I would do') is stressed on the first syllable and zrobilibyśmy ('we would do') on the second. According to prescriptive grammars, the same applies to the first and second person plural past tense endings -śmy, -ście although this rule is often ignored in colloquial speech (so zrobiliśmy 'we did' is said to be correctly stressed on the second syllable, although in practice it is commonly stressed on the third as zrobiliśmy). The irregular stress patterns in the presence of these verb endings are explained by the fact that the endings are detachable clitics rather than true verbal inflections: for example, instead of kogo zobaczyliście? ('whom did you see?') it is possible to say kogoście zobaczyli? – here kogo retains its usual stress (first syllable) in spite of the attachment of the clitic. Reanalysis of the endings as inflections when attached to verbs causes the different colloquial stress patterns.

Some common word combinations are stressed as if they were a single word. That applies in particular to many combinations of preposition plus a personal pronoun, such as do niej ('to her'), na nas ('on us'), przeze mnie ('because of me'), all stressed on the bolded syllable of the preposition.

== See also ==
- History of the Polish language
- Polish alphabet
- Polish orthography
- Help:IPA/Polish (a guide to pronunciation of Polish words as represented in Wikipedia articles)

== Bibliography ==
- Bałutowa, Bronisława (1992), Wymowa angielska dla wszystkich [English Pronunciation for all.] (in Polish), p. 27
- Biedrzycki, Leszek (1963), "Fonologiczna interpretacja polskich głosek nosowych" [Phonological interpretation of Polish nasal vowels], Biuletyn Polskiego Towarzystwa Językoznawczego (in Polish), 22: 25–45
- Biedrzycki, Leszek (1978), Fonologia angielskich i polskich rezonantów. Porównanie samogłosek oraz spółgłosek [Phonology of English and Polish resonants. Comparison of vowels and consonants] (in Polish), Warsaw: PWN
- Buczek-Zawiła, Anita (2014), "Nasals as radial categories in Polish and Welsh: An attempt at comparison", Linguistica Silesiena, 35: 7–23
- Dukiewicz, Leokadia (1995), "Fonetyka" [Phonetics], in Wróbel, Henryk (ed.), Gramatyka współczesnego języka polskiego. Fonetyka i fonologia [Grammar of the contemporary Polish language. Phonetics and phonology] (in Polish), Kraków: Wydawnictwo Instytut Języka Polskiego PAN, pp. 7–103
- Dunaj, Bogdan (2006), "Zasady poprawnej wymowy polskiej" [The Rules of Correct Pronunciation in Polish], Język Polski (in Polish), 5: 161–172
- Grzybowski, Stefan (1986), "Z zagadnień konfrontacji fonologicznej języka polskiego i rosyjskiego" [Some remarks on the contrastive phonology of Polish and Russian language] (PDF), Zesz. Nauk. WSP w Bydgoszczy. Studia Filologiczne (in Polish), 27: 163–179
- Gussmann, Edmund (2007), The Phonology of Polish, Oxford University Press, ISBN 978-0-19-926747-7
- Hamann, Silke (2004), "Retroflex fricatives in Slavic languages" (PDF), Journal of the International Phonetic Association, 34 (1): 53–67, doi:10.1017/S0025100304001604, S2CID 2224095
- Jassem, Wiktor (1971), "Podręcznik wymowy angielskiej" [A Handbook of English Pronunciation], Państwowe Wydawnictwo Naukowe, Warszawa
- Jassem, Wiktor (1974), "Mowa a nauka o łączności" [Speech and Communication Science], Państwowe Wydawnictwo Naukowe, Warszawa
- Jassem, Wiktor (2003), "Polish" (PDF), Journal of the International Phonetic Association, 33 (1): 103–107, doi:10.1017/S0025100303001191
- Laver, John (1996), Principles of Phonetics, p. 560
- Lorenc, Anita (2018), "Charakterystyka artykulacyjna polskich sybilantów retrofleksyjnych. Badanie z wykorzystaniem artykulografii elektromagnetycznej" [Articulatory Characteristics of Polish Retroflex Sibilants. Analysis Using Electromagnetic Articulography] (PDF), Logopedia (in Polish), 47 (2): 157–176
- Linde-Usiekniewicz; et al. (2011), Wielki Słownik Polsko-Angielski [Great Polish-English dictionary] (in Polish and English), Wydawnictwo Naukowe PWN, ISBN 978-83-01-14136-3
- Morciniec, Norbert; Prędota, Stanisław (2005) [First published 1985], Podręcznik wymowy niemieckiej (6th ed.), Warsaw: Wydawnictwo Naukowe PWN, ISBN 978-83-01-14503-3
- Osowicka-Kondratowicz, Magdalena; Serowik, Agnieszka (2004), "The Realization of Palato-Velars in Polish", Govor, 21 (2), Odjel za fonetiku Hrvatskoga filološkoga društva: 111–124
- Osowicka-Kondratowicz, Magdalena (2012), "Z zagadnień kategorialności fonologicznej w języku polskim" [Some remarks on Polish phonological categories] (PDF), Prace Językoznawcze (14), Uniwersytet Warmińsko-Mazurski w Olsztynie: 211–224
- Oliver, Dominika; Grice, Martine (2003). Phonetics and Phonology of lexical stress in Polish verbs (PDF). Barcelona: Universitat Autónoma de Barcelona. ISBN 1-876346-48-5.
- Ostaszewska, Danuta; Tambor, Jolanta (2000), Fonetyka i fonologia współczesnego języka polskiego [Phonetics and phonology of the contemporary Polish language], Warsaw: Wydawnictwo Naukowe PWN
- Rocławski, Bronisław (1976), Zarys fonologii, fonetyki, fonotaktyki i fonostatystyki współczesnego języka polskiego [Outline of phonology, phonetics, phonotactics and phonostatistics of the contemporary Polish language] (in Polish), Wydawnictwo Uczelniane Uniwersytetu Gdańskiego
- Rocławski, Bronisław (2010), Podstawy wiedzy o języku polskim dla glottodydaktyków, pedagogów, psychologów i logopedów [The Basics of the Polish language for Glottodidactics, Educators, Psychologists and Speech Therapists] (in Polish) (3rd ed.), GLOTTISPOL, ISBN 978-83-86804-67-2
- Rubach, Jerzy (1994), "Affricates as Strident Stops in Polish", Linguistic Inquiry, 50 (1): 119–143, JSTOR 4178850
- Rubach, Jerzy; Booij, Geert E. (1985), "A grid theory of stress in Polish", Lingua, 66 (4): 281–319, doi:10.1016/0024-3841(85)90032-4, hdl:1887/11158, S2CID 170536799
- Rybka, Piotr (2015), Międzynarodowy alfabet fonetyczny w slawistyce [International Phonetic Alphabet in Slavistics] (PDF) (in Polish), Katowice: Wydawnictwo Uniwersytetu Śląskiego
- Sadowska, Iwona (2012), Polish: A Comprehensive Grammar, Oxford; New York City: Routledge, ISBN 978-0-415-47541-9
- Sawicka, Irena (1995), "Fonologia" [Phonology], in Wróbel, Henryk (ed.), Gramatyka współczesnego języka polskiego. Fonetyka i fonologia [Grammar of the contemporary Polish language. Phonetics and phonology] (in Polish), Kraków: Wydawnictwo Instytut Języka Polskiego PAN, pp. 105–195
- Strutyński, Janusz (2002), Gramatyka polska [Polish Grammar] (in Polish) (6th ed.), Kraków: Wydawnictwo Tomasz Strutyński
- Urbańczyk, Stanisław, ed. (1992), Encyklopedia języka polskiego [Encyclopedia of the Polish language] (in Polish) (2nd ed.), Wrocław: Zakład Narodowy im. Ossolińskich, ISBN 978-83-04-02994-1
- Wierzbicka, <First name unknown> (1971), <title unknown=''> (in Polish), p. 207
- Wierzchowska, Bożena (1980), Fonetyka i fonologia języka polskiego [Phonetics and phonology of the Polish language] (in Polish), Wrocław: Wydawnictwo Polskiej Akademii Nauk
- Wierzchowska, Bożena (1967), Opis fonetyczny języka polskiego [A phonetic description of the Polish language] (in Polish), Warsaw: PWN
- Wierzchowska, Bożena (1971), Wymowa polska [Polish pronunciation] (in Polish), Warsaw: PZWS
- Wiśniewski, Marek (2007), Zarys z fonetyki i fonologii współczesnego języka polskiego [Outline of phonetics and phonology of the contemporary Polish language] (5th ed.), Toruń: Wydawnictwo Naukowe Uniwersytetu Mikołaja Kopernika, ISBN 978-83-231-2133-6
- Zagórska Brooks, Maria (1964), "On Polish Affricates", Word, 20 (2): 207–210, doi:10.1080/00437956.1964.11659819
- Zagórska Brooks, Maria (1968), Nasal Vowels in Contemporary Standard Polish. An Acoustic-Phonetic Analysis, University of Pennsylvania

=== Historical phonology ===
- Kuraszkiewicz, Władysław (1972), "Głosownia historyczna", Gramatyka historyczna języka polskiego (in Polish), Warszawa: Państwowe Zakłady Wydawnictw Szkolnych
- Mańczak, Witold (1983), Polska fonetyka i morfologia historyczna (in Polish), Warszawa: Państwowe Wydawnictwo Naukowe
- Rospond, Stanisław (1973), "Fonologia", Gramatyka historyczna języka polskiego (in Polish), Warszawa: Państwowe Wydawnictwo Naukowe
- Stieber, Zdzisław (1966), Historyczna i współczesna fonologia języka polskiego [The historical and contemporary phonology of Polish] (in Polish) (4th ed.), Warszawa: Państwowe Wydawnictwo Naukowe
