= Hayriye-Melech Xhundj =

Turkish author (1896–1963)

Hayriye-Melech Xhundj (Adyghe: Хъунджэ Хъэйрие-Мелэч, romanized: Xhundjə Həyriye-Meləç; Turkish: Hayriye Melek Hunç; b. 1896 – d. 24 October 1963) was a Circassian writer and teacher. She is considered one of the first Circassian female published writers.

== Early life ==
Melech was born in 1896 in the Haciosman village of Balıkesir (Manyas) province into the noble Xhundj house of the Circassian Ubykh tribe (a tribe expelled to Turkey during the Circassian genocide). Melech's father Kasbolat Bey supported the Ottomans in the Russo-Ottoman War of 1877-1878 by mobilizing a voluntary auxiliary unit of Circassian horsemen from the area around Manyas. Melech studied at a girls' school named Notre Dame de Sion in Istanbul. As per professor Alexandre Toumarkine, in spite of psychological and emotional issues, Melech had a strong and rebellious character. She spoke Turkish, French, Adyghe, Abaza, and Ubykh. She married another Circassian, Yusuf İzzet Pasha, in 1919 and following his death in 1931, she married Prof. Aytek Namitok, yet another Circassian.

== Career ==
=== Social work ===
Melech was one of the members of the Cerkes Ittihad ve Teavün Cemiyeti (Circassian Association for Union and Mutual Aid). The group was founded on November 17, 1908. She participated in the association's social and cultural activities; collecting money for Circassian school, helping in development of Circassian alphabet in non-Arabic letters and writing for publications catering to Circassians. She was editor-in-chief of the journal Diyane (Our Mother) published in 1920, and the author of the newspaper Ghuaze (Guide) published between 1911 and 1914. She also worked for Adyghe, a magazine and newspaper published in Turkish.

=== Literary work ===
During 1908 and 1909 Melech serialized at least 5 writings in the form of stories and poems, which appeared in Mehâsin (an illustrated review). Her first novel, Zühre-i Elem ("The Sorrow of the Shepherd Star"), was published in 1910. She contributed patriotic literature on the Russo-Circassian War, including her 1911 writings in their association's review magazine, Ghuaze. She wrote political articles such as Kabileler Arasında ("Among the Tribes").

== Death and legacy ==
Melech died on 24 October 1963 in Istanbul and was buried at the Karacaahmet Cemetery.
