= State Anthem of Adygea =

Адыгэ Республикэм и Къэрал Орэд Адыгэ Республикэм и Гимн
English: Anthem of the Republic of Adygea
- Coat of arms of Adygea
- Regional anthem of Adygea
- Lyrics: Iskhak Shumafovich Mashbash
- Music: Umar Khatsitsovich Tkhabisimov
- Adopted: 1992

Audio sample
- Official orchestral and choral vocal recording (Adyghe version): file; help

The State Anthem of the Republic of Adygea is one of the official state symbols of the federal subject, along with its flag and emblem. Its lyrics were written by Iskhak Mashbash, and the music was composed by Umar Tkhabisimov. The anthem was approved by decision of the Supreme Council of Adygea on 25 March 1992. This was one of the first decisions made by the republic's parliament after the dissolution of the Soviet Union.

== Lyrics ==
=== Adyghe version ===
Adyghe

Тихэгъэгу кӀасэу тигупсэр
Адыгэ чӀыгушъ, терэӀ.
Зы бын-унагъоу лъэпкъыбэр
ЩызэгурыӀоу щэрэl.

Жъыу:
ШӀум факӀу, лъыкӀуат,
Республикэу тиунэ дах.
Егъэхъу, зыӀат,
𝄆 Республикэу тигугъэ лъаг –
Уилъэпкъы хъишъэр фэӀуат. 𝄇

Дунаим ичӀыпӀэ шӀагъор
Нахьыжъмэ тэ къытфыхах,
Ахэмэ ялӀыгъэ-шӀагъэ
ЛӀэшӀэгъумэ къызэӀэпах.

Жъыу

Хьазабмэ уахэмытыжьэу
Уитыгъэ нэфи ушъхьащыт.
Рассием зыкӀэ ущыщэу
Ащ гукӀи ущышъхьафит.

Жъыу

Тэ тыщыӀэфэ – егъашӀэм –
ТичӀыгоу тыгур щыӀэщт.
Тиуашъуи, тыгъи бэгъашӀэ
Тфэхъоу тикӀасэу тиӀэщт.

Жъыу

English

Our beloved country, our heart and soul,
Is the Adyghe (Circassian) land, may it live forever.
Where many tribes/peoples, as one family,
Live in harmony, may it always be so.

Chorus:
Strive for the good, move forward,
Republic, our beautiful home.
Prosper, rise up,
𝄆 Republic, our high hope,
Tell the history of your people. 𝄇

The most wonderful place in the world
Our elders chose for us.
Their bravery and their deeds
Are handed down through the centuries.

Chorus

You no longer stand in suffering,
Your bright sun is overhead.
Standing in union with Russia,
In spirit, you are free there.

Chorus

As long as we live, forever,
Our land, our heart, will exist.
Our sky and sun will be eternal,
We will have them as our beloved own.

Chorus

IPA transcription (Note: See Help:IPA/Adyghe and Adyghe phonology.)

[tɘj.xə.ʁəɡʷ tʃʼaː.səw tɘj.ɡʷɘ.psər |]
[aː.dɘ.ɣə tʂʼɘ.gʷɘʂ | təj.rəʔ ‖]
[zɘ bɘn wɘ.naː.ʁʷəw ɬə.pqɘ.bər |]
[ɕɘ.zə.ɡʷə.rɘ.ʔʷəw ɕə.rəʔ ‖]

[ʐɘw]
[ʃʷʼɘm faːkʷʼ | ɬɘ.kʷʼaːt |]
[rəj.spu.blɘj.kəw tɘj.wɘ.nə daːx ‖]
[jə.ʁəχʷ | zɘ.ʔaːt |]
𝄆 [rəj.spu.blɘj.kəw tɘj.gʷɘ.ʁə ɬaːɣ |]
[wɘj.ɬə.pqɘ χi.ʂər fə.ʔʷaːt ‖] 𝄇

[dʷɘ.naː.jɘm jɘ.tʂʼɘ.p’ə ʃʼaː.ʁʷər |]
[naː.ħɘ.ʐmə tə qɘ.tfɘ.xaːx |]
[aː.xə.mə jaː.ɬʼɘ.ʁə ʃʼaː.ʁə |]
[ɬʼə.ʃʼaː.ʁ(ʷɘ.)mə qɘ.zə.(ʔə.)paːx ‖]

[ʐɘw]

[ħaː.zaː.bmə waː.xə.mɘ.tɘ.ʑəw |]
[wɘj.tɘ.ʁə nə.fɘj (wɘ.)ʂħaː.ɕɘt ‖]
[rʷəs.sɘj.jəm zɘ.tʃ’ə wɘ.ɕɘ.ɕəw |]
[əɕ gʷɘ.tʃ’ɘj wɘ.ɕɘ.ʂħaː.fɘjt ‖]

[ʐɘw]

[tə tɘ.ɕɘ.ʔə.fə jə.ʁaː.ʃ’əm |]
[tɘj.tʂ’ɘ.gʷəw tɘ.gʷər ɕ’ɘ.ʔəɕt ‖]
[tɘj.waː.ʂʷɘj | tɘ.ʁɘj bə.ʁaː.ʃ’ə |]
[tfə.χʷəw tɘj.tʃ’aː.səw tɘ.ʔəɕt ‖]

[ʐɘw]

=== Russian version ===
Russian

Славься, живи, Адыгея,
Милая сердцу страна.
Наши народы согрела
Добрым согласьем она.

Припев:
Наш сад, цвети,
Солнечный край, крылья взметай,
Родной наш дом,
𝄆 Республика, республика,
Светлая наша мечта. 𝄇

Предками выбрано было
Дивное место для нас,
Мужество, мудрость и силу
Дал нам от дедов Кавказ.

Припев

Гордо с душою свободной,
Вместе с Россией иди,
Солнце твоё над тобою,
Бури невзгод позади.

Припев

Небо родное и нивы
Будут навеки в сердцах,
Будут для нас, пока живы,
В нашей судьбе и делах.

Припев

English

Hail and live, Adygea,
My dear sweethearted country.
Our peoples have warmed her
With an amicable agreement.

Chorus:
Our garden, Flourish
Sunny krai, sweep your wings.
Our native home
𝄆 Republic, Republic,
Our dream will be bright. 𝄇

Our ancestors chose
A wonderful place for us,
Courage, wisdom and strength
Were given by our grandfathers of Kavkaz.

Chorus

Proudly with a free soul,
That goes along with Russia,
Your sun floats above you,
Storms of hardships are left behind.

Chorus

The sky is native and the fields
Will be forever in the hearts,
Will be for us, while alive,
In our destiny and deeds.

Chorus

IPA transcription (Note: See Help:IPA/Russian and Russian phonology.)

[ˈsɫafʲ.sʲɐ ʐɨ.ˈvʲi ɐ.dɨ.ˈɡʲe.ja |]
[ˈmʲi.ɫa.jɐ ˈsʲɛr.t͡su strɐ.ˈna ‖]
[ˈna.ʂɨ nɐ.ˈro.dɨ sɐ.ˈɡrʲɛ.ɫa |]
[ˈdo.brɨm sɐ.ˈɡɫa.sʲjɛm ɐ.ˈna ‖]

[prʲɪ.ˈpʲɛf]:
[naʂ sat | t͡svʲɪ.ˈtʲi]
[ˈsoɫ.nʲɪt͡ɕ.nɨj kraj | ˈkrɨ.lʲja vzmʲɪ.ˈtaj]
[rɐd.ˈnoj naʐ‿dom |]
𝄆 [rʲɪ.ˈspu.blʲɪ.ka | rʲɪ.ˈ.pu.blʲɪ.ka]
[svʲɛt.ɫa.jɐ ˈna.ʂa mʲɪt͡ɕ.ˈta ‖] 𝄇

[ˈprʲɛt.ka.mʲi ˈvɨ.brɐ.nɐ ˈbɨ.ɫa |]
[ˈdʲi.vnɐ.jɛ ˈmʲɛ.sta dʲlʲɐ nas ‖]
[ˈmu.ʐɨs.tvɐ | ˈmu.drɐsʲtʲ i ˈsʲi.ɫu ǀ]
[daɫ nam ɐd‿ˈdʲɛ.dɐf kɐ.ˈfkas ‖]

[prʲɪ.ˈpʲɛf]

[ˈgor.dɐ z‿dʊ.ˈʂo.jʊ svɐ.ˈbod.naj |]
[ˈvmʲɛsʲ.tʲɪ s‿rɐ.ˈsʲi.jɛj i.ˈdʲi ‖]
[ˈson.t͡sɪ tvɐ.ˈjɵ nɐt‿tɐ.ˈbo.ju |]
[ˈbu.rʲi nʲɪ.ˈvzɡot pɐ.zɐ.ˈdʲi ‖]

[prʲɪ.ˈpʲɛf]

[ˈnʲɛ.bɐ rɐ.ˈdno.jɛ i ˈnʲi.vɨ |]
[ˈbu.dʊt nɐ.ˈvʲɛ.kʲi f‿sʲɛr.ˈt͡sax ‖]
[ˈbu.dʊd‿dʲlʲɐ nas | pɐ.ˈka ˈʐɨ.vɨ |]
[ˈv‿na.ʂɨj sʊdʲ.ˈbʲe i dʲɪ.ˈɫax ‖]

[prʲɪ.ˈpʲɛf]
