= International Circassian Association =

- Дунейпсо Адыгэ Хасэ; Дунэепстэу Адыгэ Хасэ; Международная черкесская ассоциация
- Formation: May 4, 1990; 35 years ago
- Type: NGO
- Chairman: Hauti Sohrokov (2023)
- Website: intercircass.org

The International Circassian Association (ICA) (Note: Kabardian: Дунейпсо Адыгэ Хасэ; Adyghe: Дунэепстэу Адыгэ Хасэ; Russian: Международная черкесская ассоциация; also known as the World Circassian Union (Turkish: Dünya Çerkes Birliği)) is the umbrella organization that represents all Circassian institutions around the world. In various Circassian communities, there are local Circassian associations, known as "Adyghe Khase". The aim of these associations is to provide a comfortable environment where Circassians can speak the Circassian language, participate in cultural activities, and learn the principles of the Khabze code. These associations operate on local and regional levels, and communicate internationally through the International Circassian Association. KAFFED, which is the umbrella organization of Circassians in Turkey, is a founding member of the International Circassian Association and remains a member. Despite discussions in 2022 among KAFFED regarding KAFFED's potential withdrawal from the ICS due to KAFFED's perception of the ICS as a Russian puppet organization, it remains as a member.

== Aims ==
The aims of the organization are as follows:

- To support the revival and development of the cultural and spiritual heritage of the Circassian people, and to preserve their national identity.
- To unite the efforts of Circassian public organizations that contribute to restoring the true history of the Circassians and to coordinate their activities.
- To assist in solving economic, social, cultural, and religious issues.
- To help create the necessary conditions for the unification of the Circassians and beyond.
- To promote peace, friendship, and harmony among peoples.
- To prevent social, national, and other types of conflict.

== Ideological views and attitudes ==
The organization advocates Abkhazia's independence. "We are absolutely dissatisfied with the policy of the current leadership of Georgia towards Abkhazia," its head Kasbolat Dzamikhov said in 2006.

In August 2008, during the Five Day War in South Ossetia, the association issued a statement condemning the actions of the Georgian leadership in response to the conduct of Georgian armed forces. The statement declared: "The Georgian authorities, driven by political ambitions placed above the value of human life and the interests of their own people, are acting with recklessness and are cynically violating all previously established international agreements." Blaming the Georgian government, the organization noted: "The tragic events in South Ossetia, provoked by Georgia’s open armed assault on civilians and a contingent of Russian peacekeepers—resulting in the deaths of hundreds of people and the destruction of numerous towns and villages—have caused deep outrage." It further stated: "The blood of innocent civilians and peacekeepers is on the conscience of the Georgian leadership and the armed formations they command."

According to the association, "the leadership of the Republic of Georgia is starting a bloody war for the second time and once again dragging the Georgian people into a tragic situation, pitting them against all the peoples of the Caucasus."

== Activities ==
=== Language and culture ===
The ICA, while in cooperation with KAFFED, organizes annual Circassian language courses.

=== Foreign citizens commission ===
The ICA has established a special commission to address the potential deportation of Circassians from various parts of the world. This commission works in collaboration with state institutions.

=== 2023 Kahramanmaraş earthquakes ===
Following the 2023 Kahramanmaraş earthquakes, the ICA sent a delegation to Turkey. The delegation visited the earthquake-affected areas, received briefings from local authorities, and met with Circassian associations in the region. After the visit, ICA President Hauti Sohrokov stated that aid campaigns were being organized in the Caucasus.

== Member organisations ==
Organisation	Headquarters	Active Region	President	Date of Establishment
KAFFED	Ankara	Turkey	Ünal Uluçay (Halav)	2003
Jordan Circassian Aid Association	Amman	Jordan	Mohammad Hamid Daghzhoka	1932
Syria Circassian Aid Association	Damascus	Syria	Hisham Katt	1948
Israel Circassian Aid Association	Kfar Kama	Israel	Zakaria Napso	1991
Federation Of European Circassians	Hannover	Germany, Belgium, Netherlands	Zati Sönmez	1991
Black Sea Shapsug (Circassians) "Adyghe Khase"	Sochi	Krasnodar Krai	Chachuh Macid	2000
Kabardino-Balkarian Republic Public Institution "Adyghe Hase"	Nalchik	Kabardino-Balkaria	Hafice Muhammed	1990
People's Movement of the Republic of Adygea "Adyghe-Circassian Council"	Maykop	Republic of Adygea	Tlemeshok Ramazan	1990

== History ==
=== Diaspora ===
==== The Formation of Circassian Associations ====
Before the end of the Russo-Circassian War in 1864, the remaining Circassian population began to be deported as part of the Circassian genocide. Estimates, including those based on archival figures from the Russian Government, suggest that 95–97% of the Circassian nation either perished or exiled during this process. The displaced people were primarily resettled in the Ottoman Empire.

Circassians in the Ottoman Empire initially kept to themselves and did not tolerate any external influence. A new generation of Circassian intellectuals took an active role in the Ottoman state, holding high positions. Circassians were a large part of influential organizations such as the Special Organization, the Hamidiye Regiments, and the Committee of Union and Progress. Circassians in Ottoman Empire adopted their Caucasian identity while at the same time maintaining their primary Ottoman-Muslim identity. Circassian cultural activities began in the Ottoman state after the Young Turk Revolution. Political societies such as the Northern Caucasus Society and the Caucasus Independence Committee, both of which aimed for the independence of Circassia and were supported by the Committee of Union and Progress were also founded. The most important of these societies, the Circassian Union and Mutual Aid Society, was founded in 1908. With the ban on minority societies in 1923, these societies were closed.

Outside the borders of Turkey, Circassians continued to form associations in other former Ottoman territories. In 1928, the Circassian Education and Cooperation Association was established in Damascus. In October 1932, the Circassian Charity Organization was founded in Amman. In Turkey, the formation of associations resumed in the 1960s and 1970s, as Circassians who moved from villages to cities established new organizations. The Ankara Circassian Association was founded in 1961 during this period.

==== The Unification of Circassian Associations in Turkey ====
Efforts to unite Circassian-Caucasian Associations in Turkey under a central organization began with a meeting held in Ankara in 1975. This was followed by meetings in Istanbul, Kayseri, Antalya, and in Ankara.

On November 5, 1977, after one of these meetings, Circassians waiting at a bus stop were subjected to an armed attack, resulting in the death of one person. As a consequence, the unification efforts were temporarily halted. From the second half of the 1980s, the associations resumed their activities, and the meetings that had been interrupted in 1977 restarted in the early 1990s. On July 3, 2003, KAFFED was established with the aim of uniting all Circassian associations in Turkey.

=== Caucasus ===
==== The Formation of Circassian Associations ====
The Soviet Government cut off and banned contacts and other connections between the Circassians of the North Caucasus and the Diaspora. Returns of foreign Circassians and visits to their historical homeland were denied. The emergence of a bipolar world, the Cold War, and the Iron Curtain policy were objective factors that separated the Diaspora from the Circassians in the USSR.

Since 1966, the «Homeland» association, which also has branches in the Caucasus, was established in Moscow. Through this organization, relations between Soviet Circassians and Diaspora Circassians were initiated. Official delegations were sent, Diaspora Circassians began receiving Circassian books and magazines, and Circassian youth from Jordan, Turkey, and Syria had the opportunity to study at universities in Kabardino-Balkaria and Adygea.

Since 1989, active efforts began to establish the International Political and Cultural Association. The initiators of this organization were Fethi Rejeb in the Netherlands and Batıray Özbek in Germany. Between the 1980s and early 1990s, numerous social organizations and national movements emerged in Kabardino-Balkaria, Adygea, Karachay-Cherkessia, Krasnodar Krai, Stavropol Krai, and Abkhazia, with Adyghe Khase being one of the most prominent.

==== The Unification of International Circassian Associations ====
The first meeting was held in Amsterdam on May 4–5, 1990. The second meeting was held in Nalchik on May 19–20, 1991. The congress was attended by delegates from Turkey, Syria, Jordan, Israel, Germany, the Netherlands, France, and the USA, as well as delegates from Kabardino-Balkaria, Karachay-Cherkessia, Adygea, the Krasnodar region, and Abkhazia. The congress created the International Circassian Association.

== Notes ==
1. Kabardian: Дунейпсо Адыгэ Хасэ; Adyghe: Дунэепстэу Адыгэ Хасэ; Russian: Международная черкесская ассоциация; also known as the World Circassian Union (Turkish: Dünya Çerkes Birliği)
