= Adyghe Maq =

Russian Adyghe-language newspaper

- Type: General broadsheet
- Founded: 1923
- Language: Adyghe
- Headquarters: ul. Pervomaiskaya, 197; Maykop, Adyghea
- Circulation: c. 4,000
- Website: www.adygvoice.ru

Adyghe Maq (Adyghe: Адыгэ макъ, lit. 'The Adyghe Voice', [aːdəɣa maːq]) is the main Adyghe language newspaper. It is published in the capital of the Adyghe Republic, Maykop, five times a week. It was founded in 1923 and was printed in each of the respective Adyghe alphabets used at the time: the Arabic alphabet until 1927, Latin until 1938 and Cyrillic since. It was printed in the city of Krasnodar until 1936.
