= Iskhak Mashbash =

Circassian poet (1930–2026)

- МэщбэшIэ Исхьакъ (Adyghe); Исхак Машбаш (Russian)
- Mashbash in the c. 1950s
- Born: Iskhak Shumafovich Mashbash (Russified form); 28 May 1930; Urupskiy, North Caucasus Krai, Russian SFSR, Soviet Union
- Died: 7 September 2026 (aged 96); Maykop, Adygea, Russia
- Citizenship: Soviet Union; Russia
- Occupations: Novelist; poet; translator
- Writing career
- Language: Adyghe, Russian
- Years active: 1950–2026
- Genres: Poem, novel
- Notable awards: State Prize of the USSR; State Prize of the RSFSR; Hero of Labour of the Russian Federation; Order "For Merit to the Fatherland"; Order For Services to the Republic of Adygea; Order For Services to the Republic of Dagestan; Order of Honor and Glory of Abkhazia; Order of Friendship of Peoples

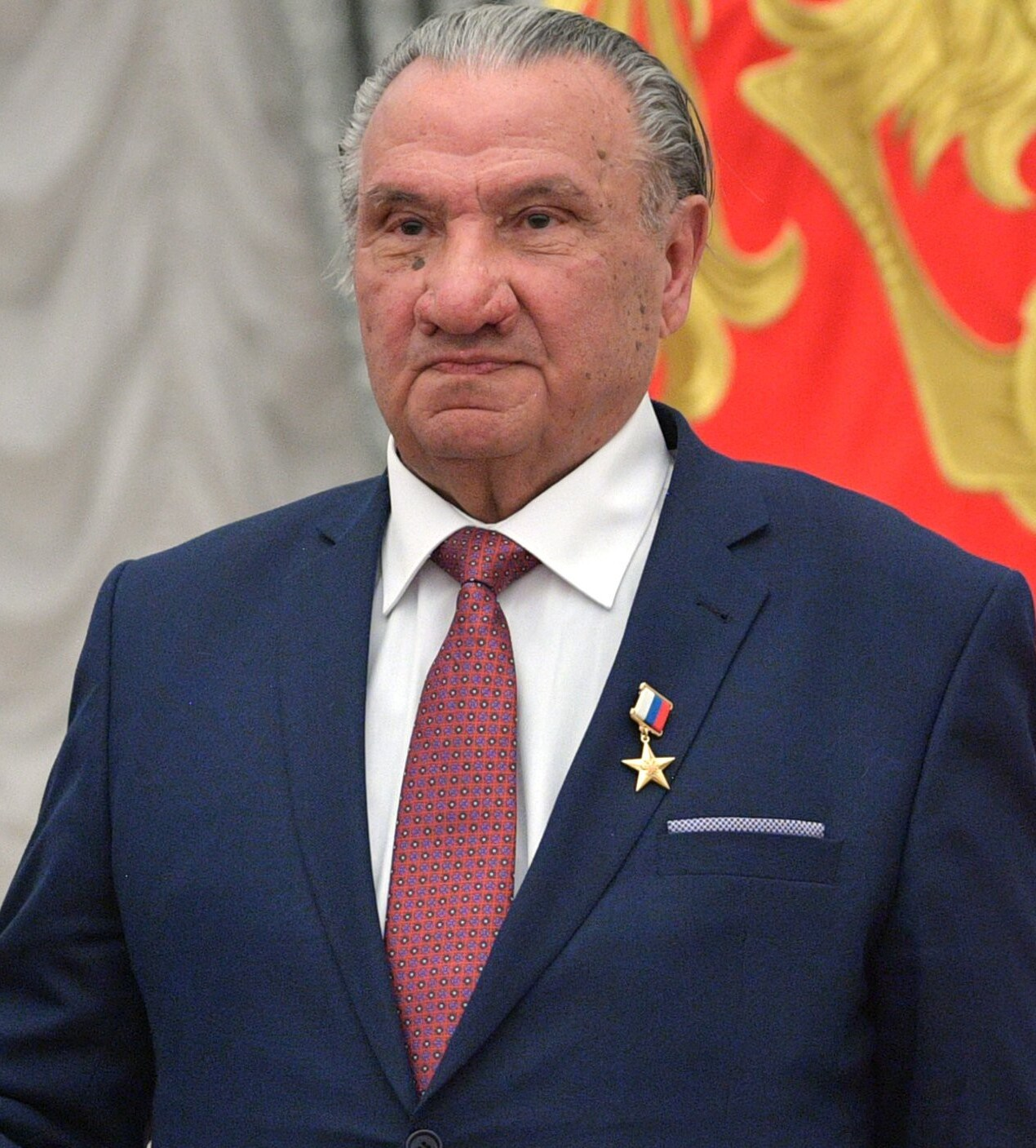
Mashbash in 2019

Iskhak Shumafovich Mashbash (Note: Adyghe: МэщбэшIэ Шумафэ ыкъо Исхьакъ; Russian: Исхак Шумафович Машбаш; Turkish: İshak Meşbaşe) (28 May 1930 – 7 September 2026), also anglicised as Isaac Mashbash, (Note: /ˈmæʃbæʃ/ MASH-bash) was a Soviet and Russian Circassian poet, writer and translator. He authored more than 80 books in Adyghe and translated many works from Russian to Adyghe and Kabardian, including the Quran. His works were published in English, French, Spanish, German, Polish, Mongolian, Turkish, Arabic and other languages. All of his works were published in 20 volumes in Adyghe and Russian in 2015. His works have been translated to Turkish by Fahri Huvaj, a prominent Circassian activist in Turkey.

Mashbash received various awards, including the title Hero of Labor of the Russian Federation (2019), People's Writer of Adygea (1993), Kabardino-Balkaria, Karachay-Cherkessia, the USSR State Prize (1991), the State Prize of the RSFSR (1981), the State Prize of the Republic of Adygea. He is respected by Circassians worldwide. In 2016, a monument of Iskhak Mashbash was built in his homeland, in the village of Urupsky.

== Life and career ==
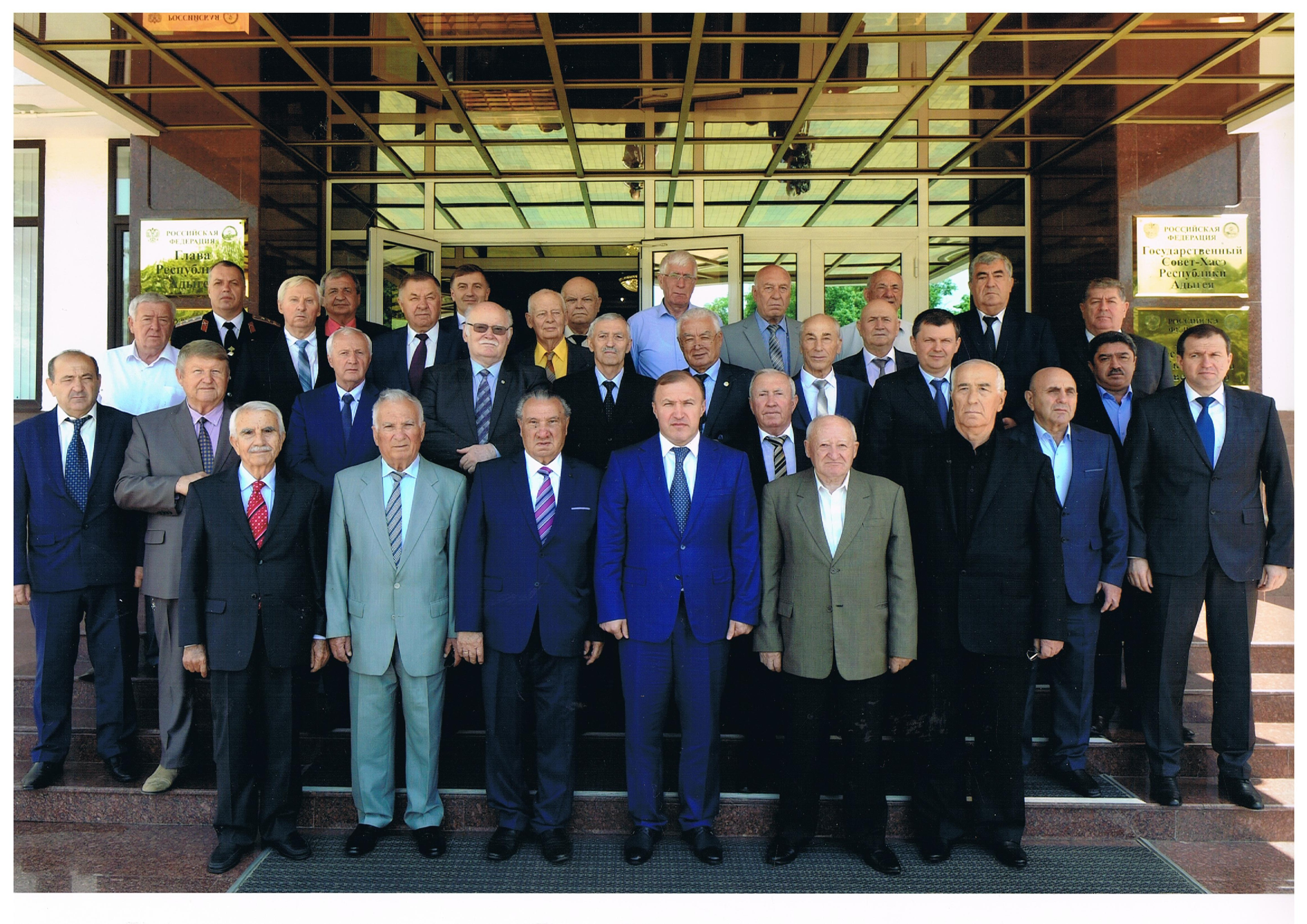
Mashbash with Murat Kumpilov, the president of Adygea

Iskhak Shumafovich Mashbash was born on 28 May 1930 in the village of Urupsky, now in the Uspensky district of the Krasnodar Krai. In 1957 he graduated with honors from the Maxim Gorky Literature Institute in Moscow. In 1962 he graduated from the Department of Press, Television and Radio Broadcasting of the Higher Party School under the Central Committee of the CPSU. From 1956 to 1959 he worked as the head of the department of the regional newspaper "Socialist Adygea". In collaboration with Umar Tkhabisomov, he created the Anthem of the Republic of Adygea.

Mashbash died in Adygea on 7 September 2026, at the age of 96.

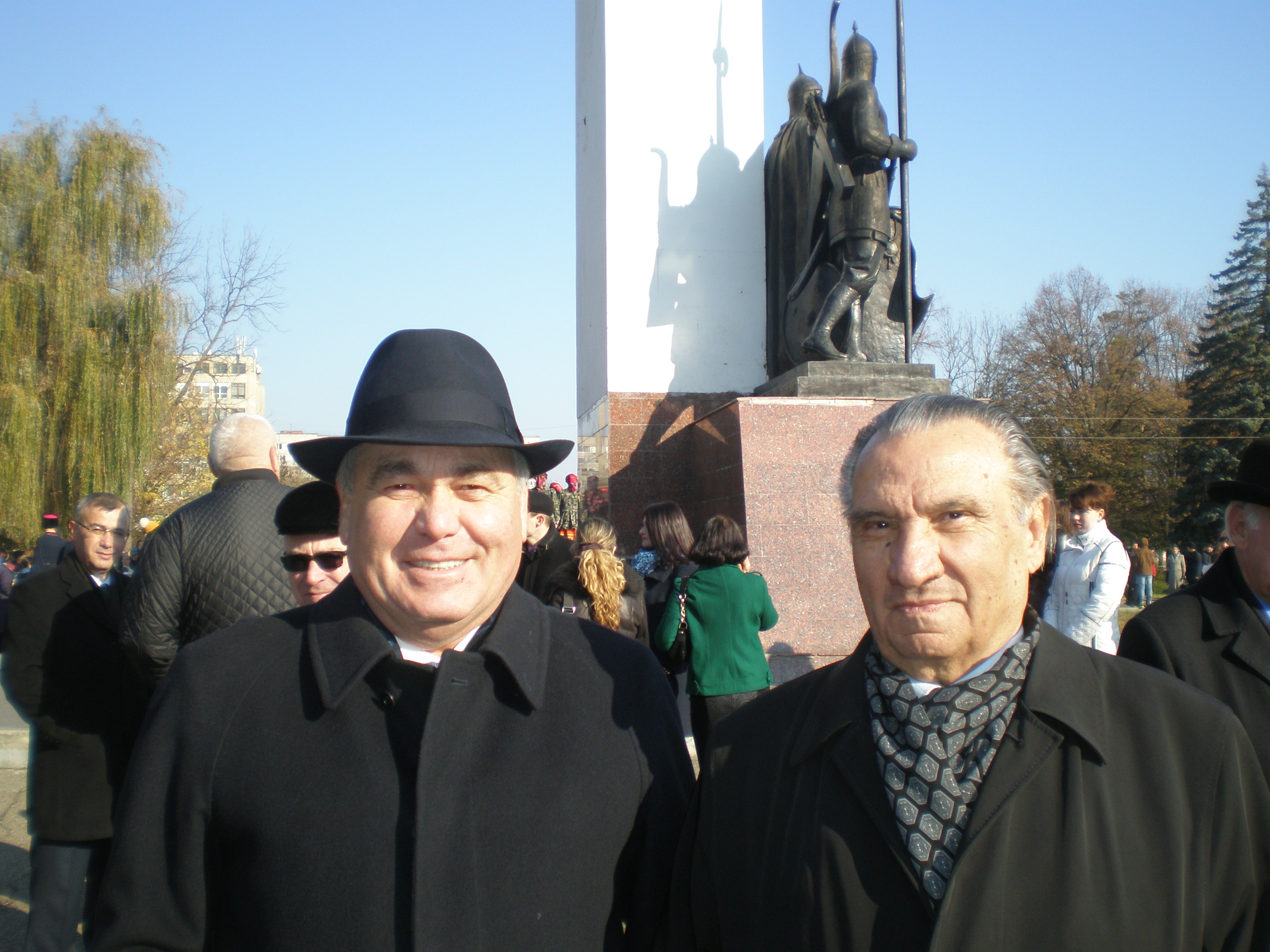
Mashbash with Circassian scientist Rashid Khungarov
