= Wumar Bersey =

Circassian poet

- Бэрсэй Умар
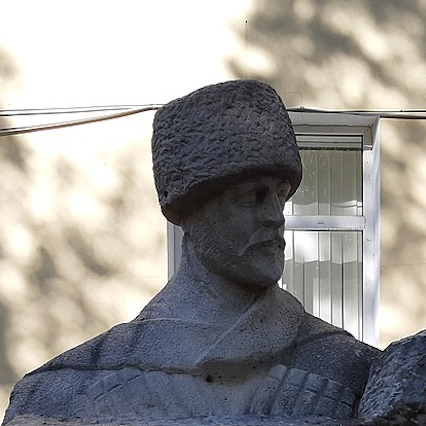
- Born: 1807; Abzakh, Circassia
- Died: Death date unknown
- Writing career
- Language: Adyghe, Kabardian, Russian

Wumar Hephaluqo Bersey (Adyghe: Бэрсэй Хьэпхьалыкъо Умар) was a Circassian writer, poet, fabulist, translator and teacher. He is known as one of the most important figures in Circassian literature. He knew Circassian (Adyghe, Kabardian), French, Arabic, Turkish, Russian, and Tatar.

== Biography ==
He was born in 1807 in a village in the Abzakh region of Circassia, near present-day Maykop. At the age of eight, he was kidnapped by pirates and sold to Muhammad Ali of Egypt, where he was educated. He became fluent in French, Arabic, Turkish, Russian, and Tatar. Between 1840 and 1843, he studied in France. In 1843, he returned to Circassia and worked as an interpreter between the Circassians and the Russians. His date and place of death are unknown.

== Influence ==
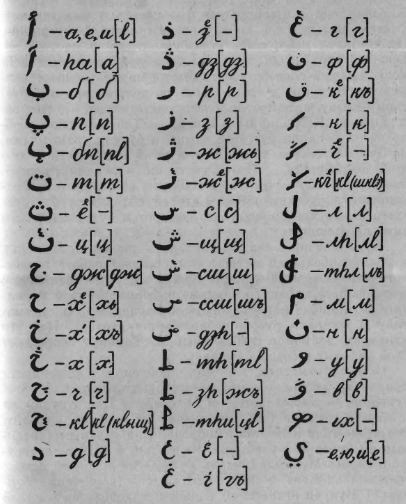
Wumar Bersey's version of the Circassian Arabic alphabet

On March 14, 1855, the day Bersey published his first book, Circassians worldwide celebrate it as the "Modern Circassian Language and Literature Day." A street in Maykop has been named after Wumar Bersey. There is a statue of him on the grounds of Adyghe State University.

== Works ==
Bersey was the first writer to standardize the Circassian Arabic alphabet.

- 1852 - "Ethnographic Essay on the Circassian People"
- 1853 - "The First Book of the Circassian Language in Arabic Letters"
- 1858 - "Circassian Grammar"
- 1861 - "Collection of the Circassian Alphabet"
- 1862 - "Eastern Circassian Alphabet"

Bersey also wrote stories about workers' rights:

- "Two Roosters"
- "Young Man"
- "Woman and Chicken"
- "The Blacksmith and the Doctor"
- "Human and Death"
- "The Arab"
- "Rabbits and Foxes"
