= KAFFED =

Circassian association opposed to the Russian authoritarianism

- Federation of Caucasian Associations
- Кавказ Хасэхэм я Федерацие
- Predecessor: Kaf-der; Circassian Union and Charity Society
- Formation: July 3, 2003
- Type: NGO
- Headquarters: Ankara
- Location: Turkey
- General President: Yaşar Aslankaya
- Affiliations: Circassian nationalism Pan-Caucasianism
- Website: Official website

The Federation of Caucasian Associations (Adyghe: Кавказ Хасэхэм яфедерацие; Kabardian: Кавказ Хасэхэм я Федерацие; Abkhaz: Кавказ Аидгылақәа Рфедерациа; Turkish: Kafkas Dernekleri Federasyonu) or KAFFED is the largest Circassian association in Turkey and is a union of Circassian and other North Caucasian associations from various provinces of Turkey. The Federation describes itself as "criticizing Russia's authoritarian attitude that ignores the existence and rights of the North Caucasian peoples". The KAFFED Chairman has been banned from entering the Russian Federation. KAFFED is a founding member of the International Circassian Association (ICA), there are however debates to leave it due to "ICA acting as a Russian puppet organisation".

KAFFED organizes Circassian Genocide commemoration events every year. After the 2023 Kahramanmaraş earthquakes, they coordinated with the Circassian associations in the region and provided assistance.

== History ==
Circassian cultural activities began in Turkey after the Young Turk Revolution in the Ottoman Empire. Political societies such as the North Caucasian Society (Şimalî Kafkas Cemiyeti) and the Caucasus Independence Committee (Kafkas İstiklâl Komitesi), both aiming for the independence of Circassia and supported by the Committee of Union and Progress, were established. In 1908, the most important of these societies, the Circassian Union and Charity Society, was founded. These societies were closed with the banning of minority societies in 1923.

Association activities in Turkey restarted in the 1960s and 1970s, as Circassians moving from villages to cities established associations. The Ankara Circassian Association was founded during this period in 1961. Efforts to unite Circassian-Caucasian Associations in Turkey under a central organization began with a meeting held in Ankara in 1975. This was followed by meetings in Istanbul, Kayseri, Antalya, and again in Ankara. Following a meeting held on November 5, 1977, Circassians waiting at a bus stop were attacked by armed assailants, and one person lost their life. As a result, activities were suspended. Associations resumed activities in the second half of the 1980s, and meetings interrupted in 1977 restarted in the early 90s. KAFFED was established on July 3, 2003, with the aim of uniting all Circassian associations in Turkey.

== Principles ==
1. KAFFED defends the right of societies everywhere in the world to live with their cultures. It considers genocide a crime against humanity. It views linguistic and cultural differences as a richness for humanity and opposes movements aimed at destroying this richness.
2. It defends the right of people to live their own culture freely, worship in their own religion, and use their own language without being subjected to discrimination.
3. KAFFED accepts May 21 as the symbolic date of the genocide and exile of Circassians by Russia and demands the recognition of this genocide.
4. KAFFED defends the right of return for all peoples torn from their homelands.
5. KAFFED supports initiatives to accept the right of return to their homeland for Circassians living in the diaspora.

== Activities ==
KAFFED organizes annual Circassian genocide commemoration events. Following the 2023 earthquakes, they worked in coordination with Circassian associations in the region to provide aid.

== Board of Directors ==
=== Founding Board ===
President	Muhittin ÜNAL	Ankara
Vice President	Prof.Dr. Günsel AVCI	Istanbul
Vice President	Muharrem TANBOĞA	Eskişehir
Secretary General	Cumhur BAL	Ankara
General Treasurer	Orhan ÖZMEN	Istanbul
Member	Seyfettin DİYNER	Kayseri
Member	İlhan KIYMET	Istanbul

=== Presidents ===
Name	Term
Muhittin Ünal (Agace)	2004-2005
Cihan Candemir (Guğoj)	2006-2011
Vacit Kadıoğlu (Şığalığo)	2011-2013
Yaşar Aslankaya (Hagundeko)	2013-2017
Yıldız Şekerci	2017-2021
Ümit Dinçer (Şogen)	2021-2023
Ünal Uluçay (Halav)	2023-2026
Yaşar Aslankaya (Hagundeko)	2026-...

== Member Associations ==
KAFFED has 53 member associations in 31 provinces. The provinces with the most associations are Istanbul, Balıkesir, and Bursa.

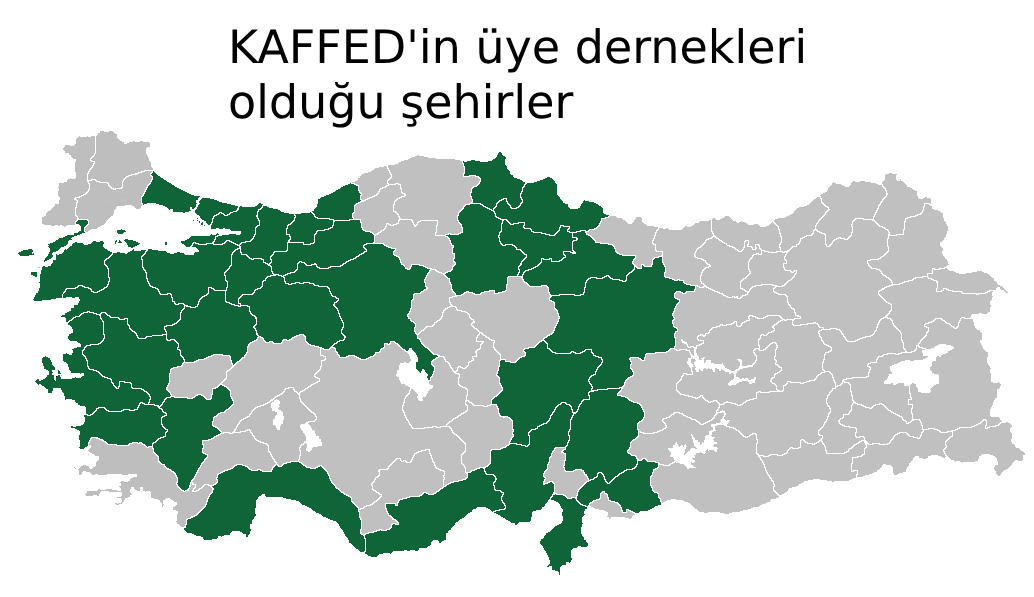
Cities with KAFFED member associations
