= Circassian Union and Charity Society =

Circassian nationalist charitable organization in the Ottoman Empire

- Circassian Union and Charity Society
- Adyghe: Адыгэ Зэготын ыкӀи ЗэдэӀэпыӀэн Хасэ; Ottoman Turkish: چركس اتحاد و تعاون جمعیتی
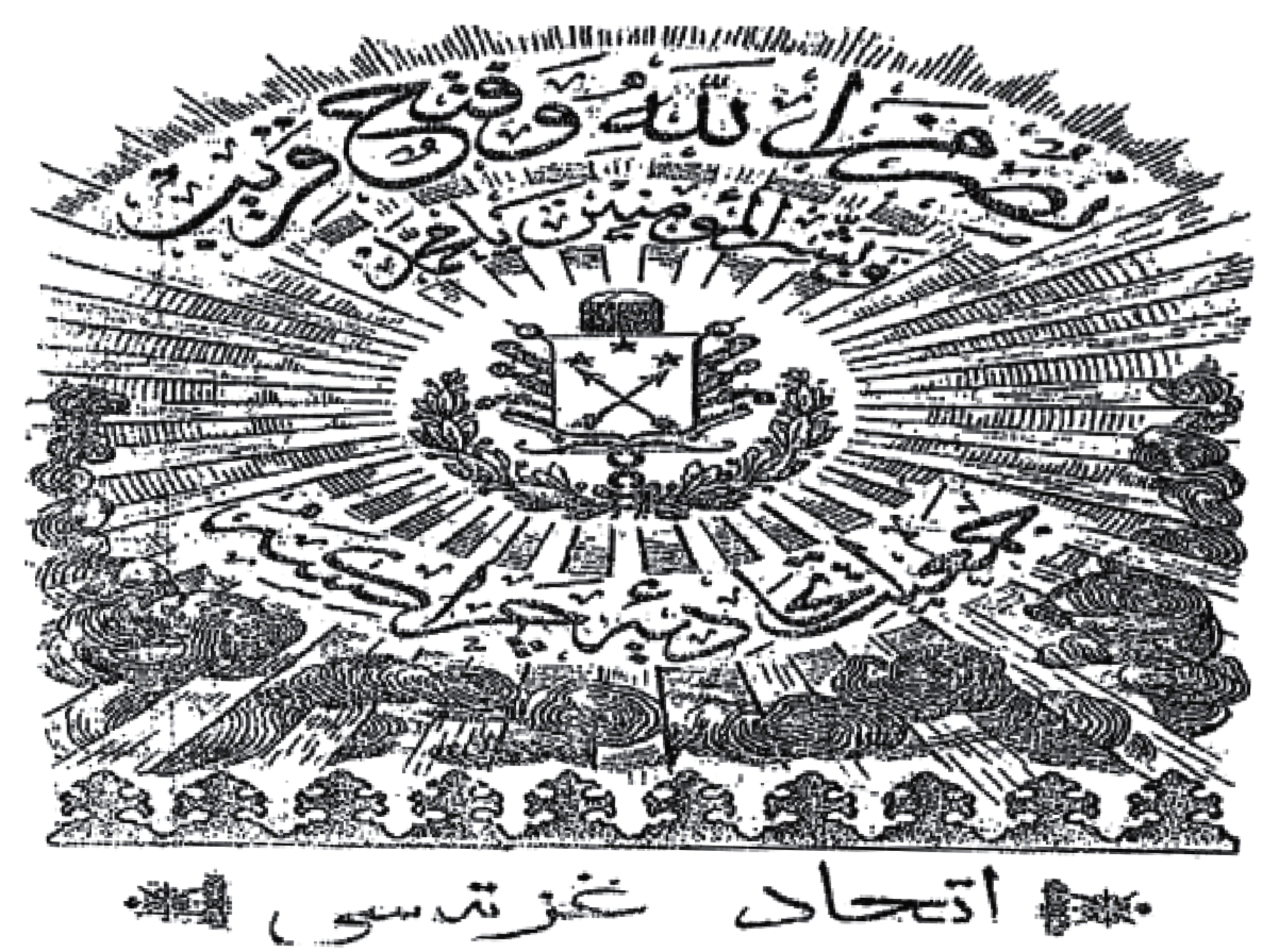
- Emblem of the Circassian Union Society, designed by Ahmed Cavit Pasha.

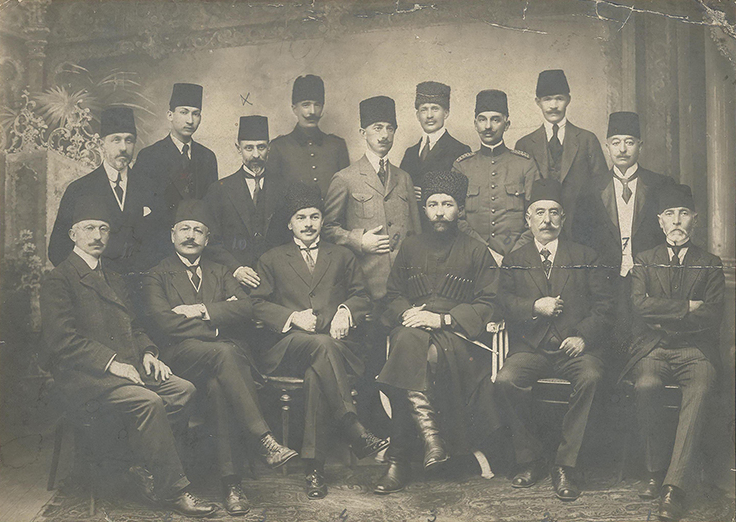
- Representatives of the Republic of the Union of North Caucasian Mountaineers and the leading profiles of the Circassian Union and Charity Society in Istanbul in 1918
- Successor: KAFFED
- Formation: November 4, 1908; 118 years ago
- Dissolved: September 5, 1923; 103 years ago
- Purpose: Preserve Circassian national identity
- Region served: Ottoman Empire
- Official language: Turkish, Circassian
- Leader: Ahmet Cavit Therket Pasha

The Circassian Union and Charity Society (Adyghe: Адыгэ Зэготын ыкӀи ЗэдэӀэпыӀэн Хасэ) or Çerkes İttihat ve Teavün Cemiyeti (Ottoman Turkish: چركس اتحاد و تعاون جمعیتی) was a Circassian nationalist charitable organization in the Ottoman Empire. It was based on several principles, mainly intellectualism, Circassian nationalism, and belief in Islam.

The organization had many activities, and engaged in building schools as well as charity work. The organization's school taught a variety of subjects, including P.E., Geography, Circassian language, Turkish language, French language, Circassian history, Ottoman history, Painting, Music, and more. The school taught in the Adyghe, Turkish and Russian languages.

== History ==
=== Political situation ===
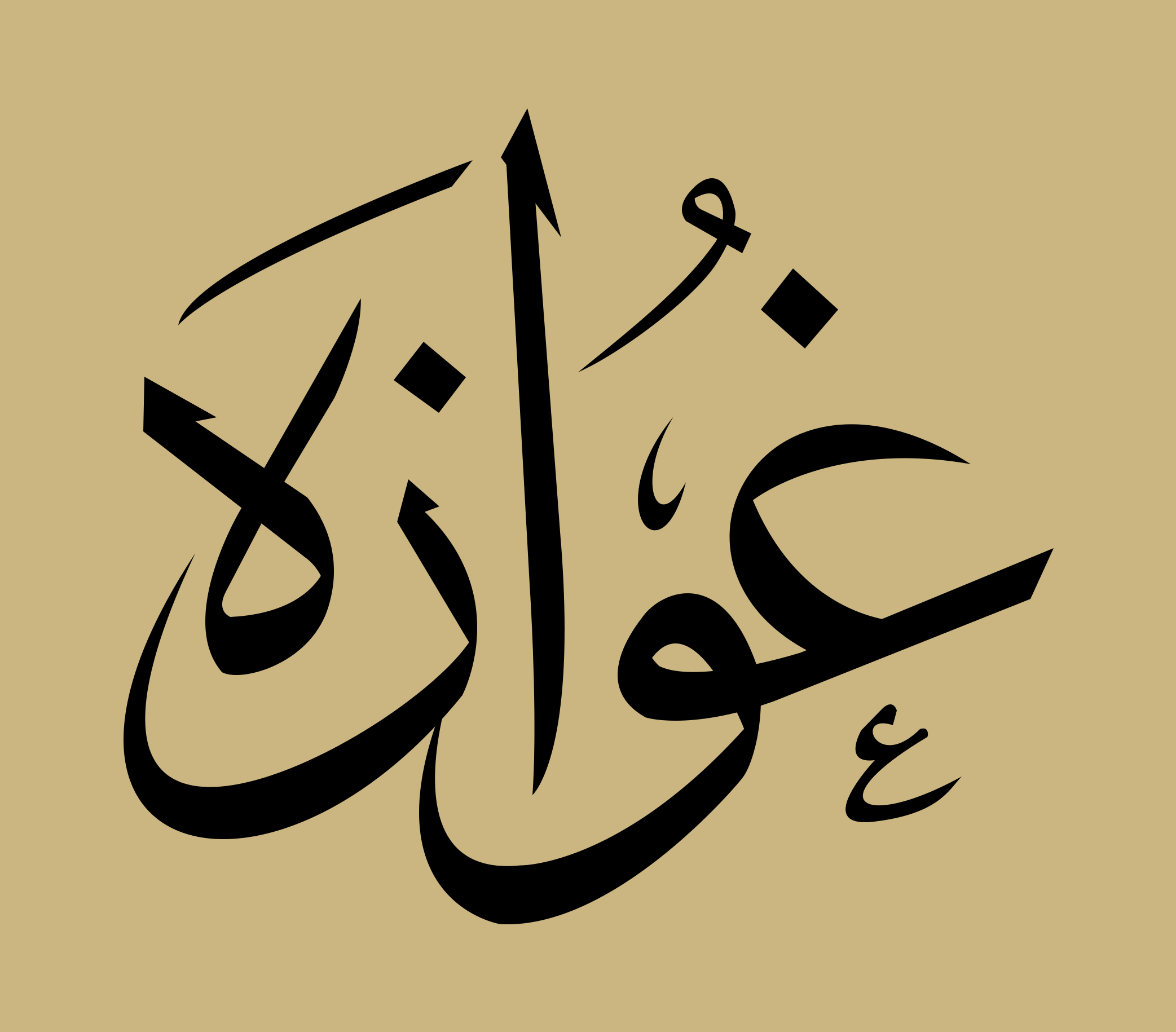
Logo of the organization's newspaper, Ghuaze

Before the end of the Russo-Circassian War in 1864, a mass deportation was launched against the remaining population who survived the Circassian genocide. Calculations including those taking into account the Russian Imperial Government's own archival figures have estimated a loss of 95–97% of the Circassian nation in the process. The displaced people were settled primarily to the Ottoman Empire.

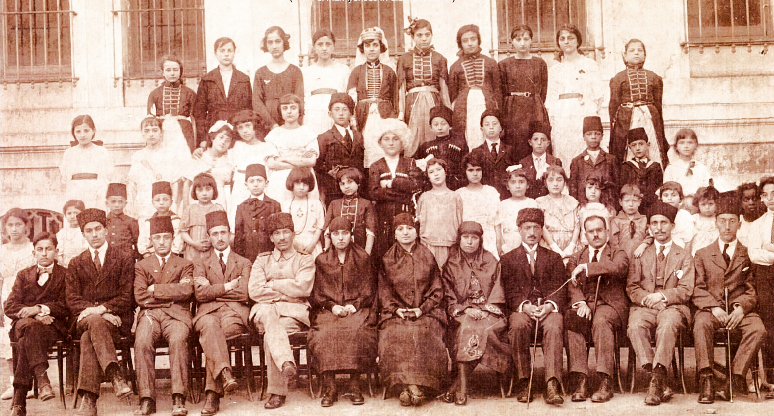
Circassian students and teachers in a Circassian school opened by the Circassian Union and Charity Society

Circassians who were exiled to Ottoman lands suffered heavy tolls. The Circassians were initially housed in schools and mosques or had to live in caves until their resettlement. The Ottoman authorities assigned lands for Circassian settlers close to regular water sources and grain fields. Numerous died in transit to their new homes from disease and poor conditions. Circassians in the Ottoman Empire initially kept to themselves and maintained their separate identity, even having their own courts, in which they would tolerate no outside influence.

The next generation of Circassian intellectuals took an active role in the Ottoman state with high positions. A large portion of influential entities, such as the Ottoman Special Organization, Hamidiye regiments, and the Committee of Union of Progress were made up by Circassians. Circassians in the Ottoman lands embraced their Caucasian identity, while also maintaining a primary Ottoman-Muslim identity. After the 1908 Revolution in the Ottoman Empire, Circassian cultural activities started. Some were less cultural and more political, such as the Şimalî Kafkas Cemiyeti (North Caucasian Society) and the Kafkas İstiklâl Komitesi (Committee for the Liberation of Caucasus), both of which aimed for the independence of Circassia and were supported by the CUP.

=== Formation ===
In the new situation where freedoms were expanded, Circassians immediately began to organize. In August 1908, the first members laid the foundation of the Circassian Union and Charity Society in the mansion of Imam Shamil's son Gazi Mehmet Pasha in Koska, Istanbul.

Along with several generals and pashas, the organization attracted the period's top intellectuals and literary figures. Among these individuals were Ahmet Cavit Therket Pasha, Abdullah Pasha, Berzeg Zeki Pasha, Gazi Muhammed Fazil Pasha, Nazmi Pasha, Shapli Osman Pasha, Ahmet Hamdi Pasha, Izzet Pasha, Ismail Berkok, Ahmet Mithat Efendi, and Professor Aziz Meker. The Circassian Union and Charity Society was officially founded on November 4, 1908. Following the closure of the first building, the organization relocated to a new building on Aksaray Sinekli Bakkal Street.

Ahmet Cavit Therket Pasha was elected as the organization's chairman, a position he held until his death in 1916. The majority of the organization's members were well educated, having graduated from premier schools of the time knowing at least one foreign language in addition to their native languages, Circassian and Turkish. Among these foreign languages were French, Arabic, Greek, English, and others.

People in the organization held a variety of ideological beliefs, including those who supported the Committee of Union and Progress (CUP) and others who opposed it.

The organization's plan was to promote religious, moral, and civil ties among Circassians, as well as education. One of the objectives was to study Circassian history, language, and traditions. It was emphasized that junior high schools should be established in each Circassian village to provide free education to Circassian children in the Circassian language. It was also agreed to establish a Circassian newspaper and journals. The organization's newspaper, Ghuaze, is still published today. A paramilitary branch was proposed for the organization, but it was rejected since the organization promised absolute loyalty to the Ottoman Empire.

Overall, the organization's main goal was to perform high-quality education and research in order to produce a generation of highly educated, pious, nationalist Circassians who are loyal to the Ottoman Empire capable of saving the Circassian nation. To promote this ideal, Quranic verses about gaining knowledge were quoted in the organization's newspaper.

The teaching squad of the main school was:

Subject	Teacher(s)
School manager	İhsan Bey
Geography	Seza Hanım
History	Jankat Lami, Harun Blenaw
Circassian language	Hilmi Tsey, Shemi Time
Turkish language	Zekiye Wenje
French language	Lütfullah Shaw
Painting and arts	Prof. Namık İsmail Zeyf, Muhsin bey
Physical education	Sait Nexush
Music	Prof. Hege Efendi

==== Women's branch ====
On May 18, 1919, the Circassian Women's Charity Society (Çerkes Kadınları Teavün Cemiyeti) was established as a section of the Circassian Union and Charity Society. The founders of the women's branch were five women: Xundj Hayriye Melech, Berzeg Maqbule, Zaliqwe Emine Reşit, Pexw Seza Polar and Ulagay Faika. The women's branch's manifesto reads: "The organization's goal is to assist individuals in need of Circassian assistance, to protect girls and boys in orphanages, schools, and workhouses, and to promote national culture. Women are compassionate and merciful creatures, and it is our responsibility to promote this throughout the world." After being dissolved in 1923, the women's branch was re-founded in 2012 with the same name.

=== Dissolution ===
In 1923, the Turkish government closed down and banned the organization. Although Circassians had always been greatly loyal to the government, they were treated the same as the more rebellious Kurds under the new Republic of Turkey, and the Circassian language was banned. As a result, the organization was declared illegal, and the main building was demolished. Schools were closed, the newspaper was banned, and many of the members were arrested.
