= Adyghe language =

Northwest Caucasian language

Adyghe
- West Circassian
- Адыгабзэ; Adygabze; آدہݝابزە
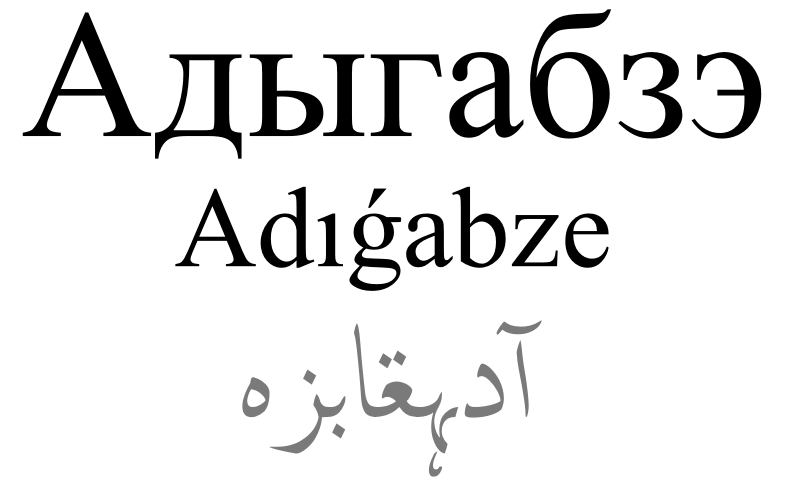
- Self-designation "Adyghe language" written in the Cyrillic, the ABX Latin and the now-defunct Arabic scripts.
- Pronunciation: [aːdɘɣaːbzə́]
- Native to: Adygea; Krasnodar Krai
- Ethnicity: Circassians; Cherkesogai
- Native speakers: 610,000 (2010–2020)
- Language family: Northwest Caucasian: Circassian; Adyghe
- Early forms: Proto-Northwest Caucasian: Proto-Circassian
- Dialects: Abzakh; Bzhedug; Hatuqay; Shapsug; Hakuchi; Chemguy; Literary Adyghe (standard dialect); Mamkhegh †; Makhosh †; Natukhaj (†); Ademey (†); Yegeruqwai †; Zhaney †
- Writing system: Cyrillic (Russia and diaspora); Latin (Diaspora only) Arabic (obsolete); Greek (obsolete)

Official status
- Official language in: Russia: Adygea
- Recognised minority language in: Israel: Kfar Kama; Rehaniya

Language codes
- ISO 639-2: ady
- ISO 639-3: ady
- Glottolog: adyg1241
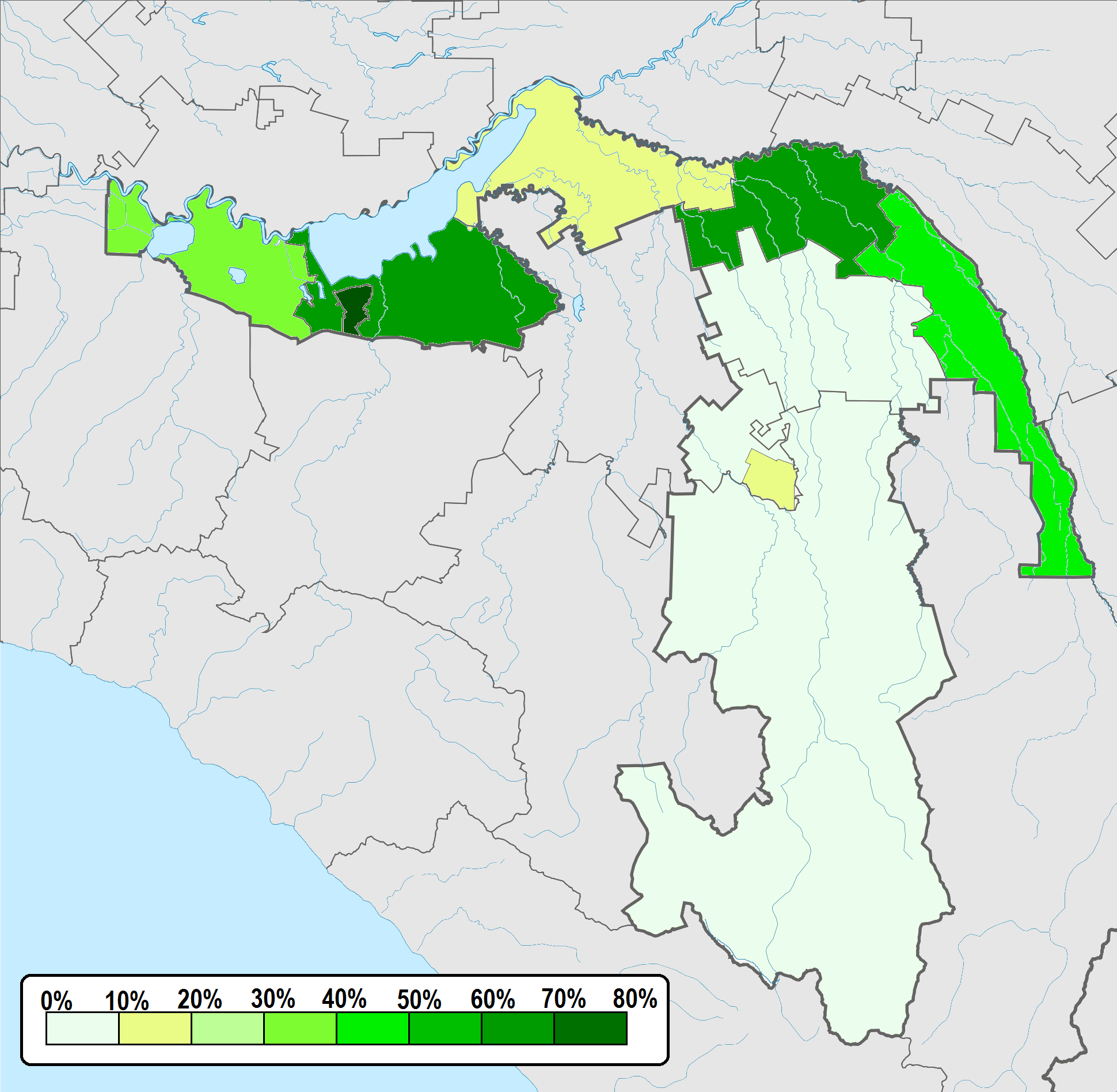
- Distribution of the Adyghe language in Adygea (2002)

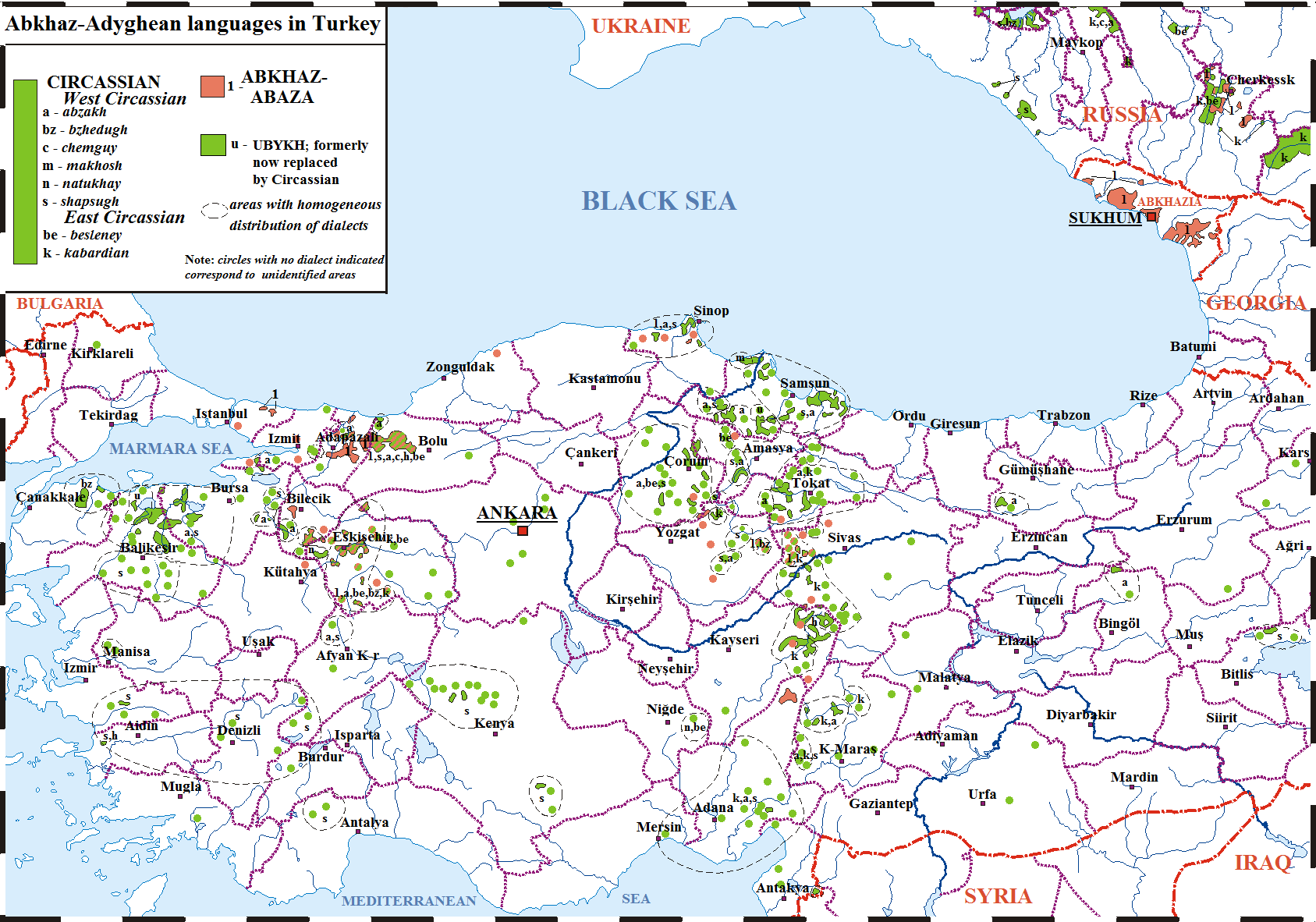
- Northwest Caucasian languages in Turkey and the Caucasus

Yinal speaking Adyghe in different dialects. In order: Shapsug, Bzhedug Abzakh, Kabardian

Adyghe, (Note: /ˈædɪɡeɪ/ A-dig-ay or /ˌɑːdɪˈɡeɪ/ AH-dig-AY; Adyghe: Адыгабзэ, pronounced [aːdɘɣaːbzə́]) also known as West Circassian (Note: Adyghe: КъохьэпӀэ Адыгабзэ, lit. 'Western Circassian'; Kabardian: КъухьэпӀэ Адыгэбзэ, lit. 'Western Circassian') (or Lower Circassian (Note: Adyghe: КӀах Адыгабзэ, КӀахыбзэ, lit. 'Lower Circassian, Lower language'; Kabardian: КӀах Адыгэбзэ, КӀахыбзэ, lit. 'Lower Circassian, Lower language')), is a Northwest Caucasian language spoken by the western subgroups of Circassians. Native to Circassia in the Caucasus, it is one of the two official languages of Adygea (the other being Russian), although it is mainly spoken in Turkey, Jordan, Syria, and Israel, where Circassians settled after the Circassian genocide by the Russian Empire. Adyghe literary language (Adyghe: Литературабз) is the standardised form of the language, based mostly on the Chemguy dialect which was chosen for its grammatical and phonological simplicity, it was also historically spoken by the Prince of Princes of Circassia. In addition to Chemguy, there was also significant input from Shapsug, Bzhedug, Abzakh and other dialects. Adyghe is often classified as moribund or endangered, with some academic evaluations projecting a potential survival horizon of 25 to 50 years under current sociolinguistic conditions.

Adyghe is closely related to the Kabardian or East Circassian language; some reject the distinction between the two languages in favour of both being dialects of a unitary Circassian language, others argue they are closely related but technically distinct languages. Despite phonological differences, Circassian languages are reciprocally intelligible, with speakers being able to communicate with varying degrees of efficiency. While the self-designation for both Adyghe and Kabardian language is Adyghe, in linguistic and administrative terms, "Adyghe" refers specifically to the language of the western tribes of Circassians, while "Kabardian" refers to the language of the two eastern tribes (Kabardians and Besleney). Ubykh, Abkhaz and Abaza are more distantly related to Adyghe.

== Classification ==
Adyghe is also known as West Circassian or Lower Circassian. Adyghe belongs to the Northwest Caucasian language family. Glottochronological studies suggest that the common Proto-Northwest Caucasian language split into the Circassian, Abkhaz, and Ubykh branches roughly 5,000 years ago.

== History ==
=== Standardization of Adyghe ===
==== Pre-Soviet attempts ====
One of the earliest attempts to create a standard for the Adyghe language was made by Natouko Sheretluk (Natouko Efendi), a Shapsug nobleman. He opened a madrasa in his native village of Bogundyr and compiled an Adyghe alphabet and grammar. Leonty Lyulye, a Russian official who lived for many years among the Shapsugs, Natukhays, and Abadzekhs on the Black Sea coast, published a "Russian-Circassian Dictionary" and a brief grammar in Odessa in 1846. Lyulye identified three dialects of Adyghe: "Kabardian", "Besleney", and a third he called "Common Circassian" (referring to the Western coastal dialects). He tried to base his dictionary on this "Common" dialect. Another pre-Soviet attempt was made by Wumar Bersey, an Abzakh. On March 14, 1853, he published the "Primer of the Circassian Language" (Adyghe Alphabet) in Tiflis (Tbilisi), based on the Arabic script. This date (March 14) is now celebrated annually as the "Day of the Adyghe Language".

==== Modern Standard Adyghe ====
The standard register of Adyghe, known as Literary Adyghe (Adyghe: Литературабз, lit. 'Literature language'), was created by Circassian linguist Daut Ashkhamaf based largely on the Chemguy dialect, which was chosen for its simplicity. However, Literary Adyghe is a constructed dialect and is distinct from the natural Chemguy dialect, as there was significant input from the dialects of other tribes who remained in the Caucasus after the Circassian exile, spesifically the Bzhedug, Shapsug, and partly Abzakh. In the 1930s, Ashkhamaf even utilized the term "Bzhedug-Temirgoy dialect" to describe the basis of the literary language. He argued that through the development of the literary language, these dialects were merging. In some cases, literary dialect preferred words from other dialects over Chemguy words, such as Bzhedug "Ӏэ" (hand) and "тхьэ" (god) instead of the Chemguy "Ӏа" and "тхьа", as well as specific ordinal numbers and verb forms. Thus, being supra-dialectal, literary Adyghe stands in contrast to territorial dialects and serves as the unifying literary form of the language for speakers of diverse dialects.

=== Attempts to unify Adyghe and Kabardian ===
There were proposals to merge Adyghe and Kabardian to create a single Circassian literary language. Another proposal was to select one of the two to serve as the single literary language for all Circassians. A rejected proposal by Circassian scholars argued for recognizing Kabardian as the sole literary language for all Circassians, as it had the most speakers. There were attempts to create a single unified alphabet for Adyghe, Kabardian, Chechen and Karachay-Balkar; but efforts failed because the leaders of the movement were accused of being "bourgeois nationalists" and executed in 1937. One year earlier, Z.M. Naloev, who was involved in the creation of the Kabardian alphabet, was executed by firing squad for alleged treason; he was rehabilitated posthumously in 1957. The Bolsheviks supported the creation of separate alphabets and grammars for the "Kyakh" (Western; the modern Adyghe language) and Kabardian, despite ongoing debates on unifying them. Thus, Adyghe and Kabardian speakers could communicate easier orally as opposed to in writing due to different graphical representations and spelling rules. A more moderate proposal developed by the linguist M.A. Kumakhov aimed to unify the alphabets and orthography without forcing a complete merger of spoken Adyghe and Kabardian. This project proposed standardizing the representation of identical phonemes (using the same letter for the same sound where they currently differ, such as the Adyghe жъvs. Kabardian жь). The project was accepted by specialists at regional conferences in Nalchik and Maikop in 1998 and 1999. While the Parliament of the Kabardino-Balkarian Republic approved the project, the Parliament of the Republic of Adygea did not proceed to discuss it. The "One Nation, One Republic, One Language" (Зы Лъэпкъ, Зы Республик, Зы Бзэ) movement among Circassians pushes for the unification of the three Circassian republics and recognition of Adyghe and Kabardian as not related languages, but as dialects of a single Circassian language, arguing that the division of Circassians into different "nations" (Adyghe vs. Kabardian vs. Cherkess) was a result of Soviet "ethnic engineering". The International Circassian Association (ICA) officially stated the goal of creating a "uniform Circassian language" in its 2015 congress resolution.

== Publications ==
There are many books written in or translated into Adyghe. А significant milestone was the publication of the "ABC-book of the Circassian language" by Wumar Bersey in Tbilisi on March 14, 1853, a date now celebrated as the Day of the Adyghe Language and Writing.

In the early 20th century, reformist movements in Baksan led to the publication of religious and ethical textbooks such as "The History of Islam" (Мыслъымэн Тхыдэ) in 1918. A popular Adyghe translation of the Quran was made by Koshbaye Pshimaf Iskhak Mashbash. The New Testament and many books of the Old Testament have been published in Adyghe by the Institute for Bible Translation in Moscow. In 2020 a bilingual edition of Ecclesiastes was released in Adyghe and Kabardian.

In 1908, Circassian Union and Charity Society in Istanbul began printing Adyghe language texts in the newspaper Ghuaze. Following this, the "Adığe-Gazete" (Adyghe Newspaper) was introduced in 1919. In 1920, the bulletin "Diyane" was published in Istanbul using a Latin-based Adyghe alphabet.

In the Middle East, a Circassian cultural society established in 1927 in El-Quneitra, Syria, published the newspaper "Mardzh" (Voice) from 1928 to 1932.

Adyghe Maq is the main Adyghe language newspaper in Russia. It is published in the capital of the Adyghe Republic, Maykop, five times a week. The newspaper "Socialist Adygea" started in Krasnodar in 1926 and relocated to Maikop ten years later. he Adigean branch of the Union of Soviet Writers launched the literary almanac "Friendship" in Maikop in 1946. For younger readers, the children's magazine "Constellation" is published in the Adyghe language. Other early newspapers included Qerehetlıq (Black People) in 1924 and Adığe Psevuç (Adyghe Life) in 1926.

One of the most important translated texts in the Adyghe language is the Adyghe Mawlid, an Islamic text, a translation of Süleyman Çelebi's Ottoman Turkish text, "Vesîletü'n-Necât". This translation was undertaken by the Circassian scholar Abdurrahman Efendi. The Adyghe Mawlid is written in the Shapsug dialect, with a very large number of Arabic, Turkish Persian loanwords. The original publication utilized a modified Arabic/Ottoman alphabet, incorporating specialized marks and letters to represent unique Circassian phonemes that do not exist in standard Ottoman Turkish. Poetically, the translation remains highly faithful to Süleyman Çelebi's original structure. It consists of 1,034 lines (517 couplets) and strictly adheres to the classical remel meter (fâilâtun fâilâtun fâilun). The text is recited in Circassian villages to this day.

== Vitality ==
According to the UNESCO 2009 map entitled "UNESCO Map of the World's Languages in Danger", the status of the Adyghe language in 2009, along with all its dialects (Adyghe, Western Circassian tribes; and Kabard-Cherkess, Eastern Circassian tribes), is classified as vulnerable.

== Dialects ==
- Proto‑Circassian
  - Proto-East Circassian
    - Kabardian
    - Besleney
  - Proto‑West Circassian
    - Kuban river
      - Chemguy
      - Abzakh
      - Bzhedugh
      - Hatuqay
    - Black Sea coast
      - Shapsug
      - Natukhaj

A Circassian dialects family tree.

=== Black Sea coast dialects ===
- Shapsug dialect (Шапсыгъабзэ)
  - North Shapsugs, Great Shapsugs, Kuban Shapsugs (Шапсыгъэ шху) dialect
    - Kfar Kama dialect (Кфар Камэм ишапсыгъэбзэ)
  - Chemguy-Shapsugs, Pseuşko accent (КӀэмгуе-шапсыгъ)
  - South Shapsugs, Small Shapsugs, Coastal Shapsugs, Black Sea Shapsugs (Шапсыгъэ-цӀыкӀу) dialect
  - Hakuchi dialect (ХьакӀуцубзэ, Къарацхаибзэ)
- Natukhai dialect (НэтӀхъуаджэбзэ)
- Zhaney dialect

=== Kuban River dialects ===
- Bzhedug dialect (Бжъэдыгъубзэ): spoken by Circassians in the Republic of Adygea and the Biga district of the city of Çanakkale in Turkey
- Chemguy (Adyghe: КӀэмыгуябзэ, КӀэмгуибзэ): literary standard of Adyghe. Also spoken by Circassians in the Republic of Adygea
- Abzakh dialect (Aбдзэхабзэ): spoken by Circassians in the village of Rehaniya in Israel and Circassians in Syria from the Golan Heights
- Mamkhegh dialect
- Yegeruqay dialect
- Hatuqay dialect
- Makhosh dialect

== Phonology ==
Adyghe exhibits between 50 and 60 consonants depending on the dialect. All dialects possess a contrast between plain and labialized glottal stops. A very unusual minimal contrast in the Abzakh dialect is a three-way contrast between plain, labialized and palatalized glottal stops. The Shapsug (Black Sea) dialect of Adyghe contains a very uncommon sound: a voiceless bidental fricative [h̪͆], which corresponds to the voiceless velar fricative [x] found in other varieties of Adyghe. This sound is only known to be used in the Black Sea dialect.

Adyghe consonant system
		Labial		Alveolar			Post-alveolar	Alveolo- palatal	Retroflex		Velar			Uvular		Pharyngeal	Glottal	
		plain	lab.	plain	lab.	lat.	Post-alveolar	Alveolo- palatal	plain	lab.	plain	lab.	pal.	plain	lab.	Pharyngeal	plain	lab.
Nasal		m		n														
Plosive	voiceless	p		t							k^{1}	kʷ	(kʲ)^{2}	q	qʷ		ʔ	ʔʷ
Plosive	voiced	b		d							ɡ^{1}	ɡʷ	(ɡʲ)^{2}					
Plosive	ejective	pʼ	pʷʼ	tʼ	tʷʼ							kʷʼ	(kʲʼ)^{2}					
Affricate	voiceless			t͡s			t͡ʃ		t͡ʂ	t͡ʂʷ								
Affricate	voiced			d͡z			d͡ʒ			d͡ʐʷ								
Affricate	ejective			t͡sʼ			t͡ʃʼ			t͡ʂʼ								
Fricative	voiceless	f		s		ɬ	ʃ	ɕ	ʂ	ʂʷ	x			χ	χʷ	ħ		
Fricative	voiced	v^{1}		z		ɮ	ʒ	ʑ	ʐ	ʐʷ	ɣ			ʁ	ʁʷ			
Fricative	ejective					ɬʼ			ʂʼ	ʂʷʼ								
Approximant								j				w						
Trill				r														

1. These consonants exist only in borrowed words.
2. In the Black Sea coast Adyghe dialects (e.g. Shapsug dialect and Natukhai dialect) there exist a palatalized voiced velar stop [ɡʲ], a palatalized voiceless velar stop [kʲ] and a palatalized velar ejective [kʲʼ] that were merged with [d͡ʒ], [t͡ʃ] and [t͡ʃʼ] in most Adyghe dialects. For example the Shapsug words "гьанэ" [ɡʲaːna] "shirt", "кьэт" [kʲat] "chicken" and "кӀьапсэ" [kʲʼaːpsa] "rope" are pronounced in other dialects as "джанэ" [d͡ʒaːna], "чэт" [t͡ʃat] and кӀапсэ [t͡ʃʼaːpsa].

In contrast to its large inventory of consonants, Adyghe has only three phonemic vowels in a vertical vowel system.

	Central
Mid	ə
Near-open	ɐ
Open	aː

== Orthography ==
=== Modern alphabet ===
Adyghe alphabet
А а [aː]	Б б [b]	В в [v]	Г г [ɣ]	Гу гу [ɡʷ]	Гъ гъ [ʁ]	Гъу гъу [ʁʷ]	Д д [d]
Дж дж [d͡ʒ]	Дз дз [d͡z]	Дзу дзу [d͡ʐʷ]	Е е [ja/aj]	Ё ё [jo]	Ж ж [ʒ]	Жъ жъ [ʐ]	Жъу жъу [ʐʷ]
Жь жь [ʑ]	З з [z]	И и [jə/əj]	Й й [j]	К к [k]	Ку ку [kʷ]	Къ къ [q]	Къу къу [qʷ]
Кӏ кӏ [t͡ʃʼ]	Кӏу кӏу [kʷʼ]	Л л [ɮ] or [l]	Лъ лъ [ɬ]	Лӏ лӏ [ɬʼ]	М м [m]	Н н [n]	О о [aw/wa]
П п [p]	Пӏ пӏ [pʼ]	Пӏу пӏу [pʷʼ]	Р р [r]	С с [s]	Т т [t]	Тӏ тӏ [tʼ]	Тӏу тӏу [tʷʼ]
У у [w/əw]	Ф ф [f]	Х х [x]	Ху ху [xʷ]	Хъ хъ [χ]	Хъу хъу [χʷ]	Хь хь [ħ]	Ц ц [t͡s]
Цу цу [t͡ʂʷ]	Цӏ цӏ [t͡sʼ]	Ч ч [t͡ʃ]	Чӏ чӏ [t͡ʂʼ]	Чъ чъ [t͡ʂ]	Ш ш [ʃ]	Шъ шъ [ʂ]	Шъу шъу [ʂʷ]
Шӏ шӏ [ʂʼ]	Шӏу шӏу [ʂʷʼ]	Щ щ [ɕ]	Ъ ъ [ˠ]	Ы ы [ə]	Ь ь [ʲ]	Э э [a]	Ю ю [ju]
Я я [jaː]	Ӏ ӏ [ʔ]	Ӏу ӏу [ʔʷ]					

The treatment of the letter palochka varies. Some documents use it as a caseless letter, while others use it as a casing letter.

The Adyghe alphabet contains some inconsistencies between visual representation and pronunciation which can be a point of confusion for learners. It is tempting to read the Circassian alphabet letters phonologically, but this is not always accurate. For example:

- While the letter Кӏ appears to represent [kʼ], it is actually pronounced as [t͡ʃʼ] (ЧӀ).
- Чӏ is pronounced as the retroflex [t͡ʂʼ] (ЧӀъ).
- Цу is pronounced as [t͡ʂʷ] (Чъу).
- Шӏ is pronounced as [ʂʼ] (Шӏъ).
- Шӏу is pronounced as [ʂʷʼ] (Шӏъу).
- The letter Г represents the fricative [ɣ] rather than the stop [ɡ].
- The labialized Гу corresponds to the stop [ɡʷ].

Adyghe Dialectal letters
Гь гь [ɡʲ]	Джь джь [ɡʲ]	Кь кь [kʲ]	Кӏь кӏь [kʲʼ]	Сӏ сӏ [sʼ]	Ӏь ӏь [ʔʲ]

These letters are not part of the official alphabet, but they may appear in books that showcase the different dialects.

=== Other alphabets ===
For most of its history, Adyghe was an oral language. The folklore, particularly the Nart sagas, served as a repository for the language. Widespread literacy in Adyghe did not exist until the modern era and literacy was limited to a few people. From the 6th–5th centuries BC until the first half of the 15th century, the Adyghe people used the Greek alphabet, initially introduced through ancient Greek colonies and later reinforced by the Byzantine Empire and the Christian church. Early forms of the Cyrillic alphabet were also used during this period due to Russian influence. During the 13th to 15th centuries, the development of relations with the Genoese Republic led to some use of the Italian (Latin) script. In the 14th century, along with Islam, the Arabic script was adopted for Adyghe. It was referred to as Ajam, a writing system for the native language based on the Perso-Arabic script. Since Adyghe has many more consonants than Arabic, the Ajam system required adding special diacritical marks or inventing new letters to represent sounds. Early attempts to write Adyghe in modern Cyrillic started as early as 1829 and were followed by similar attempts.

In 1853, the Adyghe educator Umar Bersey published the first "Primer of the Circassian Language" based on the Arabic script. Over the following decades, several authors attempted to further improve the Adyghe Arabic orthography. The most successful attempt was the alphabet created by Akhmetov Bekukh. In this version, letters were designated for vowel sounds, and the orthography was transformed from an "Impure abjads to a true alphabet. In 1918, on the initiative of the Kuban Revolutionary Committee, a primer was published in Yekaterinodar. This official endorsement resulted in a literary boom in Adyghe and the publication of various newspapers, textbooks and other literature, including the Adyghe Maq, the main Adyghe language newspaper established in 1923. During the abovementioned decades, parallel with this process, the Perso-Arabic orthography had also been standardized for the sister Circassian language of Kabardian. Although very similar in many aspects, there were minor variations, in which letters were included based on each respective phonology, and there were minor differences in presentation of a few consonants as well. The Arabic script was used until 1927, when as a part of the Soviet "Latinisation" campaign, a Latin-based alphabet was adopted. It was developed by the linguist N.F. Yakovlev and the Adyghe scholar Daud Ashkhamaf. In the late 1930s, the script was converted to Cyrillic to align with Russian.

In the diaspora, a new Latin alphabet based on the Turkish alphabet was designed to better facilitate Adyghe and Kabardian education in Turkey, named the ABX alphabet.

== Grammar ==
Adyghe, like all Northwest Caucasian languages, has a basic subject–object–verb typology and is characterised by the ergative construction of sentences.

== Status ==
=== Republic of Adygea ===
Adyghe is indigenous to the Republic of Adygea, a federal subject of the Russian Federation. The contemporary distribution of Adyghe speakers was largely established during the 19th-century Russo-Circassian War, which resulted in the Russian Empire's conquest of the region and the Circassian Genocide, which included the mass killing and forced deportation or flight of the majority of the Circassian population to the Ottoman Empire. Following this displacement, imperial authorities resettled the remaining Circassian population into compact rural villages (auls) situated along the left banks of the Kuban and Laba rivers. Conversely, urban centers such as Maykop were largely populated by Russian colonists. According to official census data, over 100,000 indigenous Circassians reside in the Republic of Adygea, where they account for approximately 20% of the republic's total population. The language is concentrated primarily in rural auls, which make up about 19% of all settlements in Adygea. In contrast, in the capital city of Maykop, Circassians constitute 20% of the city's 140,000 residents, with ethnic Russians forming the majority.

The sociolinguistic hierarchy between Adyghe and Russian was significantly shaped by Soviet and post-Soviet nationality policies. During the 1920s and early 1930s, the Soviet policy of korenizatsiya initially promoted the development of minority languages, including Adyghe. However, from the mid-1930s onward, official state policy shifted toward Russification. Compulsory Russian-language instruction was introduced in 1938. Educational reforms in 1958–1959 allowed parents to select the language of instruction for their children, however in practice many had to choose Russian-medium schooling due to its economic advantages and prestige as the primary language of administration, science, and higher education. This resulted in "linguistic nihilism" or indifference toward the native language. Following the dissolution of the Soviet Union, the status of Adyghe was symbolically elevated under the 1994 Law on Languages of the Peoples of Adygea, which designated Adyghe as an official state language of the republic alongside Russian, though implementation in governmental administrative domains remained limited in practice. In neighboring administrative divisions with indigenous Circassian populations, such as Krasnodar Krai, the language lacks official state status or legal protection. Federal law establishes Russian as the sole mandatory state language throughout the entirety of the Russian Federation. Learning Russian is compulsory for all citizens, whereas non-Russian regional languages are classified as optional secondary choices, creating a legal hierarchy favoring Russian over indigenous languages. Statutory amendments removed foundational clauses guaranteeing "language sovereignty" from regional legal frameworks. Increased political centralization in Russia since the 2000s has curtailed regional language promotion. In 2018, amendments to the Russian Federal Law on Education made the teaching of regional state languages such as Adyghe completely optional, and academic subjects remain taught exclusively in Russian. Following the passage of this amendment, schools in urban areas such as Maykop eliminated introductory Adyghe classes previously offered to non-Circassian pupils, leading to increased ethnolinguistic segmentation and further preassure on Circassian students in the school enrollment. Local sociolinguists and scholars classify Adyghe as endangered under current demographic and legal pressures. Revisions to regional language legislation also eliminated the statutory right of scholars and graduate students to write or defend Master's and doctoral dissertations in the Adyghe language, requiring all higher academic degree defenses to be conducted solely in Russian.

In cities like Maykop, Russian serves as the default language of public life, business, and daily service encounter. Adyghe usage is largely restricted to private home settings or specific family networks. Historically, older generations experienced public shaming or social pressure when speaking Adyghe in Maykop. Most of the Republic has a Russian population; and social norms regarding politeness around non-speakers often discourage Adyghe usage. As a consequence, urban children are exposed predominantly to Russian in schools, peer groups, and public settings, resulting in language shift toward Russian. Historically, rural auls functioned as primary strongholds for Adyghe language preservation and transmission, where native language use was a cultural norm. However, this has weakened in recent decades^{.} Shifts in family cohabitation patterns, combined with the widespread adoption of Russian-medium smartphones, digital media, television, and online gaming, have accelerated children's exposure to Russian even in ethnically homogeneous auls. In larger villages, children increasingly demonstrate higher fluency in Russian than in Adyghe. Institutions such as the Adyghe Republican Institute for Humanitarian Research have worked to increase the visual presence of Adyghe in Maykop. Initiatives include street banners and outdoor signs installed in public areas featuring untranslated Adyghe proverbs, such as "Language is the soul of a nation" (Бзэр цӀыф лъэпкъым ыпс) and "If the language disappears, the people disappear", to publicly reinforce language legitimacy. Grassroots initiatives in Maykop include private art studios conducting instruction in Adyghe and the creation of cultural institutions such as the Tame ("Wing") ethnic school, established in 2025 to teach language alongside traditional crafts and arts. Additionally, seasonal immersion projects have been established, including the Si Nan ("My Mom") ethno-camp in rural auls and the Adygland youth camp organized by regional academic bodies to recreate immersive Adyghe-speaking environments. In 2019, the government of Adygea formed a Council on the Adyghe Language and a dedicated Project Office for Preserving the Adyghe Language.

In 2000, prominent Circassian linguists formulated a unified Circassian alphabet designed to bridge the "Western and Eastern dialects" (Adyghe and Kabardian). Although approved across academic conferences and submitted to the regional parliaments of Adygea, Kabardino-Balkaria, and Karachay-Cherkessia, the unified alphabet was never enacted into law. Debates persist regarding a transition to a Roman-based orthography to align with the Circassian diaspora in Turkey, though logistical and legal constraints remain a major hurdle: a 2004 ruling by the Constitutional Court of Russia legally prohibited the adoption of non-Cyrillic scripts for state languages within the Russian Federation. Efforts to support language preservation through the repatriation of the diaspora also faces legal hurdles: Russian federal legislation governing foreign "compatriots" requires individuals seeking resettlement in their historic homeland to demonstrate proficiency in the Russian language, regardless of their indigenous Caucasian descent.

=== Turkey ===
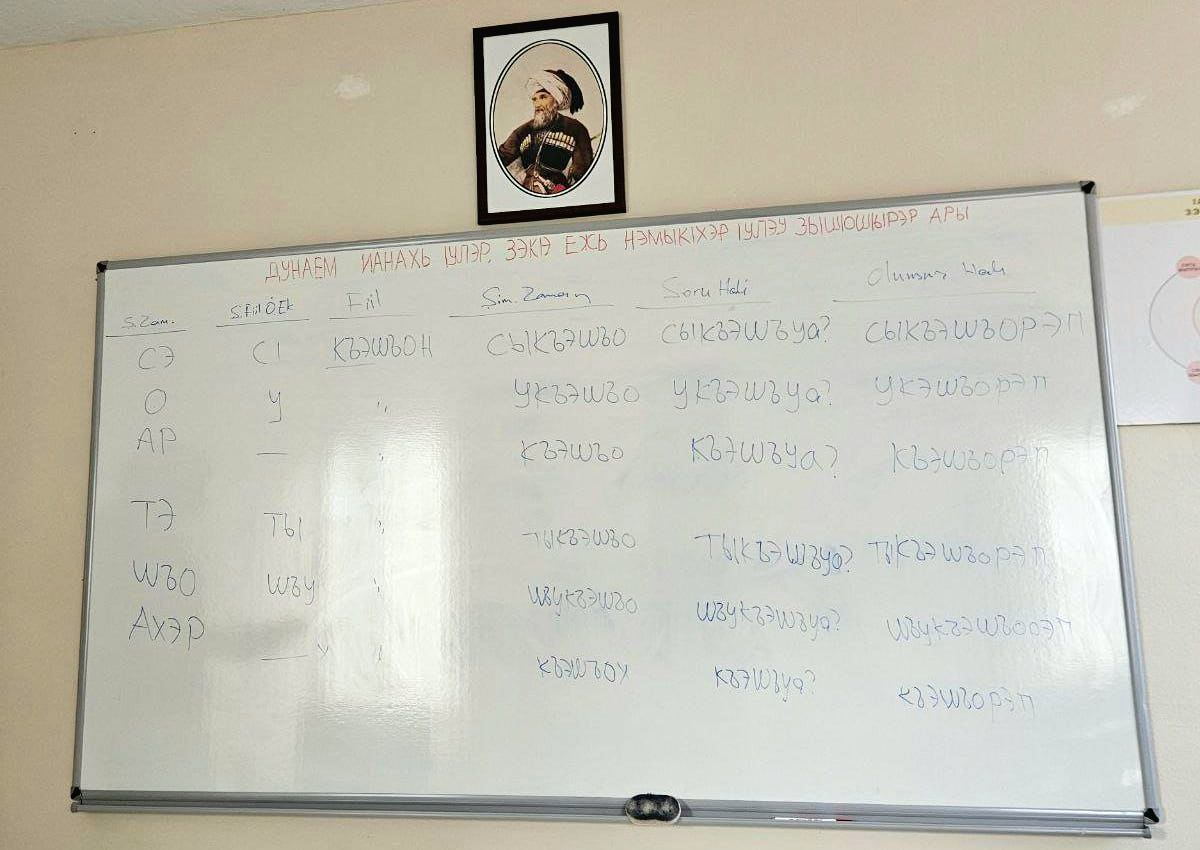
An Adyghe language class in Turkey. The board shows the verb къэшъон (to dance), in present tense.

Turkey hosts the largest Circassian population, but the language lacks any legal recognition since 1923. Following the 1864 exodus from Circassia, Circassians integrated into the Ottoman imperial structure through military recruitment, administrative roles, and royal household ties. Unlike the republican period, the Ottoman Empire allowed and supported Circassian language schools, including schools teaching only in Adyghe; historically, the first Adyghe language education in the diaspora occurred in Istanbul; the "Circassian Benevolence School" (1910) and the "Circassian Girls Model School" (1919) provided instruction, followed by the Circassian Sample School (1920), a private school that used Circassian as its primary medium of instruction. However, after the collapse of the Ottoman Empire and the establishment of the modern republic, these schools were strictly banned by the Kemalists. During the Turkish War of Independence, early Republican leaders initially framed national unity around an alliance of multi-ethnic Muslim groups, including Turks, Circassians, Kurds, and Laz. However, from the mid-1920s onward, state ideology transitioned toward a mononational, ethnic definition of Turkish identity. Circassians as a whole were also blamed for the actions of Çerkes Ethem and seen as a problematic minority. Following the establishment of the Republic of Turkey, the Adyghe language underwent a rapid shift toward Turkish.

The "Citizen, Speak Turkish!" campaign and the closure of Circassian schools, the language was banned in public and confined to the home. In educational settings, speaking Adyghe was strictly banned. Students faced physical punishment and psychological alienation for speaking Adyghe, including during recess and outside of school grounds. To enforce this, teachers formed "discipline committees" made up of student informants. Publishing in the language also faced state pressure; cultural magazines had to remove Circassian lyrics from traditional songs and publish only the musical notes to avoid government retribution. In many cases, parents worried their children might be subject to racism, and in order to ensure their future, chose to not teach them the language. Circassian elders in Sinop who were interviewed reported that they were afraid to speak the language because they could be accused of being a rebel. They also stated that whenever they spoke Adyghe in schools, they received monetary penalties, the practice reportedly continued into the 1950s. Consequently, while the older generation retains fluency, proficiency among those under 50 is significantly diminished. In a study, Nusret Baş (Бажь Нусрэт), the then-president of the Federation of Circassian Associations, estimated that about 5% of Circassians in Turkey (including self-proclaimed Turks of Circassian descent) speak their native language fluently. A field study found that many middle-aged Circassians in Turkey who do not speak the Adyghe are still able to understand it, but can not respond back in it. Those who can neither speak nor understand the language speak Turkish; but sometimes they add some basic Adyghe words and phrases in their speech.

For much of the 20th century, older generations within the Circassian diaspora maintained what scholars term the "silence of the guest" (misafir sessizliği). This self-silencing was further reinforced by what community members describe as a "guest mentality", that Circassians are temporary guests and thus can not complain as the host may punish them. Elders reported trying to "unlearn Circassian". Due to refugee insecurity and the memory of exile, elders fearfully avoided political friction or language rights advocacy out of anxiety that public visibility might invite state hostility or re-displacement. Beginning in the 1990s, a major ideological shift occurred among younger Circassian activists and intellectuals. Rejecting the "cautious guest" paradigm, contemporary activists framed the community not as refugees eternally indebted to the host state, but as a distinct, diaspora ethnicity entitled to full constitutional equality. To justify their claims to equal status, Circassian activists adopted and reinterpreted the Turkish nationalist trope of the "military nation", arguing that Circassians are, just like Turks, a "founding element" (kurucu unsur) of the modern Republic, as they paid their settlement "debt" in blood through extensive military service and heavy casualties in Ottoman and Republican conflicts, including Gallipoli and the War of Independence. By framing their historical contributions as foundational to the survival of the state, activists argue that:

- Circassians hold equal rights with ethnic Turks not as a concession, but as a historical right earned through sacrifice.
- State recognition of cultural identity, native-language broadcasting, and state-funded mother-tongue education in Adyghe are fundamental democratic rights rather than acts of ungratefulness.

Significant changes occurred following Turkey's European Union accession process in the early 2000s. The language policy was liberalized, which prompted revival efforts. In 2012, the Ministry of National Education introduced "Living Languages and Dialects" as an elective course for secondary schools, allowing Adyghe to be taught in public schools. Classes are only opened if a set minimum number of students apply, and bureaucratic hurdles regarding application windows often hinder access to these classes. Teachers are subject teachers with basic language skills rather than trained philologists, and they receive limited training in language pedagogy. Educational materials are imported from Adygea and are designed for native speakers, making them difficult to adapt for diaspora students who are learning Adyghe as a second language. During the COVID-19 pandemic, transnational online courses were organized in collaboration with institutions in Russia, allowing students in Turkey, Jordan, and Germany to be taught by teachers directly from the Caucasus. Düzce University has a Department of Caucasian Languages and Cultures, which offers "Circassian Language and Culture" programs, including the teaching of Adyghe in Cyrillic, as the surrounding region is inhabited largely by Shapsug and Abzakh Circassians. Boğaziçi University began offering elective Adyghe courses in 2013.

A significant debate persists in the Turkish diaspora regarding orthography of Adyghe. The Federation of Caucasian Associations (KAFFED) adopted the Cyrillic alphabet in 2004 to maintain continuity with the homeland, but other groups advocate for a Latin-based script to facilitate easier learning for Turkish speakers. This dispute intensified significantly when the Turkish Ministry of Education approved a Latin-based alphabet, called the ABX Latin Alphabet, for elective Circassian language courses in public schools, effectively creating a dual-alphabet system alongside the existing Cyrillic curriculum. KAFFED vehemently opposed this decision, arguing that it creates confusion and severs cultural ties with the autonomous republics in the Caucasus. Demonstrations were at Ministry of Education offices across the country with slogans including "Hands off my alphabet," "We want our mother tongue's alphabet" and "How does Arabic in Latin letters sound?".

The Ubykh people in Turkey, who originally possessed their own distinct language, largely integrated with the Adyghe during their exile and adopted the Adyghe language as their own. Ubykh language went extinct in 1992; today Ubykh people speak Adyghe or Turkish.

Adyghe State University is working to document Adyghe language and folklore in Turkey.

Linguistically, the Adyghe spoken in Turkey exhibits distinct features as it was not subject to the standardisation policies in the Caucasus. It contains archaic vocabulary lost in the Caucasus, alongside Turkish loanwords. While the Chemguy dialect forms the basis of the literary language in the Republic of Adygea, the majority of the diaspora in Turkey speaks the Abzakh and Shapsug dialects (as well as Kabardian), alongside smaller numbers of Bzhedug and Hatuqay speakers. The Hatuqay dialect is spoken only in Turkey. In some cases, the physical mixing of different tribes led to dialectal convergence. Frequent intermarriages between dialect groups led to the use of a mixed Adyghe koine or the dominance of one dialect in multi-tribal areas. In some cases, the boundaries between dialects became blurred, resulting in a hybrid oral communication style, sometimes even including hybrids with Kabardian or Abaza. Due to assimilation, Adyghe speakers in Turkey sometimes use Turkish terms for numbers, days of the week, months, and colors.

=== Israel ===
The Circassian community in Israel, concentrated in the Circassian towns of Kfar Kama and Rehaniya, is considered to have one of the highest levels of language maintenance in the diaspora. Adyghe serves as the language of daily communication in the home, school, and public spaces. In 1958-1959, Israeli Circassians made contact for the first time with Circassians in the Caucasus and requested literary material in Adyghe, which they received. In 1976, the Adyghe language was introduced into the official school curriculum. It is a compulsory subject from 6th grade onward, and utilizes textbooks based on the literary standard of the Republic of Adygea. Despite the dominance of the Shapsug dialect in speech, the written language taught in schools utilizes the Cyrillic alphabet and the Chemguy-based literary standard. Kfar Kama is inhabited by the Shapsug tribe, while Rihaniya is inhabited by the Abzakh tribe. The Israeli variety of Adyghe also contains unique neologisms.

Even in diaspora communities with highly preserved spoken fluency, such as the compact Circassian settlements in Israel, literacy is a significant challenge; one survey showed that while 81.7% of respondents had advanced speaking proficiency, only 12% reported writing proficiency.

=== Jordan ===
In Jordan, the Adyghe language has historically enjoyed a relatively privileged status, though it currently faces significant pressure, as Arabic has become the dominant language for the younger generation, and the Adyghe language is often restricted to symbolic functions or domestic use. Consequently, Adyghe in Jordan serves more as a folkloric marker of identity than a functional tool for daily communication. The Adyghe language in Jordan is currently classified as severely endangered due to a rapid disruption in intergenerational transmission. The decline of the language was triggered by migration, urbanization, and the dispersion of the Circassian population among the Arabic-speaking majority. For example, the expansion of Amman in the early 1900s transformed predominantly Circassian farming villages into diverse urban centres inhabited by Arabs, causing Circassians to become a minority in their original settlements. Today, Arabic has almost entirely ousted Circassian as the primary language of communication within the home. Surveys indicate that 21% of children use Circassian at home. Because schools historically used Arabic as the sole medium of instruction, Circassian parents began speaking Arabic at home to ensure their children would not struggle academically.

Adyghe is taught in Prince Hamza Ibn Al-Hussein Secondary School, a school for Jordanian Circassians in Jordan's capital city of Amman. This school, established by Circassians with support from King Hussein of Jordan, is one of the first schools for the Adyghe communities outside Circassia. It has around 750 Jordanian Adyghe students, and aims to preserve the Adyghe language and traditions among future generations. The diaspora in Jordan has produced dictionaries and linguistic works, such as a Circassian-Arabic dictionary published in 1988. The Circassian Charity Association of Jordan also sponsors a school between Naur and Wadi Al-Seer that teaches the language. Historically, various dialects were spoken by immigrants, including Shapsug, Bzhedug, (and Kabardian), but over time these dialects have merged.

=== Syria ===
Historically, the Golan Heights served as a centre for Circassian language preservation prior to the 1967 war. In the 1920s and 1930s, the "Circassian Society of Education and Union" in Quneitra published the newspaper Mardj in Circassian (using the Latin script), Arabic, and French, and established a school that taught the language alongside general subjects. In the late 20th century, the Circassian Charity Association in Damascus operated informal language circles to teach the Cyrillic script and preserve oral traditions. However, the language has declined due to the lack of state-supported education and the dominance of Arabic in all public spheres. After the Syrian defeat in the war, the Circassian population largely fled the Golan Heights region, which was occupied by the Israeli Army. Many of Syria's ethnic Circassians have left the country and have settled in Turkey or Europe, while some of them repatriated to Adygea, Kabardino-Balkaria and Karachay-Cherkessia, as well as to partially recognised Republic of Abkhazia.

=== United States ===
The Circassian American community is multilingual, speaking languages including English, Circassian (Adyghe, Kabardian), and Arabic. However, the community is currently experiencing a significant language shift away from their ethnic Adyghe language and toward English. English is the dominant language used in almost all public and social domains, utilized universally in the workplace and overwhelmingly with neighbors, non-Circassian friends, and even among Circassian peers. The Adyghe language remains preserved primarily within the home, specifically in intergenerational communication. Circassian is predominantly spoken by the elder members of the community and is the primary language used when younger generations address their grandparents, representing over 52% of these interactions. A study found that a large majority of the New Jersey Circassian community (81.5%) agrees that learning the Circassian language is essential for maintaining their ethnic identity. However, some Circassian Americans have abandoned Adyghe fluency as redundant, focusing instead on Adyghe Khabze, traditional dances and folklore. The Circassian Benevolent Association (CBA) hosts a Sunday school where volunteers teach the Circassian language.

In recent years, growing political pressure and the criminalization of civil society initiatives in Russia have forced many scholars and language activists to relocate, shifting the epicenter of Circassian language activism and cultural preservation to countries abroad, including the United States.

=== Caucasus vs Diaspora Adyghe ===
Following the Circassian Genocide and expulsion in 1864, the majority of Adyghe speakers were scattered across the Ottoman Empire. The language spoken in the diaspora has diverged from the literary forms in the Caucasus. Diaspora communities often use Arabic or Turkish loanwords where the literary language uses Russian ones.

The linguistic divergence between the Adyghe language spoken in the historical homeland and the language spoken by the diaspora, particularly in Turkey and the Middle East, is the result of over a century and a half of isolated development. This isolation, combined with the mixing of various dialects and the strong influence of local languages like Turkish and Arabic, led to significant phonetic, lexical, and semantic differences.

Some native Adyghe words acquired entirely new meanings in the diaspora. The word гу, which historically means "wagon" or "cart" in the literary language, has evolved to mean "automobile" or "car" among diaspora speakers. Similarly, the word ин (big) is used in the diaspora to refer to an "elder," replacing the literary term нэхъыжь.

English	Adyghe (West Circassian)	
English	Diaspora	Literary Standard
Car	ку (Originally meaning "wagon/cart")	машинэ (Russian loanword)
Elder	ин (Meaning "big", possibly a semantic loan from Turkish "büyük")	нахъыжъ (Native term)

Due to influence of the Russian language, Russian loanwords in standard Adyghe are left exactly as is and not adapted to the language in terms of spelling or pronouncation. However, in the diaspora, the pronouncations are adapted to fit the Adyghe language:

English	Adyghe (West Circassian)	
English	Diaspora Usage	Caucasus Usage
Computer	компутер	компьютер
Potato	къартIоф	картоф
Medallion	мадалйон	медальон
Government	хьыкумэт	правительств
Exam	Ӏимтыхьэн	экзамен
Electricity lamp	Ӏэлэктирик остыгъ	электрическэ остыгъ
Wagon	уагон	вагон

In addition to native terms, there are Turkish loanwords that do not exist in literary Adyghe, which are occasionally used alongside native equivalents:

English	Adyghe (West Circassian)		Turkish
English	Diaspora (Loanword; diaspora only)	Native equivalent (Also used in diaspora)	Turkish
Construction	иншыхьэт	гъэпсыгъэ	inşaat
Goodbye ("We leave you to God")	Алыхьсмэлэдыкъ	Тхьэм шъукъегъэгъун	Allah'a ısmarladık
More	дэхьэ	нахь	daha
Province	уилает	къедзыгъо	vilayet
State	долэт	къэралыгъо	devlet
I swear (filler)	уэлахьэ-билахьэ	-	vallahi billahi

In diaspora variants of the Adyghe language, internationalisms have been borrowed via Turkish or other languages, thus differ slightly from literary Adyghe which borrowed them from Russian:

English	Adyghe (West Circassian)		Turkish	Russian
English	Diaspora	Literary Standard	Turkish	Russian
American	Амэрикэн	Американ	Amerikan	Американец
Europe	Аурупэ	Европэ	Avrupa	Европа
Cigarette	джыкъарэ	сигаретэ	sigara	сигарета
Japan	Жапон	Японие	Japonya	Япония
High school	лисэ	лицей	lise	лицей
Furniture	мобилие	мебель	mobilya	мебель
Bus	отобюс	aвтобус	otobüs	автобус
Television	телевизион	телевизор	televizyon	телевизор

Turkish linguistic influence led to the creation of calques (literal translations) for modern concepts. In some extreme cases, diaspora speakers even attach Turkish grammatical suffixes, such as the past tense -miş or the subjunctive -dı, directly to Adyghe roots, though native speakers often recognize these constructions as "non-Adyghe".

English	Diaspora Adyghe	Linguistic Mechanism	Turkish Influence
But (filler)	ӏамэ	Conjunction	ama
Already / Anyway (filler)	затэн	Adverb / Particle	zaten
Maybe (filler)	бэлки	Adverb / Particle	belki
That is (filler)	яни	Conjunction	yani
To make a phone call	телефон шIын	Calque	telefon etmek
To send a message / SMS	месаж егъэхьын	Calque	mesaj göndermek
"If only"	-ды	Grammatical suffix	-dı (attached to native root)

While the spoken and folkloric language of the diaspora evolved independently, this isolation has begun to diminish. With the advent of the internet and social media, the younger and middle generations in the diaspora are increasingly interacting with the Cyrillic-based literary language of the homeland. This exposure is initiating a slow but inevitable "literaturization" of the diaspora's language, gradually aligning their written and official communication with the literary standard.

When conversing in Turkish, diaspora Circassians frequently embed native Adyghe terms to refer to specific traditional and unique cultural conventions, or use them as in-group slang.

Term / Name	Diaspora Usage
Kabze / Habze (хабзэ)	Traditional etiquette or customs; commonly embedded into everyday Turkish conversation.
Vâse (уасэ)	Bridewealth; retained in Turkish speech to denote a specific cultural practice.
Unafe (унафэ)	Council meetings or community decisions.
Lepako (лъэпаку)	Used specifically to refer to a Turk.
Sigoş (сикъош)	Literally "my brother", commonly used as "mate, pal" among North Caucasians while conversing in Turkish.
Deju (дэжъыу)	Literally "chorus together". Tongue twisters and encouragements yelled by bystanders to hype up dancers and musicians.

== Vocabulary ==
Besides native vocabulary, the Adyghe language has accepted some loanwords from Turkic, Arabic, Persian, Russian and other languages. The appearance of Turkic loanwords in the Adyghe language can be dated to the 14th century due to interactions with the Golden Horde and Crimean Khanate. By the mid-19th century; Arabic words had begun to enter the language. Words such as chapych (kopeck) are pre-revolutionary loans from Russian. In old borrowings, as a rule, the phonetic composition of borrowed words was adapted to the phonological system of the Adyghe language.

=== Native vocabulary ===
Cyrillic	ABX Latin	IPA	Translation
сэ	se	[sɐ]	I
пшъашъэ	pşaşe	[p͡ʂaːʂɐ]	girl
тӀыс	ṫıs	[tʼəs]	to sit
тэдж	tec	[tɐd͡ʒ]	to stand
Тэу ущыт?	Tew wışıt?	[tɐw‿wəʃət]	How are you?
СышӀу.	Sışü'ı.	[səʃʷʼ]	I'm fine.
шы	şı	[ʃə]	horse
щы	şı	[ɕə]	three
жъуагъо	jüağo	[ʐʷaːʁʷɐ]	star
тыгъэ	tığe	[təʁɐ]	sun
мазэ	maze	[maːzɐ]	moon
цуакъэ	çüake	[t͡sʷaːqɐ]	shoe
шъукъеблагъ	şükéblağ	[ʂʷəqɐjblaːʁ]	welcome
лъэхъуамбэ	ĺeḣoámbe	[ɬɐχʷaːmbɐ]	toe
хьамлыу	hamlıw	[ħaːmləw]	worm
кӀэнкӀэ	ćenće	[kʼɐŋkʼɐ]	egg
хьампӀырашъу	hamṕıraşü	[ħaːmpʼəraːʂʷ]	butterfly
мэшӀоку	meşü'eḱu	[mɐʃʷʼɐkʷ]	train
пхъэтӀэкӀу	pḣeṫequ	[p͡χɐtʼɐkʷʼ]	chair
тхьэлӀыкӀо	theĺ'ıqo	[t͡ħaːɬəkʷʼɐ]	prophet
къамзэгу	kamzegu	[qaːmzɐɡʷ]	ant
псычэт	psıçet	[p͡sət͡ʃɐt]	duck

=== Example loanwords ===
Cyrillic	ABX Latin	IPA	Translation	Etymology
республикэ	réspubliḱe	[rʲespublʲikɐ]	republic	From Latin rēs pūblica ('public concern') via Russian республика.
компутер	ḱomputér	[komputʲer]	computer	From Latin computāre ('to settle together') via Russian компьютер.
математикэ	matématiḱe	[maːtʲemaːtʲikɐ]	mathematics	From Ancient Greek μάθημα máthēma ('study, knowledge') via Russian математика.
спорт	sport	[sport]	sports	From English sport via Russian спорт.
быракъ	bırak	[bəraːq]	flag	Ultimately from Proto-Turkic *badrak ('spear; stick').
къартӀоф	karṫof	[qaːrtʷʼɐf]	potato	From German Kartoffel ('potato') via Russian картофель.
томат	tomat	[tomaːt]	tomato	From Spanish tomate, which in turn derives from Nahuan tomatl, via Russian томат.
орэндж	werenc	[wɐrɐnd͡ʒ]	orange	From Persian نارنگ nârang or نارنج nâranj.
нэмаз	nemaz	[nɐmaːz]	salah (Islamic praying)	From Persian نماز namâz.
къалэ	kale	[qaːlɐ]	city	Akkadian kalakku ('fort').
дунай	dunay	[dəwnaːj]	earth	From Arabic دنيا dunyā ('world').

== Sample texts ==
=== Al-Fatiha الفَاتِحَةِ ===
Adyghe in Cyrillic script

(Mashbash & Koshbaev)

1. Алахьэу гукӀэгъушӀэу, гукӀэгъу зыхэлъым ыцӀэкӀэ!
2. Зэрэдунае и Тхьэу Алахьым щытхъур ыдэжь,
3. ГукӀэгъушӀэу, гукӀэгъу зыхэлъэу,
4. Пщынэжь мафэр зиӀэмырым!
5. Шъхьащэ тэ къыпфэтэшӀы, тыолъэӀу О ӀэпыӀэгъу укъытфэхъунэу!
6. Гъогу занкӀэм О тырыщ,
7. ШӀу О зыфэпшӀагъэхэм ягъогу нахь, губж лъэш зыфэпшӀыгъэхэр зытетхэр арэп, гъощагъэхэр зытетхэри арэп.

Adyghe in ABX Latin Script

(Used by Turkish Ministry of Education)

1. Alahew gućeğuş'ew, gućeğu' zıxeĺım ıšeće!
2. Zeredunaye yi Thew Alahım şıtḣur ıdej,
3. Gućeğuş'ew, gućeğu' zıxeĺew,
4. Pşınej mafer ziemırım!
5. Şhaşe te kıpfeteş'ı, tıweĺeu We epıeğu' wıkıtfeḣunew!
6. Ğogu zanćem We tırış,
7. Şü'ı We zıfepş'ağexem yağogu nah, gubj ĺeş zıfepş'ığexer zıtétxer arep, ğoşağexer zıtétxeri arep.

Adyghe in Perso-Arabic Script

(Historical)

۱. الله‌ەو ݝوڃەغوضەو، ݝوڃەغو ز‍ہ‍ݗەݪ‍ہ‍یم ئیڗەڃە!
۲. زەرەدونایە ئی تحەو آلاح‍ہ‍م ش‍ہ‍تخور ئ‍ہ‍دەژ،
۳. ݝوڃەغوضەو، ݝوڃەغو ز‍ہ‍ݗەݪەو،
۴. پش‍ہ‍نەژ مافەر زیئەم‍ہ‍ر‍ہ‍م!
۵. صحاشە تە ق‍ہ‍پفەتەض‍ہ‍، ت‍ہ‍ئۆݪەؤ ئۆ ائەپ‍ہ‍ئەغو ئوق‍ہ‍تفەخونەو!
۶. غۆݝو زانڃەم ئۆ ت‍ہ‍ر‍ہ‍ش،
۷. ضو ئۆ ز‍ہ‍فەپضاغەݗەم یاغۆݝو ناح، ݝوبڒ ݪەس̈ ز‍ہ‍فەپض‍ہ‍غەݗەر ز‍ہ‍تیەتݗەر آرەپ، غۆشاغەݗەر ز‍ہ‍تیەتݗەری آرەپ.

English

(Dr. Musharraf Hussain)

1. In the name of God, the Kind, the Caring.
2. All praises are for God, the Lord of the worlds.
3. The Kind, the Caring,
4. the Master of Judgement Day.
5. We worship You alone and from You alone we seek help.
6. Guide us on the straight path,
7. the path of those You favoured, not those who are condemned nor
the misguided ones.

=== John 1:1–5 ===
Adyghe in Cyrillic script

1. УблапӀэм ыдэжь ГущыӀэр щыӀагъ. Ар Тхьэм ыдэжь щыӀагъ, а ГущыӀэри Тхьэу арыгъэ.
2. УблапӀэм щегъэжьагъэу а ГущыӀэр Тхьэм ыдэжь щыӀагъ.
3. Тхьэм а ГущыӀэм зэкӀэри къыригъэгъэхъугъ. Тхьэм къыгъэхъугъэ пстэуми ащыщэу а ГущыӀэм къыримыгъгъэхъугъэ зи щыӀэп.
4. МыкӀодыжьын щыӀэныгъэ а ГущыӀэм хэлъыгъ, а щыӀэныгъэри цӀыфхэм нэфынэ афэхъугъ.
5. Нэфынэр шӀункӀыгъэм щэнэфы, шӀункӀыгъэри нэфынэм текӀуагъэп.

Adyghe in ABX Latin Script

(Used by Turkish Ministry of Education)

1. Wıblaṕem ıdej Guşıer şıaáğ. Ar Them ıdej şıaáğ, a Guşıeri Thew arığe.
2. Wıblaṕem şéğejağew a Guşıer Them ıdej şıaáğ.
3. Them a Guşıem zećeri kıriğeğeḣuğ. Them kığeḣuğe pstewmi aşışew a Guşıem kırimığğeḣuğe zi şıep.
4. Mıqodıjın şıenığe a Guşıem xeĺığ, a şıenığeri šıfxem nefıne afeḣuğ.
5. Nefıner şü'ınćığem şenefı, şü'ınćığeri nefınem téqoáğep.

Adyghe in Perso-Arabic Script

(Historical)

۱. ئوبلاࢠەم ئ‍ہ‍دەژ ݝوش‍ہ‍ئەر ش‍ہئ‍اغ. آر تحەم ئ‍ہ‍دەژ ش‍ہئ‍اغ، آ ݝوش‍ہ‍ئەری تحەو آر‍ہ‍غە.
۲. ئوبلاࢠەم شیەغەژاغەو آ ݝوش‍ہ‍ئەر تحەم ئ‍ہ‍دەژ ش‍ہئ‍اغ.
۳. تحەم آ ݝوش‍ہ‍ئەم زەݗەری ق‍ہ‍ریغەغەخوغ. تحەم ق‍ہ‍غەخوغە پستەومی آش‍ہ‍شەو آ ݝوش‍ہ‍ئەم ق‍ہ‍ریم‍ہ‍غّەخوغە زی ش‍ہئ‍ەپ.
۴. م‍ہ‍ڃۆد‍ہ‍ژ‍ہ‍ن ش‍ہئەن‍ہ‍غە آ ݝوش‍ہ‍ئەم ݗەݪ‍ہ‍غ، آ ش‍ہئەن‍ہ‍غەری ڗ‍ہ‍فݗەم نەف‍ہ‍نە آفەخوغ.
۵. نەف‍ہ‍نەر ضونڃ‍ہ‍غەم شەنەفی، ضونڃ‍ہ‍غەری نەف‍ہ‍نەم تەࢰواغەپ.

English translation

1. In the beginning was the Word, and the Word was with God, and the Word was a god.
2. This one was in the beginning with God.
3. All things came into existence through him, and apart from him not even one thing came into existence.
4. What has come into existence by means of him was life, and the life was the light of men.
5. And the light is shining in the darkness, but the darkness has not overpowered it.

=== Universal Declaration of Human Rights ===
UDHR in Adyghe	Adyghe in ABX Latin Script (Used by Turkish Ministry of Education)	Adyghe in Perso-Arabic Script (Historical)	IPA	English translation
ЦӀыф пстэури шъхьэфитэу, ялъытэныгъэрэ яфэшъуашэхэмрэкӀэ зэфэдэу къалъфы. Акъылрэ зэхэшӀыкӀ гъуазэрэ яӀэшъы, зыр зым зэкъош зэхашӀэ азфагу дэлъэу зэфыщытынхэ фае.	Šıf pstewri şhefitew, yaĺıtenığere yafeşüaşexemreće zefedew kaĺfı. Akılre zexeş'ıć ğuazere yaeşı, zır zım zekoş zexaş'e azfagu deĺew zefışıtınxe faye.	ڗ‍ہف پستەوری صحەفیتەو، یاݪہتەنہغەرە یافەصواس̈ەݗەمرەڃەڗیف پستەوری صحەفیتەو، یاݪہتەنہغەرە یافەصواس̈ەݗەمرەڃە زەفەدەو قاݪفہ‍. آقہلرە زەݗەضہڃ غوازەرە یائەصہ‍، ز‍ہر ز‍ہم زەقۆس̈ زەڃاضە آزفاگو دەݪەو زەفہشہتہنڃە فایە.	[t͡sʼəf pstawərəj ʂ͡ħafəjtawə jaːɬətanəʁara jaːfaʂʷaːʃaxamrat͡ʃʼa zafadawə qaːɬfə aqəɮra zaxaʃʼət͡ʃʼ ʁʷaːzara jaːʔaʃə zər zəm zaqʷaʃ azfaːgʷ daɬawə zafəɕətənxa faːja]	All human beings are born free and equal in dignity and rights. They are endowed with reason and conscience and should act towards one another in a spirit of brotherhood.

=== Sample text from the Adyghe Mawlid ===
The Adyghe Mawlid is written in the Shapsug dialect, with a very large number of Arabic, Turkish Persian loanwords. The original publication utilized a modified Arabic/Ottoman alphabet, incorporating specialized marks and letters to represent unique Circassian phonemes that do not exist in standard Ottoman Turkish. Poetically, the translation remains highly faithful to Süleyman Çelebi's original structure. It consists of 1,034 lines (517 couplets) and strictly adheres to the classical remel meter (fâilâtun fâilâtun fâilun).

Adyghe in Cyrillic script

(Shapsug dialect with Ottoman loanwords)

ГIэшкъыгье зэ жэгье Аллахь къэтэгъаIу
Дэрдыгье хигь тигугье Iаахь къэтэгъаIу.

Тыщыгугъун игучIэгъу Ар падишахь,
Ар Керимэу Ар Рахьыймэу Ар Iилахь.

Зэрэзэм Ащ изэкъуагъэм шек хэлъэп
Зыгъэзакъор джыхьэнэмым илъынэп.

ГъэшIыгъэхэр щымыIахэу ар щыIагъ,
ГъэшIыгъэмэ афэлъагэу Ар щыIагъ.

Ар зыщэIэм щыIэгъагъэп цIыф мелек,
Уашъуи чIыгуий мази тыгъий зикI фелек.

Ащ ыужым гъэшIыгъэхэр къыгъэшIыгъ
ФэпщылIыным фэшIыхэгье къыгъэшIыгъ.

Adyghe in ABX Latin Script

(Used by Turkish Ministry of Education)

Ǵeşkıǵé ze jeǵé Allah keteğau
Derdıǵé xiǵ tiguǵé aáah keteğau.

Tışıguğun yigućeğu' Ar padişah,
Ar Ḱérimew Ar Rahıymew Ar ilah.

Zerezem Aş yizekoáğem şéḱ xeĺep
Zığezakor cıhenemım yiĺınep.

Ğeş'ığexer şımıaáxew ar şıaáğ,
Ğeş'ığeme afeĺaǵew Ar şıaáğ.

Ar zışeem şıeğağep šıf méléḱ,
Waşüi ćıguyiy mazi tığyiy zić féléḱ.

Aş ıwıjım ğeş'ığexer kığeş'ığ
Fepşıĺ'ınım feş'ıxeǵé kığeş'ığ.

English translation

Let us say "Allah" with divine love,
Let us cry "Ah!" from the sorrow in our hearts.

We will place our hope in His mercy, He is the Sovereign King,
He is the Generous, He is the Merciful, He is God.

There is no doubt in His Oneness,
Whoever affirms His Oneness will not burn in Hell.

He existed before any creations came to be,
He existed, exalted above all creations.

When He existed, there was neither human nor angel,
Neither sky nor earth, neither moon nor sun, nor any celestial sphere.

Only after that did He bring creations into being,
He created them for the purpose of serving and worshipping Him.

== See also ==
- Adyghe Maq, the main Adyghe-language newspaper
- Anthem of the Republic of Adygea
