= Ghuaze =

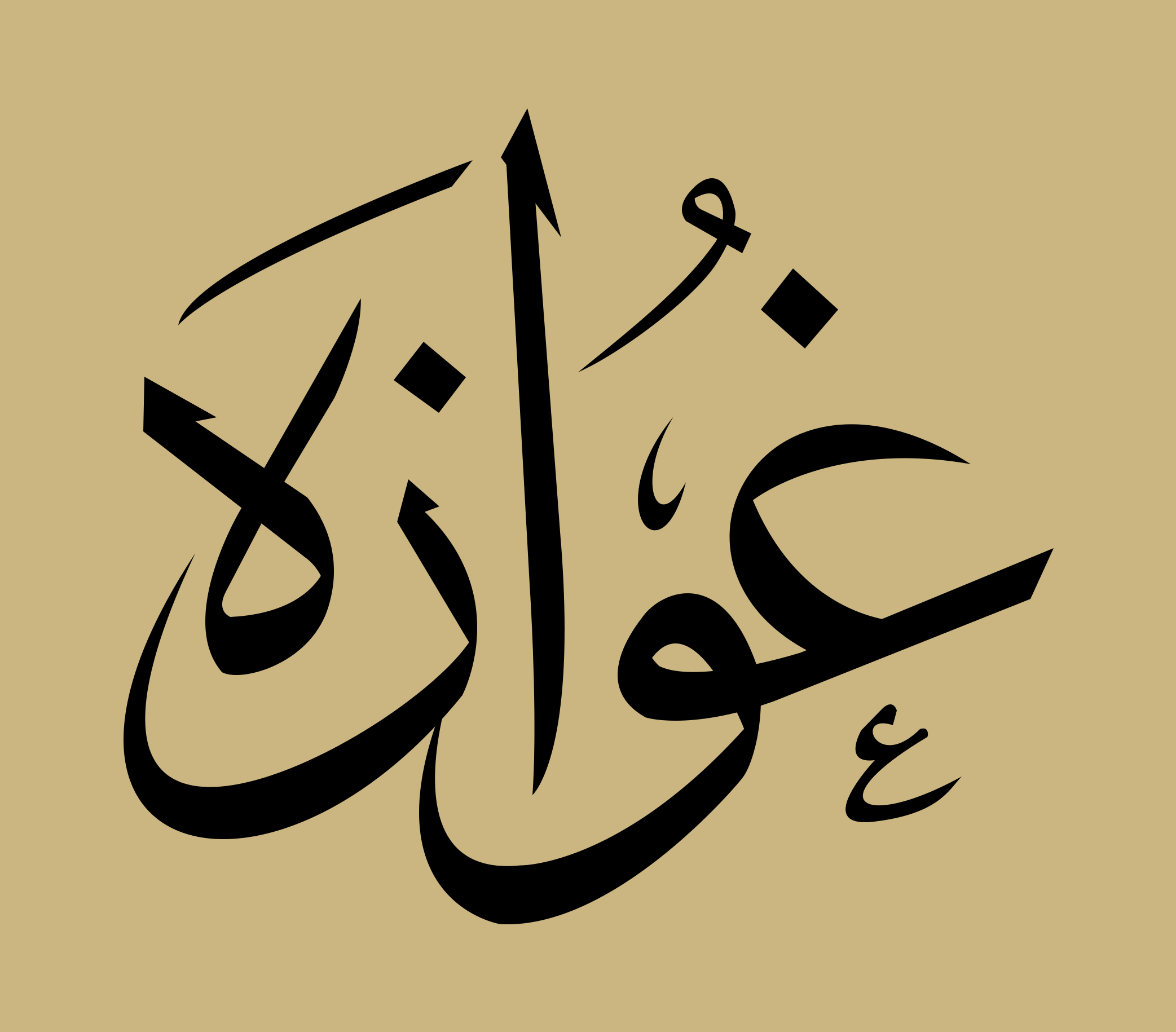
Logo of the newspaper in 1911

Ghuaze or Ğuaze (Adyghe: Гъуазэ; "The Guide") is a Circassian newspaper in Turkey published since 1911. It uses Turkish as well as Circassian. Today, it is published online. The newspaper includes mostly political and historical articles. It was initially published by the Circassian Union and Mutual Aid Society.
