= Coat of arms of Adygea =

Coat of arms of the Republic of Adygea
- Armiger: Murat Kumpilov, Head of the Republic of Adygea
- Adopted: 1994

The coat of arms of the Republic of Adygea, a federal subject of Russia, was adopted on May 24, 1994. It is registered as №163 in the Heraldic Register of the Russian Federation.
