= Old Hungarian script =

Alphabetic writing system used by the Hungarians primarily in the Middle Ages

Old Hungarian script 𐲥𐳋𐳓𐳉𐳗-𐲘𐳀𐳎𐳀𐳢 𐲢𐳛𐳮𐳁𐳤 Székely-magyar rovás
- Script type: Alphabet
- Period: Attested from 10th century. Marginal use into the 17th century, revived in the 20th.
- Direction: Right-to-left script
- Languages: Hungarian

Related scripts
- Parent systems: Egyptian hieroglyphs: Proto-Sinaitic; Phoenician alphabet; Aramaic alphabet; Syriac alphabet; Sogdian alphabet; Old Turkic script; Old Hungarian script

ISO 15924
- ISO 15924: Hung (176), Old Hungarian (Hungarian Runic)

Unicode
- Unicode alias: Old Hungarian
- Unicode range: U+10C80–U+10CFF

The Old Hungarian script, or Hungarian runes (Hungarian: Székely-magyar rovás, 'székely-magyar runiform', or rovásírás), is an alphabetic writing system used for writing the Hungarian language. Modern Hungarian is written using the Latin-based Hungarian alphabet. The term "old" refers to the historical priority of the script compared with the Latin-based one. The Old Hungarian script is a child system of the Old Turkic script.

The Hungarians settled the Carpathian Basin in 895. After the establishment of the Christian Hungarian kingdom, the old writing system was partly forced out of use during the rule of King Stephen, and the Latin alphabet was adopted. However, among some professions (e.g. shepherds who used a "rovás-stick" to officially track the number of animals) and in Transylvania, the script has remained in use by the Székely Magyars, giving it its Hungarian name, (székely) rovásírás. The writing could also be found in churches, such as that in the commune of Atid.

Its English name in the ISO 15924 standard is Old Hungarian (Hungarian Runic).

== Name ==
In modern Hungarian, the script is known formally as Székely rovásírás ('Szekler script'). The writing system is generally known as rovásírás, székely rovásírás, and székely-magyar írás (or simply rovás 'notch, score').

== History ==
=== Origins ===
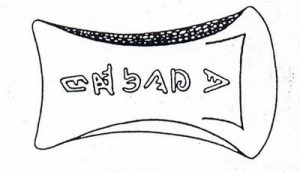
Axe socket found near Campagna

The precise date or origin of the script is unknown.

Origins of the Turkic scripts are uncertain. According to some opinions, ancient Turkic runes descend from primaeval Turkic graphic logograms. Linguist András Róna-Tas derives Old Hungarian from the Old Turkic script, itself recorded in inscriptions dating from c. AD 720.

Speakers of Proto-Hungarian would have come into contact with Turkic peoples during the 7th or 8th century, in the context of the Turkic expansion, as is also evidenced by numerous Turkic loanwords in Proto-Hungarian.

All the letters but one for sounds which were shared by Turkic and Ancient Hungarian can be related to their Old Turkic counterparts. Most of the missing characters were derived by script internal extensions, rather than borrowings, but a small number of characters seem to derive from Greek, such as 'eF'.

The modern Hungarian term for this script (coined in the 19th century), rovás, derives from the verb róni ('to score') which is derived from old Uralic, general Hungarian terminology describing the technique of writing (írni 'to write', betű 'letter', bicska 'knife, also: for carving letters') derive from Turkic, which further supports transmission via Turkic alphabets.

=== Medieval Hungary ===
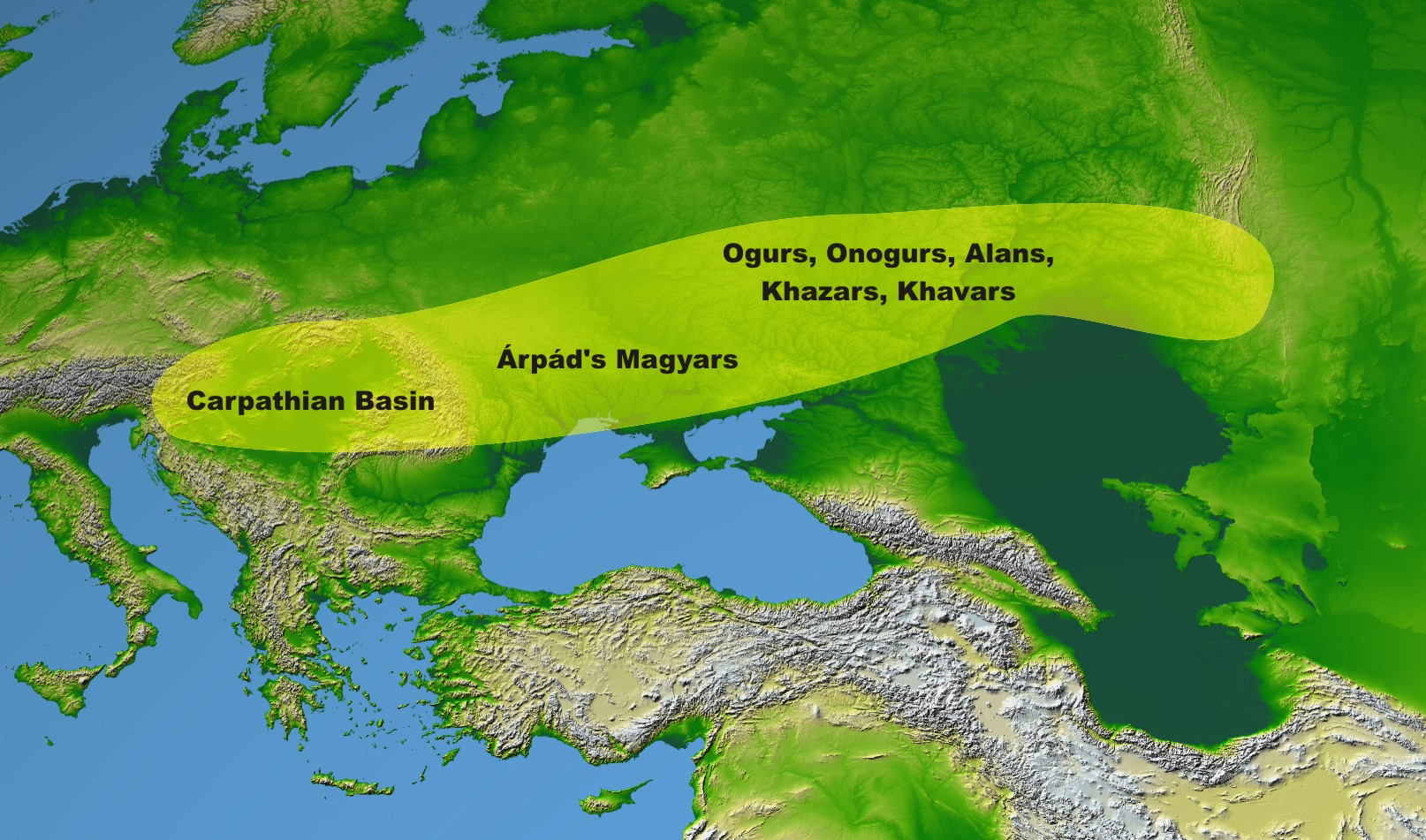
The area of Rovas script usage in the 9th and 10th centuries

Epigraphic evidence for the use of the Old Hungarian script in medieval Hungary dates to the 10th century, for example, from Homokmégy. The latter inscription was found on a fragment of a quiver made of bone. Although there have been several attempts to interpret it, the meaning of it is still unclear.

In 1000, with the coronation of Stephen I of Hungary, Hungary, previously an alliance of mostly nomadic tribes, became a kingdom. The Latin alphabet was adopted as official script; however, Old Hungarian continued to be used in the vernacular.

The runic script was first mentioned in the 13th century Chronicle of Simon of Kéza, where he stated that the Székelys may use the script of the Blaks.

There were still three thousand Huns who fled the battle of Crimhild, who fearing from the western nations, they remained on the cliff field until the time of Árpád, and they did not call themselves Huns, but Szekelys. These Szekelys were the remains of the Huns, who when they learned that the Hungarians had returned to Pannonia for the second time, went to the returnees on the border of Ruthenia and conquered Pannonia together, but not on the Pannonian plane, they were granted estates in the mountainous borderlands together with the Blackis, where mingling with the Blackis it is said they used their letters.

— Simon of Kéza: Gesta Hunnorum et Hungarorum

Johannes Thuróczy wrote in his 1488 Chronica Hungarorum that the Székelys did not forget the Scythian letters and these are engraved on sticks by carving.

It is said that in addition to the Huns who escorted Csaba, from the same nation, three thousand more people retreating, cut themselves out of the said battle, remained in Pannonia, and first established themself in a camp called Csigla's Field. They were afraid of the Western nations which they harassed in Attila's life, and they marched to Transylvania, the frontier of the Pannonian landscape, and they did not call themselves Huns or Hungarians, but Siculus, in their own word Székelys, so that they would not know that they are the remnants of the Huns or Hungarians. In our time, no one doubts, that the Székelys are the remnants of the Huns who first came to Pannonia, and because their people do not seem to have been mixed with foreign blood since then, they are also more strict in their morals, they also differ from other Hungarians in the division of lands. They have not yet forgotten the Scythian letters, and these are not inked on paper, but engraved on sticks skillfully, in the way of the carving. They later grew into not insignificant people, and when the Hungarians came to Pannonia again from Scythia, they went to Ruthenia in front of them with great joy, as soon as the news of their coming came to them. When the Hungarians took possession of Pannonia again, at the division of the country, with the consent of the Hungarians, these Székelys were given the part of the country that they had already chosen as their place of residence.

— Johannes Thuróczy: Chronica Hungarorum

=== Early Modern period ===
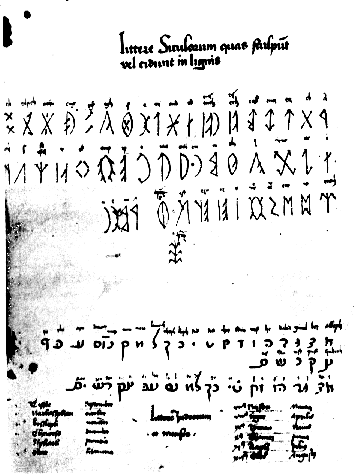
The alphabet of Nikolsburg, 1483

The Old Hungarian script became part of folk art in several areas during this period. In Royal Hungary, Old Hungarian script was used less, although there are relics from this territory as well.

There is another copy – similar to the Nikolsburg Alphabet – of the Old Hungarian alphabet, dated 1609. The inscription from Énlaka, dated 1668, is an example of the folk art use.

There are a number of inscriptions ranging from the 17th to the early 19th centuries, including examples from Kibéd, Csejd, Makfalva, Szolokma, Marosvásárhely, Csíkrákos, Mezőkeresztes, Nagybánya, Torda, Felsőszemeréd, Kecskemét and Kiskunhalas.

=== Scholarly discussion ===
Hungarian script was first described in late Humanist/Baroque scholarship by János Telegdy in his primer Rudimenta Priscae Hunnorum Linguae. Published in 1598, Telegdi's primer presents his understanding of the script and contains Hungarian texts written with runes, such as the Lord's Prayer.

In the 19th century, scholars began to research the rules and the other features of the Old Hungarian script. From this time, the name rovásírás ('runic writing') began to re-enter the popular consciousness in Hungary, and script historians in other countries began to use the terms "Old Hungarian", Altungarisch, and so on. Because the Old Hungarian script had been replaced by Latin, linguistic researchers in the 20th century had to reconstruct the alphabet from historic sources. Gyula Sebestyén, an ethnographer and folklorist, and Gyula (Julius) Németh, a philologist, linguist, and Turkologist, did the lion's share of this work. Sebestyén's publications, Rovás és rovásírás (Runes and runic writing, Budapest, 1909) and A magyar rovásírás hiteles emlékei (The authentic relics of Hungarian runic writing, Budapest, 1915) contain valuable information on the topic.

Not all scholars agree with the Old Hungarian theory. The linguist and sociolinguist Klára Sándor said in an interview that most of the romantic statements about the script appear to be false. According to her analysis, the origin of the writing is probably runiform (and with high probability its origins are in the western Turkic runiform writings) and it is not a different writing system and contrary to the sentiment the writing is neither Hungarian nor Székely-Hungarian; it is a Székely writing since there are no authentic findings outside the historic Székely lands (mainly today's Transylvania); the only writing found around 1000 AD had a different writing system. While it may have been sporadically used in Hungary its usage was not widespread. The revived writing (in the 1990s) was artificially expanded with (various) new letters which were unneeded in the past since the writing was cleanly phonetic, or the long vowels which were not present back in the time. The shape of many letters were substantially changed from the original.

She stated that no works since 1915 have reached the expected quality of the state of the linguistic sciences, and many were influenced by various agendas.

The use of the script often has a political undertone as it is often used along with irredentist or nationalist propaganda, and they can be found from time to time in graffiti with a variety of content. Since most of the people cannot read the script it has led to various controversies, for example when the activists of the Hungarian Two-tailed Dog Party (opposition) exchanged the rovas sign of the city Érd to szia 'Hi!', which stayed unnoticed for a month.

=== Popular revival ===
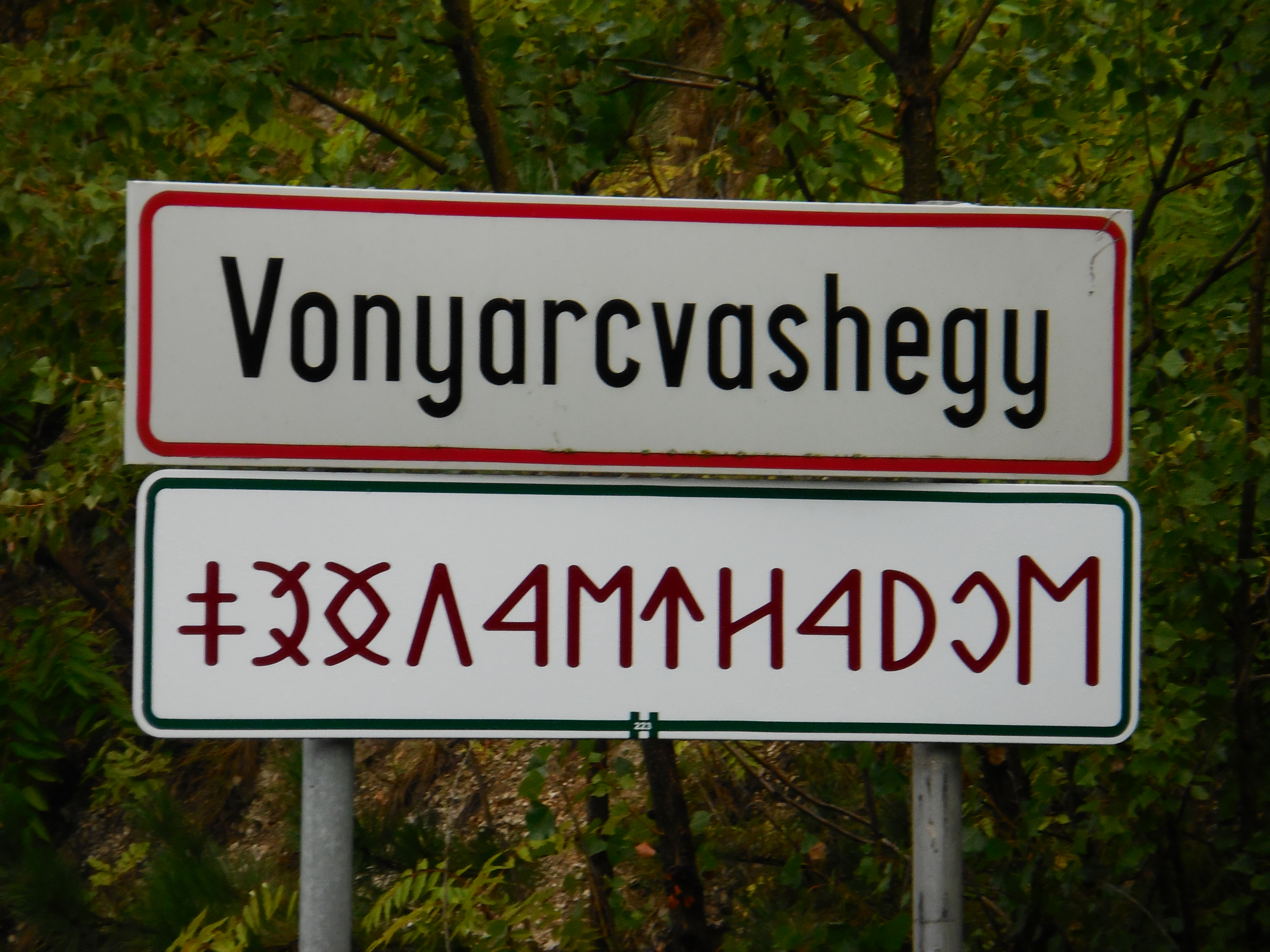
Welcome signs in Latin and Old Hungarian scripts for the town of Vonyarcvashegy, Hungary

Beginning with Adorján Magyar in 1915, the script has been promulgated as a means for writing modern Hungarian. These groups approached the question of representation of the vowels of modern Hungarian in different ways. Adorján Magyar made use of characters to distinguish a/á and e/é but did not distinguish the other vowels by length. A school led by Sándor Forrai from 1974 onward did, however, distinguish i/í, o/ó, ö/ő, u/ú, and ü/ű. The revival has become part of a significant ideological nationalist subculture present not only in Hungary (largely centered in Budapest), but also amongst the Hungarian diaspora, particularly in the United States and Canada.

Old Hungarian has seen other usages in the modern period, sometimes in association with or referencing Hungarian neopaganism, similar to the way in which Norse neopagans have taken up the Germanic runes, and Celtic neopagans have taken up the ogham script for various purposes.

== Epigraphy ==
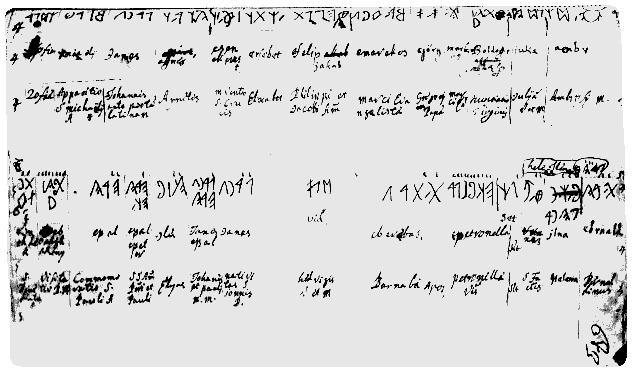
Luigi Ferdinando Marsigli's work (1690). The copied script derives from 1450.

The inscription corpus includes:

- A labeled crest etched into stone from Pécs, late 13th century (Label: aBA SZeNTjeI vaGYUNK aKI eSZTeR ANna erZSéBeT; We are the saints [nuns] of Aba; who are Esther, Anna and Elizabeth.)
- Rod calendar, around 1300, copied by Luigi Ferdinando Marsigli in 1690. It contains several feasts and names, thus it is one of the most extensive runic records.
- Nicholsburg alphabet
- Runic record in Istanbul, 1515.
- Székelyderzs: a brick with runic inscription, found in the Unitarian church
- Énlaka runic inscription, discovered by Balázs Orbán in 1864
- Székelydálya: runic inscription, found in the Calvinist church
- The inscription from Felsőszemeréd (Horné Semerovce), Slovakia (15th century)

== Characters ==
The runic alphabet included 42 letters. As in the Old Turkic script, some consonants had two forms, one to be used with back vowels (a, á, o, ó, u, ú) and another for front vowels (e, é, i, í, ö, ő, ü, ű). The names of the consonants are always pronounced with a vowel. In the old alphabet, the consonant-vowel order is reversed, unlike today's pronunciation (ep rather than pé). This is because the oldest inscriptions lacked vowels and were rarely written down, similar to other ancient languages' consonant-writing systems (like the abjads used by the Semitic languages - Hebrew, Aramaic, Arabic, etc.). The alphabet did not contain letters for the phonemes dz and dzs of modern Hungarian, since these are relatively recent developments in the language's history. Nor did it have letters corresponding to the Latin q, w, x and y. The modern revitalization movement has created symbols for these; in Unicode encoding, they are represented as ligatures.

For more information about the transliteration's pronunciation, see Hungarian alphabet.

Letter	Name	Phoneme (IPA)	Old Hungarian (image)	Old Hungarian (Unicode)
A	a	/ɒ/		𐲀 𐳀
Á	á	/aː/		𐲁 𐳁
B	eb	/b/		𐲂 𐳂
C	ec	/ts/		𐲄 𐳄
Cs	ecs	/tʃ/		𐲆 𐳆
D	ed	/d/		𐲇 𐳇
(Dz)	dzé	/dz/		Ligature of 𐲇 and 𐲯
(Dzs)	dzsé	/dʒ/		Ligature of 𐲇 and 𐲰
E	e	/ɛ/		𐲉 𐳉
É	é	/eː/		𐲋 𐳋
F	ef	/f/		𐲌 𐳌
G	eg	/ɡ/		𐲍 𐳍
Gy	egy	/ɟ/		𐲎 𐳎
H	eh	/h/		𐲏 𐳏
I	i	/i/		𐲐 𐳐
Í	í	/iː/		𐲑 𐳑
J	ej	/j/		𐲒 𐳒
K	ek	/k/		𐲓 𐳓
K	ak	/k/		𐲔 𐳔
L	el	/l/		𐲖 𐳖
Ly	elly, el-ipszilon	/j/		𐲗 𐳗
M	em	/m/		𐲘 𐳘
N	en	/n/		𐲙 𐳙
Ny	eny	/ɲ/		𐲚 𐳚
O	o	/o/		𐲛 𐳛
Ó	ó	/oː/		𐲜 𐳜
Ö	ö	/ø/		𐲝 𐳝 𐲞 𐳞
Ő	ő	/øː/		𐲟 𐳟
P	ep	/p/		𐲠 𐳠
(Q)	eq	(/kv/)		Ligature of 𐲓 and 𐲮
R	er	/r/		𐲢 𐳢
S	es	/ʃ/		𐲤 𐳤
Sz	esz	/s/		𐲥 𐳥
T	et	/t/		𐲦 𐳦
Ty	ety	/c/		𐲨 𐳨
U	u	/u/		𐲪 𐳪
Ú	ú	/uː/		𐲫 𐳫
Ü	ü	/y/		𐲬 𐳬
Ű	ű	/yː/		𐲭 𐳭
V	ev	/v/		𐲮 𐳮
(W)	dupla vé	/v/		Ligature of 𐲮 and 𐲮
(X)	iksz	(/ks/)		Ligature of 𐲓 and 𐲥
(Y)	ipszilon	/i/ ~ /j/		Ligature of 𐲐 and 𐲒
Z	ez	/z/		𐲯 𐳯
Zs	ezs	/ʒ/		𐲰 𐳰

The Old Hungarian runes also include some non-alphabetical runes which are not ligatures but separate signs. These are identified in some sources as "capita dictionum" (likely a misspelling of capita dicarum). Further research is needed to define their origin and traditional usage. Some common examples are:

- TPRUS:
- ENT: 𐲧 𐳧
- TPRU:
- NAP:
- EMP: 𐲡 𐳡
- UNK: 𐲕 𐳕
- US: 𐲲 𐳲
- AMB: 𐲃 𐳃

== Features ==
Old Hungarian letters were usually written from right to left on sticks. Later, in Transylvania, they appeared on several media. Writings on walls also were right to left and not boustrophedon style (alternating direction right to left and then left to right).

Hungarian numerals

The numbers are almost the same as the Roman, Etruscan, and Chuvash numerals. Numbers of livestock were carved on tally sticks and the sticks were then cut in two lengthwise to avoid later disputes.

1	2	3	4	5	6	7	8	9	10	50	100	500	1000
𐳺	𐳺𐳺	𐳺𐳺𐳺	𐳺𐳺𐳺𐳺	𐳻	𐳻𐳺	𐳻𐳺𐳺	𐳻𐳺𐳺𐳺	𐳻𐳺𐳺𐳺𐳺	𐳼	𐳽	𐳾	̲𐳽	𐳿

- Ligatures are common. (Note: the Hungarian runic script employed a number of ligatures. In some cases, an entire word was written with a single sign similar to a bind rune.) The Unicode standard supports ligatures explicitly by using the zero width joiner between the two characters.
- There are no lower or upper case letters, but the first letter of a proper name was often written a bit larger. Though the Unicode standard has upper and lowercase letters, which are the same in shape, the difference is only their size.
- The writing system did not always mark vowels (similar to many Asian writing systems). The rules for vowel inclusion were as follows:
  - If there are two vowels side by side, both have to be written, unless the second could be readily determined.
  - The vowels have to be written if their omission created ambiguity. (Example: krk – 𐳓𐳢𐳓 can be interpreted as kerék – 𐳓𐳉𐳢𐳋𐳓 (wheel) and kerek – 𐳓𐳉𐳢𐳉𐳓 (rounded), thus the writer had to include the vowels to differentiate the intended words.)
  - The vowel at the end of the word must be written.
- Sometimes, especially when writing consonant clusters, a consonant was omitted. This is a phonologic process, with the script reflecting the exact surface realization.

== Text example ==
Text From Csikszentmárton, 1501

Text from Csíkszentmárton, 1501. Runes originally written as ligatures are underlined.

Unicode transcription: 𐲪𐲢𐲙𐲔⁝𐲥𐲬𐲖𐲦𐲤𐲦𐲬𐲖⁝𐲌𐲛𐲍𐲮𐲀𐲙⁝𐲐𐲢𐲙𐲔⁝𐲯𐲢𐲞𐲦 ⁝𐲥𐲀𐲯𐲎⁝𐲥𐲦𐲙𐲇𐲞𐲂𐲉⁝𐲘𐲀𐲨𐲤⁝𐲒𐲀𐲙𐲛𐲤⁝𐲤𐲨𐲦𐲙⁝𐲓𐲛𐲮𐲀𐲆⁝𐲆𐲐𐲙𐲀𐲖𐲦𐲔⁝𐲘𐲀𐲨𐲀𐲤𐲘𐲤𐲦𐲢⁝𐲍𐲢𐲍𐲗𐲘𐲤𐲦𐲢𐲆𐲐𐲙𐲀𐲖𐲦𐲀𐲔 𐲍·𐲐𐲒·𐲀·𐲤·𐲐·𐲗·𐲗·𐲖𐲦·𐲀·

Interpretation in old Hungarian: "ÚRNaK SZÜLeTéSéTÜL FOGVÁN ÍRNaK eZeRÖTSZÁZeGY eSZTeNDŐBE MÁTYáS JÁNOS eSTYTáN KOVÁCS CSINÁLTáK MÁTYáSMeSTeR GeRGeLYMeSTeRCSINÁLTÁK G IJ A aS I LY LY LT A" (The letters actually written in the runic text are written with uppercase in the transcription.)

Interpretation in modern Hungarian: "(Ezt) az Úr születése utáni 1501. évben írták. Mátyás, János, István kovácsok csinálták. Mátyás mester (és) Gergely mester csinálták gijas ily ly lta"

English translation: "(This) was written in the 1501st year of our Lord. The smiths Matthias, John (and) Stephen did (this). Master Matthias (and) Master Gregory did (uninterpretable)

== Unicode ==
After many proposals Old Hungarian was added to the Unicode Standard in June 2015 with the release of version 8.0.

The Unicode block for Old Hungarian is U+10C80–U+10CFF:

Old Hungarian^{[1]}^{[2]} Official Unicode Consortium code chart (PDF)
	0	1	2	3	4	5	6	7	8	9	A	B	C	D	E	F
U+10C8x	𐲀	𐲁	𐲂	𐲃	𐲄	𐲅	𐲆	𐲇	𐲈	𐲉	𐲊	𐲋	𐲌	𐲍	𐲎	𐲏
U+10C9x	𐲐	𐲑	𐲒	𐲓	𐲔	𐲕	𐲖	𐲗	𐲘	𐲙	𐲚	𐲛	𐲜	𐲝	𐲞	𐲟
U+10CAx	𐲠	𐲡	𐲢	𐲣	𐲤	𐲥	𐲦	𐲧	𐲨	𐲩	𐲪	𐲫	𐲬	𐲭	𐲮	𐲯
U+10CBx	𐲰	𐲱	𐲲													
U+10CCx	𐳀	𐳁	𐳂	𐳃	𐳄	𐳅	𐳆	𐳇	𐳈	𐳉	𐳊	𐳋	𐳌	𐳍	𐳎	𐳏
U+10CDx	𐳐	𐳑	𐳒	𐳓	𐳔	𐳕	𐳖	𐳗	𐳘	𐳙	𐳚	𐳛	𐳜	𐳝	𐳞	𐳟
U+10CEx	𐳠	𐳡	𐳢	𐳣	𐳤	𐳥	𐳦	𐳧	𐳨	𐳩	𐳪	𐳫	𐳬	𐳭	𐳮	𐳯
U+10CFx	𐳰	𐳱	𐳲								𐳺	𐳻	𐳼	𐳽	𐳾	𐳿
Notes 1.As of Unicode version 18.0 2.Grey areas indicate non-assigned code points

== Pre-Unicode encodings ==
A set of closely related eight-bit code pages exist, devised in the 1990s by Gabor Hosszú. These were mapped to Latin-1 or Latin-2 character set fonts. After installing one of them and applying their formatting to the document – because of the lack of capital letters – runic characters could be entered in the following way: those letters which are unique letters in today's Hungarian orthography are virtually lowercase ones, and can be written by simply pressing the specific key; and since the modern digraphs equal two separate rovás letters, they were encoded as 'uppercase' letters, i.e. in the space originally restricted for capitals. Thus, typing a lowercase g will produce the rovás character for the sound marked with Latin script g, but entering an uppercase G will amount to a rovás sign equivalent to a digraph gy in Latin-based Hungarian orthography.

== Gallery ==
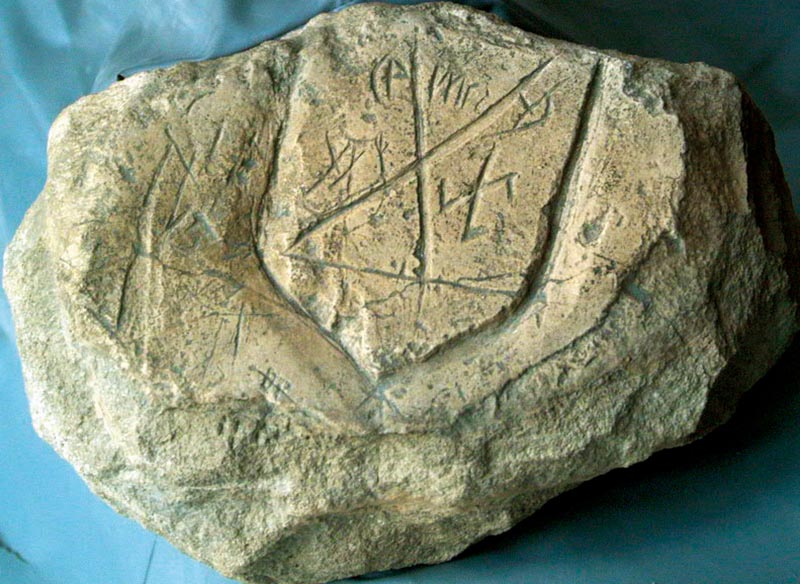
Stone Shield pattern of Pécs with Old Hungarian Script (circa 1250 AD), Hungary

Rovás inscription from Homoródkarácsonyfalva, 13th century

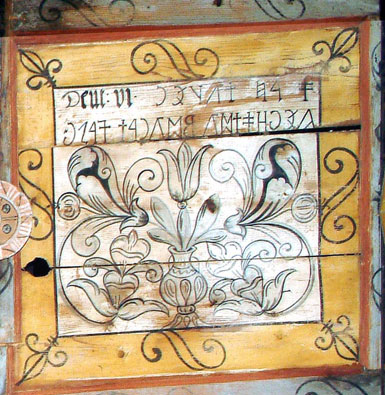
Inscription in Énlaka's Unitarian church (1668)

== See also ==
- National symbols of Hungary
