= Hungarian Braille =

Braille alphabet of the Hungarian language

- Script type: alphabet
- Print basis: Hungarian alphabet
- Languages: Hungarian

Related scripts
- Parent systems: Braille: Hungarian Braille

The braille alphabet used to write Hungarian is based on the international norm for the 27 basic letters of the Latin script. However, the letters for q and z have been replaced, to increase the symmetry of the accented letters of the Hungarian alphabet, which are largely innovative to Hungarian braille.

== Alphabet ==
The Hungarian alphabet is:

A Á B C Cs D Dz Dzs E É F G Gy H I Í J K L Ly M N Ny O Ó Ö Ő P (Q) R S Sz T Ty U Ú Ü Ű V (W) (X) (Y) Z Zs

The letters that conform to traditional braille are:

a	b	c	d	e	f	g	h
i	j	k	l	m	n	o	p
r	s	t	u	v	w	x	y

The accented vowel letters are derived from their base letters through stretching or reflection as follows. The traditional letter for q (which is not part of the basic Hungarian alphabet) has been reassigned to ö, and an unused pattern has been assigned to ü:

	a	e	i	o	ö	u	ü	q
ä	á	é	í	ó	ő	ú	ű	

This creates the following symmetrical pattern for the umlauted vowels:

ö	ő
ü	ű

(Ä is not part of the basic Hungarian alphabet.)

The consonant digraphs are derived from their base letters as follows. The traditional letter for z has been replaced, and is used for a parenthesis. As with the accented vowels, the majority of digraphs are created through reflection:

c	g	l	n	t	s	z
cs	gy	ly	ny	ty	sz	zs
ccs	ggy	lly	nny	tty	ssz	zzs

This creates the following pattern among the sibilants:

s	sz
z	zs

Dz and Dzs are treated as D-Z and D-Zs respectively.

== Punctuation ==
Unlike English or French Braille, Hungarian Braille has separate opening and closing symbols for both parentheses and quotation marks.

,	.	;	:	-	'	?	!	... „ ... ”	... ( ... )	/

== Mathematics and computer notation ==
number sign (#)	Dollar sign ($)	percent sign (%)	ampersant (&)	plus sign (+)	asterisk / multiplication sign (*)
division sign (/)	equality sign (=)	at sign (@)	backslash (\)	caret (^)	underscore (_)
`	tilde / similarity sign (~)	paragraph sign (§)	euro (€)	bullet sign (•)	degree (°)

== Roman Numerals ==
the Roman numerals use the capital letters of i, v, x, l, c, m

I	II	III	IV	V
VI	VII	VIII	IX	X
XI	XX	XXI	XXX	XXXI
XL	XLI	L	LI	LX
LXI	C	CI	M	MI

== Formatting ==
(num.)	(caps)
