= Hungarian alphabet =

Latin alphabet of the Hungarian language

Hungarian alphabet magyar ábécé
- Script type: Alphabet
- Period: 11th century to present
- Official script: Hungary
- Languages: Hungarian

Related scripts
- Parent systems: Egyptian hieroglyphs: Proto-Sinaitic script; Phoenician script; Greek alphabet; Old Italic script; Latin script; Hungarian alphabet

The Hungarian alphabet (Hungarian: magyar ábécé, pronounced [ˈmɒɟɒr ˈaːbeːt͡seː]) is an extension of the Latin alphabet used for writing the Hungarian language.

The alphabet is based on the Latin alphabet, with several added variations of letters, consisting of 44 letters. Over the 26 letters of the ISO basic Latin alphabet it has five letters with an acute accent, two letters with an umlaut, two letters with a double acute accent, eight letters made up of two characters, and one letter made up of three characters. In some other languages, characters with diacritical marks would be considered variations of the base letter, however in Hungarian, these characters are considered letters in their own right.

One sometimes speaks of the smaller (or basic) and greater (or extended) Hungarian alphabets, differing by the inclusion or exclusion of the letters Q, W, X, Y, which can only be found in family names, and in foreign words. (As for Y, however, it exists as part of four digraphs.)

As an auxiliary letter sometimes Ë is used in academic documents to show different pronunciation of spoken dialects, though it is not part of the alphabet.

Majuscule forms (also called uppercase or capital letters)
A	Á	B	C	Cs	D	Dz	Dzs	E	É	F	G	Gy	H	I	Í	J	K	L	Ly	M	N
Ny	O	Ó	Ö	Ő	P	Q	R	S	Sz	T	Ty	U	Ú	Ü	Ű	V	W	X	Y	Z	Zs
Minuscule forms (also called lowercase or small letters)
a	á	b	c	cs	d	dz	dzs	e	é	f	g	gy	h	i	í	j	k	l	ly	m	n
ny	o	ó	ö	ő	p	q	r	s	sz	t	ty	u	ú	ü	ű	v	w	x	y	z	zs

== Description ==
Each sign shown above counts as a letter in its own right in Hungarian. Some, such as the letter ⟨ó⟩ and ⟨ő⟩, are inter-filed with the letter preceding it when sorting words alphabetically, whereas others, such as ⟨ö⟩, have their own place in collation rather than also being inter-filed with ⟨o⟩.

While long vowels count as different letters, long (or geminate) consonants do not. Long consonants are marked by duplication: e.g. ⟨tt⟩, ⟨gg⟩, ⟨zz⟩ (ette 'he ate' (det.obj.), függ 'it hangs', azzal 'with that'). For the di- and tri-graphs a simplification rule normally applies (but not when the compound is split at the end of a line of text due to hyphenation), only the first letter being duplicated, e.g.

⟨sz⟩ + ⟨sz⟩ → ⟨ssz⟩ (asszony 'woman'),
⟨ty⟩ + ⟨ty⟩ → ⟨tty⟩ (hattyú 'swan'),
⟨dzs⟩ + ⟨dzs⟩ → ⟨ddzs⟩ (briddzsel 'with bridge (playing game)').

An exception is made at the joining points of compound words, for example: jegygyűrű 'engagement ring' (jegy + gyűrű) rather than *jeggyűrű.

Hyphenation of individual letters ⟨Dz⟩ and ⟨dzs⟩ were changed in the 11th edition of Hungarian orthography (1984). Prior to that, they were allowed to separate as two-letter combinations ⟨d⟩+⟨z⟩ and ⟨d⟩+⟨zs⟩.

== Pronunciation ==
The pronunciation given for the following Hungarian letters is that of standard Hungarian.

Letter	Minuscule Form	Name	Phoneme (IPA)	Complementary allophones (IPA)	Close to	Notes
A	a	a	/ɒ/		similar to British English hot	Lot, got, bot might describe it better.
Á	á	á	/aː/		eye	Not nearly as open as the a in American English hat, but closer to it than Hungarian a (without the accent mark)
B	b	bé	/b/		as by, absence etc.	
C	c	cé	/t͡s/		like pots	
Cs	cs	csé	/t͡ʃ/		as check, cheek, etching etc.	
D	d	dé	/d/		deck, wide etc.	
Dz	dz	dzé	/dz/		like in kids	Uncommon. When neither post- nor preconsonantic, always realised as a geminate.
Dzs	dzs	dzsé	/dʒ/		John, jam, bridge	Uncommon, mostly in loanwords. when final or intervocalic, usually realised as a geminate: maharadzsa /mɑhɑrɑdʒɑ/ [mɑhɑrɑd͡ʒːɑ] 'maharajah', bridzs /bridʒ/ [brid͡ʒː] 'bridge (card game)', but dzsungel /dʒuŋɡɛl/ [d͡ʒuŋɡɛl] 'jungle', fridzsider /fridʒidɛr/ [frid͡ʒidɛr] coll. 'refrigerator'
E	e	e	/ɛ/		like less, cheque, edge, bed	about 40-50% of speakers also have a phoneme /e/ (see below at Ë). /e/ is not considered part of standard Hungarian, wherein /ɛ/ takes the place of /e/.
É	é	é	/eː/		café	
F	f	ef	/f/		find, euphoria	
G	g	gé	/ɡ/		get, leg, go etc.	
Gy	gy	gyé	/ɟ/		(not used in English; soft form of /d/. Mostly similar to during, as pronounced in Received Pronunciation)	denoting /ɟ/ by ⟨gy⟩ is a remnant of (probably) Italian scribes who tried to render the Hungarian sound. <dy> would be a more consistent notation in scope of ⟨ty⟩, ⟨ny⟩, ⟨ly⟩; (see there), as the ⟨y⟩ part of digraphs show palatalisation in the Hungarian writing system.
H	h	há	a. /h/ b. ∅	a1. [ɦ] a2. [x] a3. [ç]	Basic: hi a1. behind a2. Loch, Chanukah a3. human b. honest	a1. when in intervocalic position. a2. seldom, in final position, such as in doh 'dampness', MÉH 'metal recycling facility' a3. seldom, such as in ihlet 'inspiration' b. not rendered usually when in final position méh /meː/ 'bee', cseh /tʃɛ/ 'Czech'
I	i	i	/i/		peak	Pronounced the same as Í, only shorter
Í	í	í	/iː/		lean, leave, seed, sea	Vowel length is phonemically distinctive in Hungarian: irt = 'to exterminate' and írt = 'to write (past tense)'
J	j	jé	/j/	[ç], [ʝ]	you, yes, faith	allophones occur when /j/ occurs after a consonant; (voiceless after voiceless, voiced after voiced consonants). e.g. férj 'husband', kapj 'get! (imperative)'
K	k	ká	/k/		key, kiss, weak	
L	l	el	/l/		leave, list	
Ly	ly	elly, el-ipszilon	1. /j/; 2. /ʎ/		play, pray	Most dialects pronounce it as /j/; see yeísmo.
M	m	em	/m/		mind, assume, might	
N	n	en	/n/	[ŋ]	thing, lying (before k, g), need, bone (anywhere else)	allophone before /k/, /ɡ/
Ny	ny	eny	/ɲ/		canyon	
O	o	o	/o/		force, sorcerer	A shorter, more open variant of Ó. Unlike with short e, which is opened to /ɛ/ in standard speech, short o remains /o/, rather than opening to /ɔ/ where it would come close to clashing with short a.
Ó	ó	ó	/oː/		fraud, cause (Southern England, Australian or New Zealand English)	Same as /o/ except longer. It is important to pay attention to. (Minimal pair to kor = 'age' and kór = 'disease')
Ö	ö	ö	/ø/		(not used in English; most similar to learnt, earl, fern)	(Corresponds to (short) German Ö); similar to shwa /ə/ (e.g. cola) except with rounded lips. A shorter, more open variant of Ő
Ő	ő	ő	/øː/		bird (Broad New Zealand accent)	(A longer, more closed variant of Ö.) Minimal pair to /ø/: öt = 'five' and őt = 'him/her (Hungarian pronouns do not specify gender)'
P	p	pé	/p/		peas, apricot, hope	
R	r	er	/r/		The closest equivalent is r	also called apical trill as pronounced by trilling the tip of the tongue (the apex) and not the uvula.
S	s	es	/ʃ/		share, wish, shout	This notation is unusual for European writing systems where ⟨s⟩ usually stands for /s/. In Hungarian, /s/ is represented by ⟨sz⟩.
Sz	sz	esz	/s/		say, estimate	
T	t	té	/t/		tell, least, feast	
Ty	ty	tyé	/c/		(not used in English; soft form of /t/. Mostly similar to tube, as pronounced in Received Pronunciation)	
U	u	u	/u/		school, tool	
Ú	ú	ú	/uː/		fool	Minimal pair to /u/: hurok = 'loop' and húrok = 'cords'
Ü	ü	ü	/y/		(not used in English, corresponds to German ü; closest to do, food)	A shorter, more open variant of ű
Ű	ű	ű	/yː/		(not used in English, corresponds to a longer version of the German ü)	
V	v	vé	/v/		very, every	
Z	z	zé	/z/		desert, roses, zebra	
Zs	zs	zsé	/ʒ/		pleasure, leisure	

The letter ë is not part of the Hungarian alphabet; however, linguists use this letter to distinguish between the two kinds of short e sounds of some dialects. This letter was first used in 1770 by György Kalmár, but has never officially been part of the Hungarian alphabet, as the standard Hungarian language does not distinguish between these two sounds. However, the ë sound is pronounced differently from the e sound in 6 out of the 10 Hungarian dialects and the sound is pronounced as ö in 1 dialect. It is also used in names. Other letter for this sound is Ėė (rarely).

A more open variety of /ɛ/, close to [æ], may be denoted as Ää in the Hungarian linguistics literature.

The digraph ch also exists in some words (technika, monarchia) and is pronounced the same as h. In names, however, it is pronounced like cs as well as like h or k (as in German) (see below).

The letter Y is only used in loanwords and several digraphs (gy, ly, ny, ty), and thus in a native Hungarian word, Y never comes as the initial of a word, except in loanwords. So, for native Hungarian words, the capital Y only exists in all caps or small caps formats, such as the titles of newspapers.

=== Historic spellings used in names and historical documents ===
Old spellings (sometimes similar to German orthography) used in some Hungarian names and their corresponding pronunciation according to modern spelling include the following:

Consonants
Historic spelling	Pronounced like modern spelling
bb	b
cz	c
tz	c
z	c
ch	cs
cz	cs
č	cs
ć	cs
ts	cs
csh	cs
tsch	cs
tzsch	cs
chs	cs
cy	cs
ʟ	cs
dd	d
dsz	dz
ds	dzs
ff	f
ph	f
gh	g
dgy	ggy
dy	gy
g	gy
gi	gy
gj	gy
gʹ~g′	gy
ǵ	gy
ġ	gy
j	gy
jj	j
l	j
y	j
ck	k
kh	k
x	ks
xy	ksz
xz	ksz
qu	kv
ll	l
l	ll
w	lv
j	ly
l	ly
li	ly
ry	ly
lly	ly
′l(ʹl)~l′(lʹ)~ŀ	ly
n	ny
ni	ny
nʹ~n′	ny
ń	ny
ṅ	ny
my	ny
ph	p
pp	p
rh	r
rr	r
ꝛ	r
sch	s
ss	s
ss	ssz
s	sz
sc	sz
sy	sz
z	sz
th	t
tt	t
ti	ty
tʹ~t′	ty
ṫ	ty
ky	ty
u	v
w	v
s	z
s	zs
ss	zs
zy	zs
['s]	zs

Vowels
Historic spelling	Pronounced as in modern spelling
a	á
aa	á
aá	á
áá	á
áh	á
ä	e
ae	e
ai	e
ay	e
áe	é
ái	é
áy	é
e	é
ee	é
eé	é
éh	é
i	í
ié	í
íh	í
ii	í
ií	í
å	o
o	ó
óh	ó
oo	ó
oó	ó
ua	ó
â	ö
åe	ö
åi	ö
åy	ö
eö	ö
ew	ö
oe	ö
oi	ö
oy	ö
eö	ő
eő	ő
ew	ő
ia	ő
ö	ő
őh	ő
öö	ő
öő	ő
óe	ő
ói	ő
óy	ő
üa	ő
u	ú
úh	ú
uó	ú
uu	ú
uú	ú
ue	ü
ui	ü
uy	ü
ü	ű
űh	ű
üő	ű
üü	ű
üű	ű
úe	ű
úi	ű
úy	ű
aë	aj
aï	aj
aÿ	aj
ei	aj
áë	áj
áï	áj
áÿ	áj
åë	oj
åï	oj
åÿ	oj
eu	oj
oë	oj
oï	oj
oÿ	oj
óë	ój
óï	ój
óÿ	ój
au	uj
uë	uj
uï	uj
uÿ	uj
úë	új
úï	új
úÿ	új
(g)y ~ gÿ	gi
y	ji
ý	jí
(l)y ~ lÿ	(l)i
(n)y ~ nÿ	(ny)i or (n)i
(t)y ~ tÿ	ti

On áá:

Generally, y in historic spellings of names formed with the -i affix (not to be confused with a possessive -i- of plural objects, as in szavai!) can exist after many other letters (e.g.: Teleky, Rákóczy, Dézsy). Here are listed only examples which can be easily misread because of such spelling.

Examples:

Name	Pronounced as if spelled
Madách	Madács
Széchenyi	Szécsényi or Szécsenyi
Batthyány	Battyányi
Gajdátsy	Gajdácsi
Thököly	Tököli
Weöres	Vörös
Eötvös	Ötvös
Kassay	Kassai
Debrődy	Debrődi
Karczagy	Karcagi
Vörösmarty	Vörösmarti
Cházár	Császár
Czukor	Cukor
Balogh	Balog
Vargha	Varga
Paal	Pál
Gaál	Gál
Veér	Vér
Rédey	Rédei
Soós	Sós
Thewrewk	Török
Dessewffy	Dezsőfi

=== Historic spellings of article and conjunctions ===
In early editions the article a/az was written according to the following rules:

- before vowels and h — az: az ember, az híd
- before consonants — a': a' csillag.

The abbreviated form of the conjunction és (and), which is always written today as s, was likely to be written with an apostrophe before — 's (e.g. föld 's nép).

== Capitalisation ==
The di- and the trigraphs are capitalised in names and at the beginning of sentences by capitalising the first glyph of them only.

- Csak jót mondhatunk Székely Csabáról.

In abbreviations and when writing with all capital letters, however, one capitalises the second (and third) character as well.

Thus ("The Rules of Hungarian Orthography", a book edited by the Hungarian Academy of Sciences):

- A magyar helyesírás szabályai
- MHSZ (not MHSz)
- A MAGYAR HELYESÍRÁS SZABÁLYAI (not SzABÁLyAI)

== Alphabetical ordering (collation) ==
While the characters with diacritical marks are considered separate letters, vowels that differ only in length are treated the same when ordering words. Therefore, for example, the pairs O/Ó and Ö/Ő are not distinguished in ordering, but Ö follows O. In cases where two words are differentiated solely by the presence of an accent, the one without the accent is put before the other one. (The situation is the same for lower and upper-case letters: in alphabetical ordering, varga is followed by Varga.)

The polygraphic consonant signs are treated as single letters.

comb	
cukor	
csak	<cs> comes after <c>
...	
folyik	
folyó	<ó> is sorted as <o>
folyosó	
...	
fő	and <ő> is sorted as <ö>,
födém	but <ö> comes after <o>
...	

The simplified geminates of multigraphs (see above) such as <nny>, <ssz> are collated as <ny>+<ny>, <sz>+<sz> etc., if they are double geminates, rather than co-occurrences of a single letter and a geminate.

könnyű is collated as <k><ö><ny><ny><ű>. tizennyolc of course as <t><i><z><e><n><ny><o><l><c>, as this is a compound: tizen+nyolc ('above ten' + 'eight' = 'eighteen').

Similar 'ambiguities', which can occur with compounds (which are highly common in Hungarian) are dissolved and collated by sense.

e.g. házszám 'house number (address)' = ház + szám and of course not *házs + *zám.

These rules make Hungarian alphabetic ordering algorithmically difficult (one has to know the correct segmentation of a word to sort it correctly), which was a problem for computer software development.

== Keyboard layout ==
The standard Hungarian keyboard layout is German-based (QWERTZ). This layout allows direct access to every character in the Hungarian alphabet.

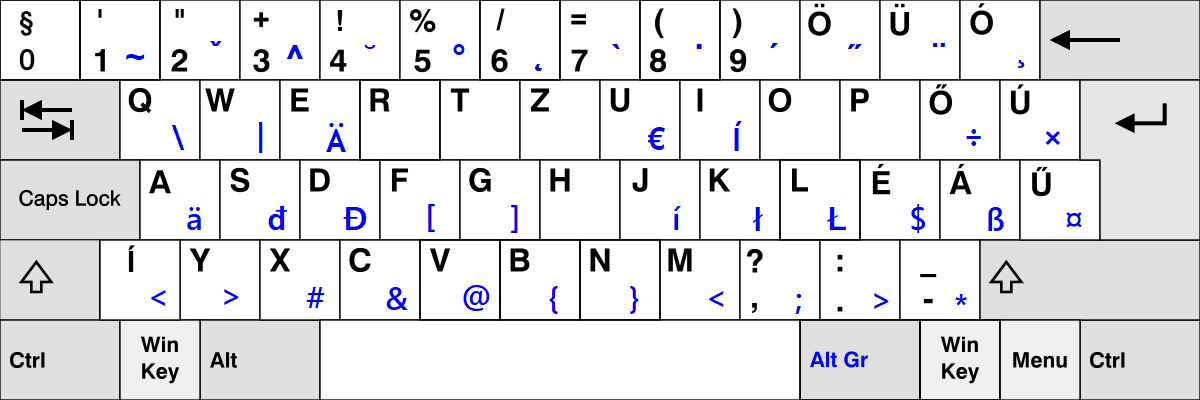
Hungarian keyboard layout

The letter "Í" is often placed left of the space key, leaving the width of the left Shift key intact. "Ű" may be located to the left of Backspace, making that key smaller, but allowing for a larger Enter key. Ű being close to Enter often leads to it being typed instead of hitting Enter, especially when one has just switched from a keyboard that has Ű next to backspace. The German "Ä" and "ß", the Polish "Ł", and the Croatian "Đ" are also present.

== Letter frequencies ==
The most common letters in Hungarian are e and a.

The list below shows the letter frequencies for the smaller Hungarian alphabet in descending order (sample: 9620 letters).

Letter	Frequency
e	12.256%
a	9.428%
t	7.380%
n	6.445%
l	6.383%
s	5.322%
k	4.522%
é	4.511%
i	4.200%
m	4.054%
o	3.867%
á	3.649%
g	2.838%
r	2.807%
z	2.734%
v	2.453%
b	2.058%
d	2.037%
sz	1.809%
j	1.570%
h	1.341%
gy	1.185%
ő	0.884%
ö	0.821%
ny	0.790%
ly	0.738%
ü	0.655%
ó	0.634%
f	0.582%
p	0.509%
í	0.499%
u	0.416%
cs	0.260%
ű	0.125%
c	0.114%
ú	0.104%
zs	0.021%
ty	<0.010%

== Old Hungarian script ==
The Old Hungarian script is a writing system formerly used for the Hungarian language. It was derived from the Old Turkic script. Its usage began to decline after the Kingdom of Hungary adopted the Latin alphabet.

Epigraphic evidence for the use of the Old Hungarian script in medieval Hungary dates to the 10th century. At the turn of the 11th century, with the coronation of Stephen I of Hungary, Hungary became a kingdom and the Latin alphabet was adopted as official script.

The runic script was first mentioned in the 13th century Chronicle of Simon of Kéza, where he stated that the Székelys may use the script of the Blaks. Johannes Thuróczy wrote in the Chronica Hungarorum that the Székelys did not forget the Scythian letters and these are engraved on sticks by carving.

Its usage between the 11th and 19th centuries is believed to have been limited, although it featured in folk art of the Early Modern period. The script experienced a revival in the 20th century. Beginning with Adorján Magyar in 1915, the script has been promulgated as a means for writing modern Hungarian.

== See also ==
- Hungarian orthography
- Hungarian braille
- Hungarian phonology
- Old Hungarian Script
- ISO/IEC 8859-2
