= Hungarian phonology =

Sounds and pronunciation of the Hungarian language

The phonology of Hungarian is notable for its process of vowel harmony, the frequent occurrence of geminate consonants and the presence of otherwise uncommon palatal stops.

== Consonants ==
This is the standard Hungarian consonantal system, using symbols from the International Phonetic Alphabet (IPA).

Consonant phonemes of Hungarian
		Labial	Dental	Post- alveolar	Palatal	Velar	Glottal
Nasal		m	n̪		ɲ	(ŋ)	
Plosive	voiceless	p	t		c^{*}	k	
Plosive	voiced	b	d		ɟ^{*}	ɡ	
Affricate	voiceless		t͡s	t͡ʃ	(c͡ç)^{*}		
Affricate	voiced		d͡z	d͡ʒ	(ɟ͡ʝ)^{*}		
Fricative	voiceless	f	s̪	ʃ	(ç)	(x)	h
Fricative	voiced	v	z̪	ʒ	(ʝ)		(ɦ)
Trill			r̪				
Approximant	median				j		
Approximant	lateral		l̪		(ʎ)		

- ^* It is debated whether the palatal consonant pair consists of stops or affricates. They are considered affricates or stops, depending on register, by Tamás Szende, head of the department of General Linguistics at PPKE, and stops by Mária Gósy, research professor, head of the Department of Phonetics at ELTE. The reason for the different analyses is that the relative duration of the friction of /c/ (as compared to the duration of its closure) is longer than those of the stops, but shorter than those of the affricates. /c/ has the stop-like nature of having a full duration no longer than those of other (voiceless) stops such as /p, t, k/ but, considering the average closure time in relation to the friction time of the consonants, its duration structure is somewhat closer to those of the affricates.

Almost every consonant may be geminated, represented in writing by doubling a single letter grapheme: ⟨bb⟩ for [bː], ⟨pp⟩ for [pː], ⟨ss⟩ for [ʃː] etc., or by doubling the first letter of a digraph: ⟨ssz⟩ for [sː], ⟨nny⟩ for [ɲː], etc.

The phonemes /d͡z/ and /d͡ʒ/ can occur in spoken language as geminates: bridzs [brid͡ʒː] ('bridge'). (For the list of examples and exceptions, see Hungarian dz and dzs.)

In the western dialects, /ʎ/ lost its palatal feature and merged with /l/ (alveolar lateral approximant). In the northern dialects, the phoneme /ʎ/ has been preserved.

Hungarian orthography, unlike that of the surrounding Slavic languages, does not use háčky or any other consonant diacritics. Instead, the letters c, s, z are used alone (/t͡s/, /ʃ/, /z/) or combined in the digraphs cs, sz, zs (/t͡ʃ/, /s/, /ʒ/), while y is used only in the digraphs ty, gy, ly, ny as a palatalization marker to write the sounds /c/, /ɟ/, /j/ (formerly /ʎ/), /ɲ/.

The most distinctive allophones are:

- /j/ becomes [ç] if between a voiceless obstruent and a word boundary (e.g. lopj [lopç] 'steal').
- /j/ becomes [ʝ] e.g. between voiced obstruents, such as dobj be [dobʝ bɛ] 'throw (one/some) in'
- /h/ may become [ɦ] between two vowels (e.g. tehát [ˈtɛɦaːt] 'so'), [ç] after front vowels (e.g. ihlet [ˈiçlɛt] 'inspiration'), and [x] word-finally after back vowels (e.g. doh [dox] 'musty') if it is not deleted (which it often is; e.g. méh [meː] 'bee', but even then, some dialects still pronounce it, e.g., [meːx]).
  According to Gósy, it becomes [x] (rather than [ç]) in words such as pech, ihlet, technika ('bad luck, inspiration, technology/technique'), while it becomes postvelar fricative in words such as doh, sah, jacht, Allah, eunuch, potroh.
- /h/ becomes [xː] when geminated, in certain words: dohhal [ˈdoxːɒl] ('with blight'), peches [ˈpɛxːɛʃ] ('unlucky').

Examples
Phoneme	Example		Translation
/p/	pipa	/ˈpipɒ/	'pipe'
/b/	bot	/bot/	'stick'
/t/	toll	/tolː/	'feather', 'pen'
/d/	dob	/dob/	'throw', 'drum'
/k/	kép	/keːp/	'picture'
/ɡ/	gép	/ɡeːp/	'machine'
/f/	fa	/fɒ/	'tree'
/v/	vág	/vaːɡ/	'cut'
/s/	szó	/soː/	'word'
/z/	zöld	/zøld/	'green'
/ʃ/	só	/ʃoː/	'salt'
/ʒ/	zseb	/ʒɛb/	'pocket'
/j/	jó	/joː/	'good'
/h/	hó	/hoː/	'snow'
/t͡s/	cél	/t͡seːl/	'goal', 'target'
/d͡z/	edző	/ˈɛd͡zːøː/	'coach'
/t͡ʃ/	csak	/t͡ʃɒk/	'only'
/d͡ʒ/	dzsessz	/d͡ʒɛsː/	'jazz'
/l/	ló	/loː/	'horse'
/c/	tyúk	/cuːk/	'hen'
/ɟ/	gyár	/ɟaːr/	'factory'
/r/	ró	/roː/	'carve'
/m/	ma	/mɒ/	'today'
/n/	nem	/nɛm/	'no', 'gender'
/ɲ/	nyár	/ɲaːr/	'summer'

== Vowels ==
The vowel phonemes of Hungarian

Hungarian has seven pairs of corresponding short and long vowels. Their phonetic values do not exactly match up with each other, so ⟨e⟩ represents /ɛ/ and ⟨é⟩ represents /eː/; likewise, ⟨a⟩ represents /ɒ/ while ⟨á⟩ represents /aː/. For the other pairs, the short vowels are slightly lower and more central, and the long vowels more peripheral:

- /i, y, u/ are phonetically near-close [ɪ, ʏ, ʊ].
- /eː/ has been variously described as close-mid [eː] and mid [e̞ː].
- /ɛ/ and the marginal /ɛː/ are phonetically near-open [æ, æː], but they may be somewhat less open [ɛ, ɛː] in other dialects.
- /ø/ is phonetically mid [ø̞].
- /aː/ and the marginal /a/ are phonetically open central [äː, ä].

The sound marked by ⟨a⟩ is considered to be [ɒ] by Tamás Szende and [ɔ] by Mária Gósy. Gósy also mentions a different short /a/ that contrasts with both /aː/ and /ɒ/, present in a few words like Svájc ('Switzerland'), svá ('schwa'), advent ('advent'), hardver ('hardware', this usage is considered hyperforeign or simply dated), and halló (used when answering the phone; contrasting with haló 'dying', and háló 'web').

There are two more marginal sounds, namely the long /ɛː/ as well as the long /ɒː/. They are used in the name of the letters E and A, which are pronounced /ɛː/ and /ɒː/, respectively. The adjective fair (as 'equitable') is pronounced in Hungarian with /ɛː/ (it may also be short, though). This sound occurs as an alternative in erre 'this way' (instead of doubling the /r/), just like /ɒː/ in arra 'that way'.

=== e-ë distinction ===
The letter e marks two different historical vowels, colloquially called "open e" (nyílt e) and "closed e" (zárt e). The orthography and standard pronunciation do not differentiate between the two, but many dialects do, with various pronunciations for the two vowels such as /æ/ or /ɛ/ for "open e" and /ɛ/ or /e/ for "closed e". In text that wishes to highlight which of the two vowels is used in which place, the letter e is used for "open e" only, while "closed e" is marked with ë. There are minimal pairs that are distinguished only by the two e vowels. For example, mentek could represent four different words: mëntëk ('you all go'), mëntek ('they went'), mentëk ('I save'), and mentek ('they are exempt'). In Standard Hungarian, the first three collapse to [ˈmɛntɛk], while the latter one is unknown, having a different form in the literary language (mentesek).

e-ë distinction by region
Region	e	ë	Example: ember ("person, human")
Northeastern, Mezőség, Budapest (standard language)	/ɛ/	/ɛ/	/ɛmbɛr/
Western (e.g. Veszprém, Zala, Vas)	/æ/	/ɛ/	/æmbɛr/
Along the Danube, Tiszántúl	/ɛ/	/e/	/ɛmber/
Southern (ë replaced with ö)	/ɛ/	/ø/	/ɛmbør/

=== Vowel examples ===
Examples
Phoneme	Example		
/ɒ/	hat	/hɒt/	'six'
(/ɒː/)	a	/ɒː/	'the letter A'
(/a/)	Svájc	/ʃvajt͡s/	'Switzerland'
/aː/	lát	/laːt/	'see'
/o/	ok	/ok/	'cause'
/oː/	tó	/toː/	'lake'
/u/	fut	/fut/	'run'
/uː/	kút	/kuːt/	'well'
/ɛ/	lesz	/lɛsː/	'will be'
(/ɛː/)	e	/ɛː/	'the letter E'
/eː/	rész	/reːs/	'part'
/i/	visz	/vis/	'carry'
/iː/	víz	/viːz/	'water'
/ø/	sör	/ʃør/	'beer'
/øː/	bőr	/bøːr/	'skin'
/y/	üt	/yt/	'hit'
/yː/	tűz	/tyːz/	'fire'

== Vowel harmony ==
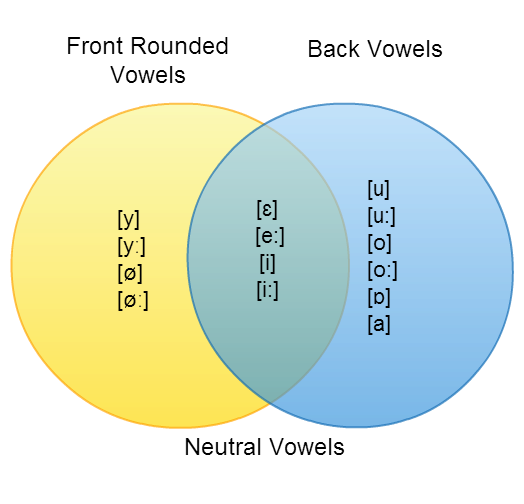
A Venn diagram of Hungarian vowel harmony, featuring front rounded vowels, front unrounded vowels ("neutral" vowels), and back vowels.

As in Finnish, Turkish, and Mongolian, vowel harmony plays an important part in determining the distribution of vowels in a word. Hungarian vowel harmony distinguishes vowels according to front vs. back assonance and rounded vs unrounded for the front vowels. Excluding recent loanwords, words in Hungarian only contain either back vowels or front vowels as a result of vowel harmony.

Hungarian vowel harmony
	Front				Back	
	unrounded		rounded		Back	
	short	long	short	long	short	long
Close	i	iː	y	yː	u	uː
Mid	ɛ	eː	ø	øː	o	oː
Open					ɒ	aː

While /i/, /iː/, /ɛ/, and /eː/ are all front unrounded vowels, they are considered to be "neutral vowels" in Hungarian vowel harmony. Therefore, if a word contains back vowels, neutral vowels may appear alongside them. However, if only neutral vowels appear in a stem, the stem is treated as though it is of front vowel assonance and all suffixes must contain front vowels.

Vowel harmony in Hungarian is most notable when observing suffixation. Vowel harmony must be maintained throughout the entire word, meaning that most suffixes have variants. For example, the dative case marker [nɒk] vs. [nɛk]. Stems that contain back vowels affix back vowel suffixes, and stems that contain only front vowels affix front vowel suffixes. However, the front vowel stems distinguish rounded vs. unroundedness based on the last vowel in the stem. If the last vowel is front and rounded, it takes a suffix with a front rounded vowel; otherwise it follows the standard rules. While suffixes for most words have front/back vowel variants, there are not many that have rounded/unrounded variants, indicating that this is a rarer occurrence.

One is able to observe the distinction when looking at the plural affix, either [-ok] (back), [-ɛk] (front unrounded), or [-øk] (front rounded).

Hungarian vowel harmony and suffixation
Stem	Plural	Stem gloss	Vowels in stem	Vowel in suffix
/ˈɒstɒl/ asztal	/ˈɒstɒlok/ asztal-ok	“table”	Only back vowels	/o/
/ˈpɒpiːr/ papír	/ˈpɒpiːrok/ papír-ok	“paper”	Back vowel with neutral vowel	/o/
/ˈfyzet/ füzet	/ˈfyzetek/ füzet-ek	“notebook”	Only front vowels, last vowel unrounded.	/e/
/ˈɟerek/ gyerek	/ˈɟerekek/ gyerek-ek	“child”	Only neutral (front) vowels, last vowel unrounded.	/e/
/ˈiʃmerøːʃ/ ismerős	/ˈiʃmerøːʃøk/ ismerős-ök	“acquaintance”	Only front vowels, last vowel rounded.	/ø/

As can be seen above, the neutral vowels occur in both front and back vowel assonance words. However, there are about fifty monosyllabic roots that only contain [i], [iː], or [eː] that take a back vowel suffix instead of the front vowel suffix.

Irregular suffixation
Stem	Gloss	"At"	"From"
híd	bridge	híd-nál	híd-tól
cél	aim	cél-nál	cél-tól

These exceptions to the rule are hypothesized to have originated from roots originally having contained a phoneme no longer present in modern Hungarian, the unrounded back vowel /ɨ/, or its long counterpart /ɨː/. It is theorized that while these vowels merged with /i/ or /iː/, less commonly /eː/ or /uː/, the vowel harmony rules sensitive to the backness of the original sound remained in place. The theory finds support from etymology: related words in other languages generally have back vowels, often specifically unrounded back vowels. For example, nyíl 'arrow' (plural nyíl-ak) corresponds to Komi ньыл /nʲɨl/, Southern Mansi /nʲʌːl/.

== Assimilation ==
The overall characteristics of the consonant assimilation in Hungarian are the following:

- Assimilation types are typically regressive, that is the last element of the cluster determines the change.
- In most cases, it works across word boundaries if the sequence of words form an "accentual unity", that is there is no phonetic break between them (and they bear a common phrase stress). Typical accentual units are:
  - attributes and qualified nouns, e.g. hideg tél [hidɛk‿teːl] ('cold winter');
  - adverbs and qualified attributes, e.g. nagyon káros [nɒɟoŋ‿kaːroʃ] ~ [nɒɟon‿kaːroʃ] ('very harmful');
  - verbs and their complements, e.g. nagyot dob [nɒɟod‿dob] ('s/he throws long toss'), vesz belőle [vɛz‿bɛløːlɛ] ('take some [of it]').
- There are obligatory, optional and stigmatized types of assimilation.
- The palatal affricates behave like stops in assimilation processes. Therefore, in this section, they will be treated as stops, including their IPA notations [ɟ] and [c].

=== Voice assimilation ===
In a cluster of consonants ending in an obstruent, all obstruents change their voicing according to the last one of the sequence. The affected obstruents are the following:

- In obstruent clusters, retrograde voicing assimilation occurs, even across word boundaries:

Voiced	Voiceless	Undergoes devoicing	Undergoes voicing	Causes voicing	Causes devoicing
b /b/	p /p/	dobtam [ˈdoptɒm] 'I threw (it)'	képzés [ˈkeːbzeːʃ] 'training, forming'	futball [ˈfudbɒlː] 'soccer'	központ [ˈkøspont] 'center'
d /d/	t /t/	adhat [ˈɒthɒt] 's/he can give'	hétből [ˈheːdbøːl] 'from 7'	csapda [ˈt͡ʃɒbdɒ] 'trap'	pénztár [ˈpeːnstaːr] 'cash desk'
dz /d͡z/	c /t͡s/	edzhet [ˈɛt͡shɛt] 's/he can train'	ketrecben [ˈkɛtrɛd͡zbɛn] 'in (a) cage'	alapdzadzíki [ˈɒlɒbd͡zɒd͡ziːki] 'standard tzatziki'	abcúg! [ˈɒpt͡suːɡ] 'down with him!'
dzs /d͡ʒ/	cs /t͡ʃ/	bridzstől [ˈbrit͡ʃtøːl] '(because) of bridge [game of cards]'	ácsból [ˈaːd͡ʒboːl] 'from (a) carpenter'	barackdzsem [ˈbɒrɒd͡zɡd͡ʒɛm] ~ [bɒrɒd͡ʒːɛm] 'apricot jam'	távcső [ˈtaːft͡ʃøː] 'telescope'
g /ɡ/	k /k/	fogtam [ˈfoktɒm] 'I held (it)'	zsákból [ˈʒaːɡboːl] 'out of (a) bag'	állítgat [ˈaːlːiːdɡɒt] 's/he constantly adjusts'	zsebkendő [ˈʒɛpkɛndøː] 'handkerchief'
gy /ɟ/	ty /c/	ágytól [ˈaːctoːl] 'from (a) bed'	pintyből [ˈpiɲɟbøːl] 'from (a) finch'	gépgyár [ˈɡeːbɟaːr] 'machine factory'	lábtyű [ˈlaːpcyː] 'socks with sleeves for the toes'
v /v/	f /f/	szívtam [ˈsiːftɒm] 'I smoked/sucked (it)'	széfben [ˈseːvbɛn] 'in (a) safe'	^{*}	lábfej [ˈlaːpfɛj] 'part of the foot below the ankle'
z /z/	sz /s/	méztől [ˈmeːstøːl] 'from honey'	mészből [ˈmeːzbøːl] 'out of lime'	alapzat [ˈɒlɒbzɒt] 'base(ment)'	rabszolga [ˈrɒpsolɡɒ] 'slave'
zs /ʒ/	s /ʃ/	rúzstól [ˈruːʃtoːl] 'from lipstick'	hasba [ˈhɒʒbɒ] 'in(to) (the) stomach'	köldökzsinór [ˈkøldøɡʒinoːr] 'umbilical cord'	különbség [ˈkylømpʃeːɡ] ~ [ˈkylømʃeːɡ] 'difference'
—N/a	h /h/	—N/a	—N/a	—N/a	adhat [ˈɒthɒt] 's/he can give'

- /v/ is unusual in that it undergoes devoicing, but does not cause voicing, e.g. hatvan ('sixty') is pronounced [ˈhɒtvɒn] not *[ˈhɒdvɒn]. Voicing before [v] occurs only in south-western dialects, though it is stigmatized.
- Conversely, /h/ causes devoicing, but never undergoes voicing in consonant clusters. e.g. dohból [ˈdoxboːl] 'from (the) musty smell'.
- Other than a few foreign words, morpheme-initial /d͡z/ does not occur (even its phonemic state is highly debated), therefore it is hard to find a real example when it induces voicing (even alapdzadzíki is forced and not used colloquially). However, the regressive voice assimilation before /d͡z/ does occur even in nonsense sound sequences.

=== Nasal place assimilation ===
Nasals assimilate to the place of articulation of the following consonant (even across word boundaries):

- only [ŋ] precedes a velar consonant (e.g. hang [hɒŋɡ], 'voice'), [ɱ] precedes a labiodental consonant (e.g. hamvad [ˈhɒɱvɒd], 'smolder'), and [m] precedes bilabial consonants.
  - [m] before labial consonants /p b m/: színpad [ˈsiːmpɒd] ('stage'), különb [ˈkylømb] ('better than'), énmagam [ˈeːmːɒɡɒm] ('myself');
  - [ɱ] before labiodental consonants /f v/: különféle [ˈkyløɱfeːlɛ] ('various'), hamvas [ˈhɒɱvɒʃ] ('bloomy');
  - [ɲ] before palatal consonants /c ɟ ɲ/: pinty [piɲc] ('finch'), ángy [aːɲɟ] ('wife of a close male relative'), magánnyomozó [ˈmɒɡaːɲːomozoː] ('private detective');
  - [ŋ] before velar consonants /k ɡ/: munka [ˈmuŋkɒ] ('work'), angol [ˈɒŋɡol] ('English');
- Nasal place assimilation is obligatory within the word, but optional across a word or compound boundary, e.g. szénpor [ˈseːmpor] ~ [ˈseːnpor] ('coal-dust'), nagyon káros [ˈnɒɟoŋ‿ˈkaːroʃ] ~ [ˈnɒɟon‿ˈkaːroʃ] ('very harmful'), olyan más [ˈojɒm‿ˈmaːʃ] ~ [ˈojɒn‿ˈmaːʃ] ('so different').

=== Sibilant assimilation ===
- Voiceless sibilants form a voiceless geminate affricate with preceding alveolar and palatal stops (d /d/, gy /ɟ/, t /t/, ty /c/):
  - Clusters ending in sz /s/ or c /t͡s/ give [t͡sː]: metszet [mɛt͡sːɛt] 'engraving, segment', ötödször [øtøt͡sːør] 'for the fifth time', négyszer [neːt͡sːɛr] 'four times', füttyszó [fyt͡sːoː] 'whistle (as a signal)'; átcipel [aːt͡sːipɛl] 's/he lugs (something) over', nádcukor [naːt͡sːukor] 'cane-sugar'.
  - Clusters ending in s /ʃ/ or cs /t͡ʃ/ give [t͡ʃː]: kétség [keːt͡ʃːeːɡ] 'doubt', fáradság [faːrɒt͡ʃːaːɡ] 'trouble', egység [ɛt͡ʃːeːɡ] 'unity', hegycsúcs [hɛt͡ʃːuːt͡ʃ] 'mountain-top'.
- Two sibilant fricatives form a geminate of the latter phoneme; the assimilation is regressive as usual:
  - sz /s/ or z /z/ + s /ʃ/ gives [ʃː]: egészség [ɛɡeːʃːeːɡ] 'health', község [køʃːeːɡ] 'village, community';
  - sz /s/ or z /z/ + zs /ʒ/ gives [ʒː]: vadászzsákmány [vɒdaːʒːaːkmaːɲ] 'hunter's game'; száraz zsömle [saːrɒʒ‿ʒømlɛ] 'dry bread roll';
  - s /ʃ/ or zs /ʒ/ + sz /s/ gives [sː]: kisszerű [kisːɛryː] 'petty', rozsszalma [rosːɒlmɒ] 'rye straw';
  - s /ʃ/ or zs /ʒ/ + z /z/ gives [zː]: tilos zóna [tiloz‿zoːnɒ] 'restricted zone', parázs zene [pɒraːz‿zɛnɛ] 'hot music'.
  - Clusters zs+s [ʃː], s+zs [ʒː], z+sz [sː] and sz+z [zː] are rather the subject of the voice assimilation.
- If one of the two adjacent sibilants is an affricate, the first one changes its place of articulation, e.g. malacság [mɒlɒt͡ʃːaːɡ], halászcsárda [hɒlaːʃt͡ʃaːrdɒ] 'Hungarian fish restaurant'. Sibilant affricate–fricative sequences like /t͡ʃʃ/ are pronounced the same as geminate affricate [t͡ʃː] during normal speech.
- Sibilant assimilation can be omitted in articulated speech, e.g. to avoid homophony: rozsszalma [rosːɒlmɒ] ~ [roʃsɒlmɒ] 'rye straw' ≠ rossz szalma [ros‿sɒlmɒ] 'straw of bad quality', and rossz alma [rosː‿ɒlmɒ] 'apple of bad quality' as well.
- NB. Letter cluster szs can be read either as sz+s [ʃː], e.g. egészség [ɛɡeːʃːeːɡ] 'health', or as s+zs [ʒː], e.g. liszteszsák [listɛʒːaːk] 'bolting-bag' depending on the actual morpheme boundary. Similarly zsz is either zs + z [zː], e.g. varázszár [vɒraːzːaːr] 'magic lock', or z + sz [sː], e.g. házszám [haːsːaːm] 'street-number'; and csz: cs + z [d͡ʒz] ~ c + sz [t͡ss]. Moreover, single digraphs may prove to be two adjacent letters on morpheme boundary, like cs: cs [t͡ʃ] ~ c + s [t͡ʃʃ]; sz: sz [s] ~ s + z [zː], zs: zs [ʒ] ~ z + s [ʃː].

=== Palatal assimilation ===
Combination of a "palatalizable" consonant and a following palatal consonant results in a palatal geminate. Palatalizable consonants are palatal ones and their non-palatal counterparts: d /d/ ~ gy /ɟ/, l /l/ ~ ly /j/, n /n/ ~ ny /ɲ/, t /t/ ~ ty /c/.

- Full palatal assimilation occurs when the ending palatal consonant is j /j/: nagyja [nɒɟːɒ] 'most of it', adja [ɒɟːɒ] 's/he gives it'; tolja [tojːɒ] 's/he pushes it'; unja [uɲːɒ] 's/he is bored with it', hányja [haːɲːɒ] 's/he throws it'; látja [laːcːɒ] 's/he sees it', atyja [ɒcːɒ] 'his/her father'. The cluster lyj [jː] is a simple orthographic variant of jj [jː]: folyjon [fojːon] 'let it flow'.
- Partial assimilation takes place if an alveolar stop (d, t) is followed by a palatal gy /ɟ/, ty /c/: hadgyakorlat [hɒɟːɒkorlɒt] 'army exercises', nemzetgyűlés [nɛmzɛɟːyːleːʃ] 'national assembly'; vadtyúk [vɒcːuːk] 'wild chicken', hat tyúk [hɒc‿cuːk] 'six hens'.
- Some sources report that alveolar stops change into their palatal counterparts before ny /ɲ/: lúdnyak [luːɟɲɒk] 'neck of a goose', átnyúlik [aːcɲuːlik] 'it extends over'. The majority of the sources do not mention this kind of assimilation.
- When the first consonant is nasal, the partial palatal assimilation is a form of the nasal place assimilation (see above).
- The full palatal assimilation is an obligatory feature in standard Hungarian: its omission is stigmatized and it is considered as a hypercorrection of an undereducated person. Partial palatal assimilation is optional in articulated speech.

=== Degemination ===
Long consonants become short when preceded or followed by another consonant, e.g. folttal [foltɒl] 'by/with (a) patch', varrtam [vɒrtɒm] 'I sewed'.

=== Intercluster elision ===
The middle alveolar stops may be omitted in clusters with more than two consonants, depending on speed and articulation of speech: azt hiszem [ɒs‿hisɛm] ~ [ɒst‿hisɛm] ~[ɒs‿sɛm] I presume/guess', mindnyájan [miɲːaːjɒn] 'one and all', különbség [kylømpʃeːɡ] ~ [kylømʃeːɡ] 'difference'. In morpheme onsets like str- [ʃtr], middle stops tends to be more stable in educated speech, falanxstratégia [fɒlɒnʃtrɒteːɡiɒ] ~ [fɒlɒŋkʃtrɒteːɡiɒ] ~ [fɒlɒŋksʃtrɒteːɡiɒ] 'strategy based on phalanxes'.

=== Elision of [l] ===
- /l/ assimilates to a following /r/ (e.g. balra [ˈbɒrːɒ], 'to the left').

/l/ also tends to be omitted between a preceding vowel and an adjacent stop or affricate in rapid speech, causing the lengthening of the vowel or diphthongization (e.g. volt [voːt] 'was', polgár [ˈpoːɡaːr] 'citizen'). This is quite common in dialectal speech, but considered non-standard in the official language.

=== Hiatus ===
Standard Hungarian prefers hiatus between adjacent vowels. However some optional dissolving features can be observed:

- An optional weak glide [j̆] may be pronounced within a word (or a compound element) between two adjacent vowels if one of them is i [i], e.g. fiaiéi [ˈfiɒieːi] ~ [ˈfij̆ɒj̆ij̆eːj̆i] ('the ones of his/her sons'). This, however, is rarely transcribed.
- Adjacent identical short vowels other than a and e may be pronounced as the corresponding long vowel, e.g. zoológia [ˈzo.oloːɡiɒ] ~ [ˈzoːloːɡiɒ] ('zoology').
- Adjacent double i is always pronounced as single short [i] in the word endings, e.g. Hawaii [ˈhɒvɒi]. This reduction is reflected in the current orthography when the adjective-forming suffix -i is added to a noun ending in i. In this case suffix -i is omitted also in writing. e.g. Lenti (a placename) + -i → lenti 'of Lenti'.

== Stress ==
The stress is on the first syllable of the word. The articles a, az, egy, and the particle is are usually unstressed.

== Bibliography ==
- Gósy, Mária (2004), Fonetika, a beszéd tudománya ('Phonetics, the Study of Speech'), Budapest: Osiris, ISBN 963-389-666-5
- Kráľ, Ábel (1988), Pravidlá slovenskej výslovnosti, Bratislava: Slovenské pedagogické nakladateľstvo
- Rounds, Carol (2001), "Vowel harmony", Hungarian : An Essential Grammar, Routledge, ISBN 9780415226127
- Rounds, Carol (2009), Hungarian: An Essential Grammar (2nd ed.), New York: Routledge, ISBN 978-0-203-88619-9
- Siptár, Péter; Törkenczy, Miklós (2007), The Phonology of Hungarian, The Phonology of the World's Languages, Oxford University Press
- Szende, Tamás (1994), "Illustrations of the IPA: Hungarian", Journal of the International Phonetic Association, 24 (2): 91–94, doi:10.1017/S0025100300005090, S2CID 242632087
- Vago, Robert M. (1980), The Sound Pattern of Hungarian, Washington, D.C.: Georgetown University Press
- Vago, Robert M. (1976), "Theoretical Implications of Hungarian Vowel Harmony", Linguistic Inquiry, 7 (2): 243–63, JSTOR 4177921
