= DZS (disambiguation) =

DZS may refer to:

== Companies and organizations ==
- DZS, a US telecommunications company
- The Croatian Bureau of Statistics, Državni zavod za statistiku
- Detroit Zoological Society, operators of the Detroit Zoo

== Other ==
- dzs, a trigraph in the Hungarian language
