= Dž =

Latin digraph used in Serbo-Croatian

D with caron
- Ǆ, DŽ, ǅ, D, , d

Usage
- Type: alphabetic
- Language of origin: Serbo-Croatian
- Sound values: [dʒ]

History
Development
K1K2O31Z4
  - ,
    - ,
      - Δ δ, Ζ ζ
        - 𐌃, 𐌆
          - D d, Z z
            - D d, Ż ż
              - D d, Ž ž
- Transliterations: Џ џ; dzs
- Variations: Ǆ, DŽ, ǅ, D, , d

^{Dž in two different fonts}

Dž (titlecase form; all-capitals form DŽ, lowercase dž) is a digraph of the Latin script. In Serbo-Croatian, it is treated as the seventh letter of Gaj's Latin alphabet, being placed after D and before Đ.

It is pronounced [ɖʐ] or [d͡ʒ], like "j" in English. Dž is a digraph that corresponds to the letter Dzhe (Џ/џ) of the Serbian Cyrillic alphabet and Macedonian Cyrillic alphabet. It is also the tenth letter of the Slovak alphabet. Although several other languages (see below) also use the letter combination DŽ, they treat it as a pair of the letters D and Ž, not as a single distinct letter.

When the letter is the initial of a capitalised word (like Džungla or Džemper, or personal names like Džemal or Džamonja), the ž is not uppercase. Only when the whole word is written in uppercase, is the Ž capitalised.

The capitalized version of this letter ('Ǆ'), as a single character in Unicode, is also the largest character amongst every Latin character in size (in blocks Basic Latin, Latin Extended-A, Latin Extended-B).

== Treatment as a single letter ==
In Gaj's Latin alphabet (used for Serbo-Croatian), when the text is written vertically rather than horizontally (on signs, for instance), dž is written horizontally as a single letter; in particular, dž occupies a single square in crossword puzzles. Also, in cases where words are written with a space between each letter, dž is written together without a space between d and ž. These characteristics are also shared by Lj and Nj. Similarly, when a name beginning with Dž is reduced to initial, the entire letter is initial, not just D. For example, Dženan Ljubović becomes Dž. Lj. and not D. L. This behaviour is not the case in Slovak, where it is split into D/d and Ž/ž. The same letter Dž is part of the Macedonian Latin alphabet.

Czech does have the sound d͡ʒ, but in native Czech words it only occurs as a replacement of [t͡ʃ] before other voiced consonants. Therefore, [t͡ʃ] and [d͡ʒ] are written in native words using the same letter č. This is not possible in loanwords, and Czech adopted the Dž orthography in this case (for example džus). In this case, the two letters are always split when text is written vertically. Lithuanian and Latvian similarly use Dž for the sound [d͡ʒ] without considering it a separate letter. In Lithuanian, dž is palatalized to [dʑ] when followed by e, ę, ė, i, į or y.

Letter "Dž" is found in Unicode at code points U+01C4 (uppercase, Ǆ), U+01C5 (titlecase, ǅ), and U+01C6 (lowercase, ǆ). Unicode representations of the letter are very rarely used in digital media, which tends to favor the corresponding two-character combinations. Manufacturers of computer keyboards and typewriters for Croatian users typically do not provide a single key for the letter. X keyboard extension provides latinunicode keyboard layouts for entering Unicode representation of the letter on standard Croatian keyboard.

== See also ==
- Dz
- Џ џ : Cyrillic Dzhe
- Dzs: the Hungarian trigraph letter of the same sound

== Sources ==
- Hrvatski pravopis - Slova (in Croatian)
