= Digraph (orthography) =

Pair of characters used to write one phoneme

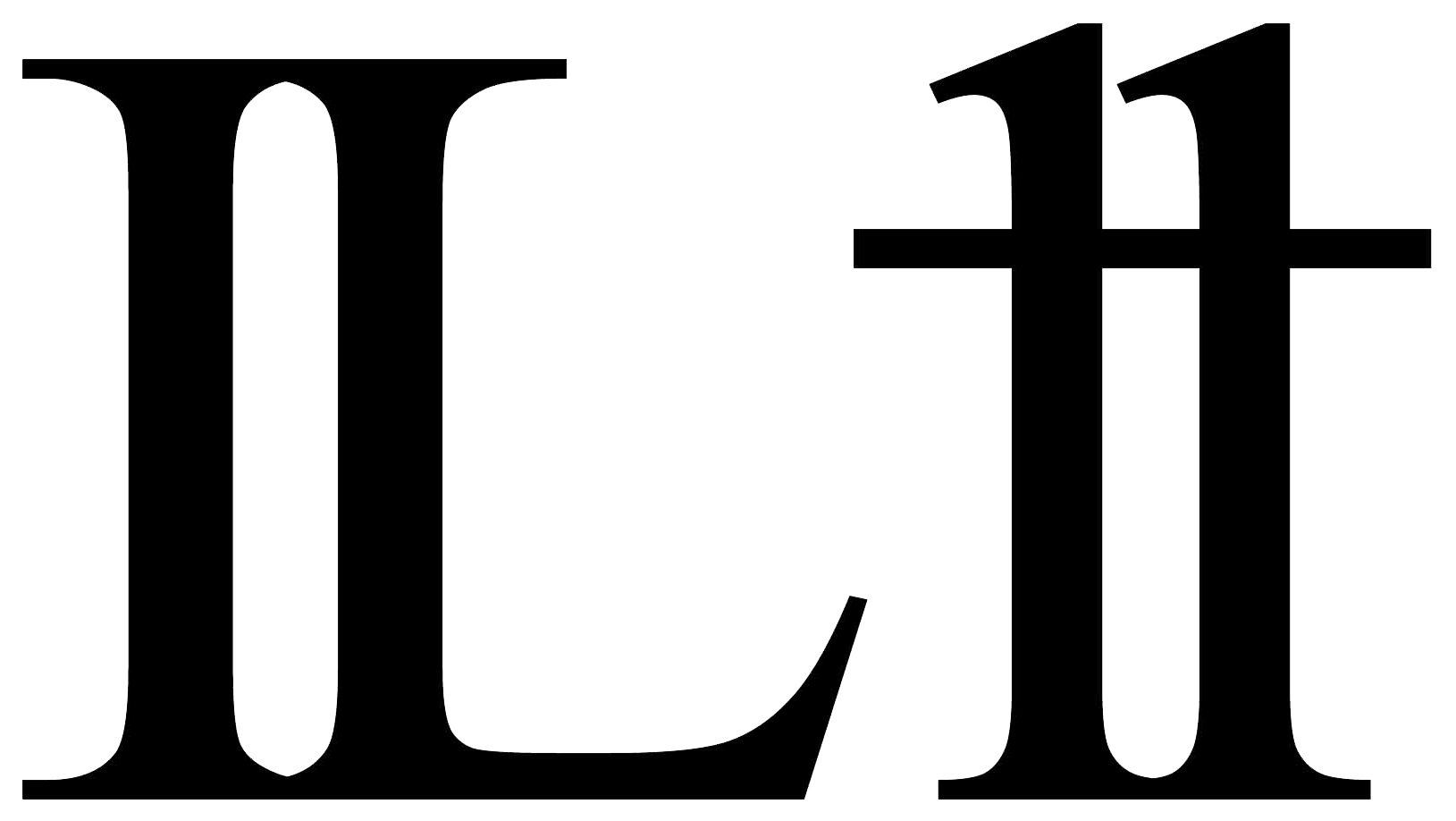
In Welsh, the digraph ⟨ll⟩ fused for a time into a ligature.

A digraph (from Ancient Greek δίς (dís) 'double' and γράφω (gráphō) 'to write') or digram is a pair of characters used in the orthography of a language to write either a single phoneme (distinct sound), or a sequence of phonemes that does not correspond to the normal values of the two characters combined.

Some digraphs represent phonemes that cannot be represented with a single character in the writing system of a language, like ⟨ch⟩ in Spanish chico and ocho. Other digraphs represent phonemes that can also be represented by single characters. A digraph that shares its pronunciation with a single character may be a relic from an earlier period of the language when the digraph had a different pronunciation, or may represent a distinction that is made only in certain dialects, like the English ⟨wh⟩. Some such digraphs are used for purely etymological reasons, like ⟨ph⟩ in French.

In some orthographies, a digraph (or a trigraph) is considered to constitute a letter, which means that it has its own place in the alphabet and cannot be separated into its constituent graphemes for purposes of sorting, abbreviating, or hyphenating words. Digraphs are used in some romanization schemes, e.g. ⟨zh⟩ as a romanisation of Russian ⟨ж⟩.

The capitalisation of digraphs can vary, e.g. ⟨sz⟩ in Polish is capitalized ⟨Sz⟩, and ⟨kj⟩ in Norwegian is capitalized ⟨Kj⟩, while ⟨ĳ⟩ in Dutch is capitalized ⟨Ĳ⟩ and word initial ⟨dt⟩ in Irish is capitalized ⟨dT⟩.

Digraphs may also develop into ligatures, but the two concepts are distinct; a digraph's essential feature is its sound, while a ligature is visual, graphically fusing two characters into one, e.g. when ⟨o⟩ and ⟨e⟩ become ⟨œ⟩, e.g. as in French cœur "heart".

== Homogeneous digraph ==
Digraphs may consist of two different characters (heterogeneous digraphs) or two instances of the same character (homogeneous digraphs). In the latter case, they are generally called double (or doubled) letters.

Doubled vowel letters are commonly used to indicate a long vowel sound. This is the case in Finnish and Estonian, for instance, where ⟨uu⟩ represents a longer version of the vowel denoted by ⟨u⟩, ⟨ää⟩ represents a longer version of the vowel denoted by ⟨ä⟩, and so on. In Middle English, the sequences ⟨ee⟩ and ⟨oo⟩ were used in a similar way, to represent lengthened "e" and "o" sounds respectively; both spellings have been retained in modern English orthography, but the Great Vowel Shift and other historical sound changes mean that the modern pronunciations are quite different from the original ones.

Doubled consonant letters can also be used to indicate a long or geminated consonant sound. In Italian, for example, consonants written double are pronounced longer than single ones. This was the original use of doubled consonant letters in Old English, but during the Middle English and Early Modern English period, phonemic consonant length was lost and a spelling convention developed in which a doubled consonant serves to indicate that a preceding vowel is to be pronounced short. In modern English, for example, the ⟨pp⟩ of tapping differentiates the first vowel sound from that of taping. In rare cases, doubled consonant letters represent a true geminate consonant in modern English; this may occur when two instances of the same consonant come from different morphemes, for example ⟨nn⟩ in unnatural (un+natural) or ⟨tt⟩ in cattail (cat+tail).

In some cases, the sound represented by a doubled consonant letter is distinguished in some other way than length from the sound of the corresponding single consonant letter:

- In Welsh and Greenlandic, ⟨ll⟩ stands for a voiceless lateral consonant, while in Spanish and Catalan it stands for a palatal consonant.
- In several languages of western Europe, including English, French, Portuguese and Catalan, the digraph ⟨ss⟩ is used between vowels to represent the voiceless sibilant /s/, since an ⟨s⟩ alone between vowels normally represents the voiced sibilant /z/.
- In Spanish, Portuguese, Catalan and Basque, ⟨rr⟩ is used between vowels for what is traditionally an alveolar trill /r/, since an ⟨r⟩ alone between vowels represents an alveolar flap /ɾ/ (the two are different phonemes in those languages).
- In Spanish, the digraph ⟨nn⟩ formerly indicated /ɲ/ (a palatal nasal); it developed into the letter ñ.
- In Basque, double consonant letters generally mark palatalized versions of the single consonant letter, as in ⟨dd⟩, ⟨ll⟩, ⟨tt⟩. However, ⟨rr⟩ is a trill that contrasts with the single-letter flap, as in Spanish, and the palatal version of ⟨n⟩ is written ⟨ñ⟩.
- In the Revised Romanization of Korean, ⟨pp tt jj kk ss⟩ indicate so-called "tense" consonants. This parallels the usage of doubling in Hangul.

In several European writing systems, including the English one, the doubling of the letter ⟨c⟩ or ⟨k⟩ is represented as the heterogeneous digraph ⟨ck⟩ instead of ⟨cc⟩ or ⟨kk⟩ respectively. In native German words, the doubling of ⟨z⟩, which corresponds to /ts/, is replaced by the digraph ⟨tz⟩.

== Pan-dialectical digraphs ==
Some languages have a unified orthography with digraphs that represent distinct pronunciations in different dialects (diaphonemes). For example, in Breton there is a digraph ⟨zh⟩ that represents [z] in most dialects, but [h] in Vannetais. Similarly, the Saintongeais dialect of French has a digraph ⟨jh⟩ that represents [h] in words that correspond to [ʒ] in standard French. Similarly, Catalan has a digraph ⟨ix⟩ that represents [ʃ] in Eastern Catalan, but [jʃ] or [js] in Western Catalan–Valencian.

== Split digraphs ==
The pair of letters making up a phoneme are not always adjacent. This is the case with English silent e. For example, the sequence a_e has the sound /eɪ/ in English cake. This is the result of three historical sound changes: cake was originally /kakə/, the open syllable /ka/ came to be pronounced with a long vowel, and later the final schwa dropped off, leaving /kaːk/. Later still, the vowel /aː/ became /eɪ/. There are six such digraphs in English, ⟨a_e, e_e, i_e, o_e, u_e, y_e⟩.

However, alphabets may also be designed with discontinuous digraphs. In the Tatar Cyrillic alphabet, for example, the letter ю is used to write both /ju/ and /jy/. Usually the difference is evident from the rest of the word, but when it is not, the sequence ю...ь is used for /jy/, as in юнь /jyn/ 'cheap'.

The Indic alphabets are distinctive for their discontinuous vowels, such as Thai เ...อ /ɤː/ in เธอ /tʰɤː/ 'you/she'. Technically, however, they may be considered diacritics, not full letters; whether they are digraphs is thus a matter of definition.

== Ambiguous letter sequences ==
Some letter pairs are not digraphs but might be interpreted as digraphs because of compounding: e.g. hogshead and cooperate (the latter case of vowel hiatus is also called diaeresis). In English, they are often unmarked and must therefore be memorized, or more likely deduced, as exceptions. Some authors, however, indicate it either by breaking up the digraph with a hyphen, as in hogs-head, co-operate, or, in case of a vowel hiatus, with a diaeresis diacritic mark, as in coöperate (this use of two dots in English is now archaic but continues to be used extensively in some other languages). When it occurs in names such as Clapham, Townshend, and Hartshorne, it is never marked in any way. Positional alternative glyphs may help to disambiguate in certain cases: when round ⟨s⟩ was used as a final variant of long ⟨ſ⟩, and the English digraph for /ʃ/ would always be ⟨ſh⟩.

Similar ambiguity also occurs frequently in German, where it is also unmarked and left to the reader to deduce.

In Romansh, a hyphen is used to distinguish ⟨s-ch⟩ from ⟨sch⟩.

In Dutch, a diaresis is frequently used to parse ⟨eee⟩.

In romanization of Japanese, the constituent sounds (morae) are usually indicated by digraphs, but some are indicated by a single letter, and some with a trigraph. The case of ambiguity is the syllabic ん (or ン), which is written as n (or sometimes m), except before vowels or y where it is followed by an apostrophe as n’. For example, the given name じゅんいちろう is romanized as Jun’ichirō, so that it is parsed as "Ju-n-i-chi-rou", rather than as "Ju-ni-chi-rou". A similar use of the apostrophe is seen in pinyin where 嫦娥 is written Chang'e because the g belongs to the final (-ang) of the first syllable, not to the initial of the second syllable. Without the apostrophe, Change would be understood as the syllable chan (final -an) followed by the syllable ge (initial g-).

== In alphabetization ==
In some languages, certain digraphs and trigraphs are counted as distinct letters in themselves, and assigned to a specific place in the alphabet, separate from that of the sequence of characters that composes them, for purposes of orthography and collation:

- In the Gaj's Latin alphabet used to write Serbo-Croatian, the digraphs ⟨dž⟩, ⟨lj⟩ and ⟨nj⟩, which correspond to the single Cyrillic letters ⟨џ⟩, ⟨љ⟩, ⟨њ⟩, are treated as distinct letters.
- In the Czech and Slovak alphabet, ⟨ch⟩ is treated as a distinct letter, coming after ⟨h⟩ in the alphabet. Also, in the Slovak alphabet the relatively rare digraphs ⟨dz⟩ and ⟨dž⟩ are treated as distinct letters.
- In the Danish and Norwegian alphabet, the former digraph ⟨aa⟩, where it appears in older names, is sorted as if it were the letter ⟨å⟩, which replaced it.
- In the Norwegian alphabet, there are several digraphs and letter combinations representing an isolated sound.
- In the Dutch alphabet, the digraph ⟨ij⟩ is sometimes written as a ligature and may be sorted with ⟨y⟩ (in the Netherlands, though not usually in Belgium); however, regardless of where it is used, when a Dutch word starting with ⟨ij⟩ is capitalized, the entire digraph is capitalized (IJmeer, IJmuiden). Other Dutch digraphs are never treated as single letters.
- In Hungarian, the digraphs ⟨cs⟩, ⟨dz⟩, ⟨gy⟩, ⟨ly⟩, ⟨ny⟩, ⟨sz⟩, ⟨ty⟩, ⟨zs⟩, and the trigraph ⟨dzs⟩, have their own places in the alphabet (where e.g. ⟨ny⟩ comes right after ⟨n⟩)
- In Spanish, the digraphs ⟨ch⟩ and ⟨ll⟩ were formerly treated as distinct letters, but are now split into their constituent letters.
- In Welsh, the alphabet includes the digraphs ⟨ch⟩, ⟨dd⟩, ⟨ff⟩, ⟨ll⟩, ⟨ng⟩, ⟨ph⟩, ⟨rh⟩, ⟨th⟩. However, ⟨mh⟩, ⟨nh⟩ and ⟨ngh⟩, which represent mutated voiceless consonants, are not treated as distinct letters.
- In the romanization of several Slavic languages that use the Cyrillic script, letters like ш, ж, and ю might be written as sh, zh and yu, however sometimes the result of the romanization might modify a letter to be a diacritical letter instead of a digraph.
- In Maltese, two digraphs are used, ⟨għ⟩ which comes right after ⟨g⟩, and ⟨ie⟩ which comes right after ⟨i⟩.

Most other languages, including most of the Romance languages, treat digraphs as combinations of separate letters for alphabetization purposes.

== Examples ==
=== Latin script ===
==== English ====
English has both homogeneous digraphs (doubled letters) and heterogeneous digraphs (digraphs consisting of two different letters). Those of the latter type include the following:

- ⟨sc⟩ normally represents /s/ (voiceless alveolar fricative - scene) or /ʃ/ (voiceless postalveolar fricative - conscious) before ⟨e⟩ or ⟨i⟩.
- ⟨ng⟩ can represent /ŋ/ (velar nasal) as in thing.
- ⟨ch⟩ usually corresponds to /tʃ/ (voiceless postalveolar affricate - church), to /k/ (voiceless velar plosive) when used as an etymological digraph in words of Greek origin (christ), less commonly to /ʃ/ (voiceless postalveolar fricative) in words of French origin (champagne).
- ⟨ck⟩ corresponds to /k/ as in check.
- ⟨gh⟩ represents /ɡ/ (voiced velar plosive) at the beginning of words (ghost) or at the end of words can represent either /f/ (voiceless labiodental fricative in enough) or is silent (sigh).
- ⟨ph⟩ represents /f/ (voiceless labiodental fricative), as in siphon.
- ⟨rh⟩ represents English /r/ in words of Greek origin, such as rhythm.
- ⟨sh⟩ represents /ʃ/ (voiceless postalveolar fricative), as in sheep.
- ⟨ti⟩ usually represents /ʃ/ word-medially before a vowel, as in education.
- ⟨th⟩ usually corresponds to /θ/ (voiceless interdental fricative) in thin or /ð/ (voiced interdental fricative) in then. See also Pronunciation of English ⟨th⟩.
- ⟨wh⟩ represents /hw/ in some conservative dialects; /w/ in other dialects (while); and /h/ in a few words in which it is followed by ⟨o⟩, such as who and whole. See also Phonological history of ⟨wh⟩.
- ⟨zh⟩ represents /ʒ/ in words transliterated from Slavic languages, and in American dictionary pronunciation spelling.
- ⟨ci⟩ usually appears as /ʃ/ before vowels, like in facial and artificial. Otherwise it is /si/ as in fancier and icier or /sɪ/ as in acid and rancid.
- ⟨wr⟩ represents /r/. Originally, it stood for a labialized sound, while ⟨r⟩ without ⟨w⟩ was non-labialized, but the distinction has been lost in most dialects, the two sounds merging into a single alveolar approximant, allophonically labialized at the start of syllables, as in red [ɹʷɛd]. See also rhotic consonant.
- ⟨qu⟩ usually represents /kw/; ⟨q⟩ is conventionally followed by ⟨u⟩ and a vowel letter as in quick, with some exceptions.

Digraphs may also be composed of vowels. Some letters ⟨a, e, o⟩ are preferred for the first position, others for the second ⟨i, u⟩. The latter have allographs ⟨y, w⟩ in English orthography.

English vocalic digraphs
second letter → first letter ↓	⟨...e⟩	⟨...i⟩ ¦ ⟨...y⟩	⟨...u⟩ ¦ ⟨...w⟩	⟨...a⟩	⟨...o⟩
⟨o...⟩	⟨oe¦œ⟩ > ⟨e⟩ – /i/	⟨oi¦oy⟩ – /ɔɪ/	⟨ou¦ow⟩ – /aʊ¦uː¦oʊ/	⟨oa⟩ – /oʊ¦ɔː/	⟨oo⟩ – /uː¦ʊ(¦ʌ)/
⟨a...⟩	⟨ae¦æ⟩ > ⟨e⟩ – /i/	⟨ai¦ay⟩ – /eɪ¦ɛ/	⟨au¦aw⟩ – /ɔː/ (in loanwords: /aʊ/ )	(in loanwords and proper nouns: ⟨aa⟩ – /ə¦ɔː¦ɔl/ )	(in loanwords from Chinese: ⟨ao⟩ – /aʊ/ )
⟨e...⟩	⟨ee⟩ – /iː/	⟨ei¦ey⟩ – /aɪ¦eɪ¦(iː)/	⟨eu¦ew⟩ – /juː¦uː/	⟨ea⟩ – /iː¦ɛ¦(eɪ¦ɪə)/	
⟨u...⟩	⟨ue⟩ – /uː¦u/	⟨ui⟩ – /ɪ¦uː/			
⟨i...⟩	⟨ie⟩ – /iː(¦aɪ)/				

==== Other languages using the Latin alphabet ====
In Serbo-Croatian:

- ⟨lj⟩ corresponds to /ʎ/, (palatal lateral approximant)
- ⟨nj⟩ corresponds to /ɲ/ (palatal nasal)
- ⟨dž⟩ corresponds to /d͡ʒ/ (voiced postalveolar affricate)

Note that in the Cyrillic orthography, those sounds are represented by single letters (љ, њ, џ).

In Czech and Slovak:

- ⟨ch⟩ corresponds to /x/ (voiceless velar fricative), counted as a distinct letter
- ⟨dz⟩ corresponds to /d͡z/ (voiced alveolar affricate), counted as a distinct letter in Slovak, relatively rare digraph
- ⟨dž⟩ corresponds to /d͡ʒ/ (voiced postalveolar affricate), counted as a distinct letter in Slovak, relatively rare digraph

In Danish and Norwegian:

- The digraph ⟨aa⟩ represented /ɔ/ until 1917 in Norway and 1948 in Denmark, but is today spelt ⟨å⟩. The digraph is still used in older names, but sorted as if it were the letter with the diacritic mark.

In Norwegian, several sounds can be represented only by a digraph or a combination of letters. They are the most common combinations, but extreme regional differences exists, especially those of the eastern dialects. A noteworthy difference is the aspiration of ⟨rs⟩ in eastern dialects, where it corresponds to ⟨skj⟩ and ⟨sj⟩. Among many young people, especially in the western regions of Norway and in or around the major cities, the difference between /ç/ and /ʃ/ has been completely wiped away and are now pronounced the same.

- ⟨kj⟩ represents /ç/
- ⟨tj⟩ represents /ç/.
- ⟨skj⟩ represents /ʃ/.
- ⟨sj⟩ represents /ʃ/.
- ⟨sk⟩ represents /ʃ/ (before i or y).
- ⟨ng⟩ represents /ŋ/ as in ng in English thing.

In Catalan:

- ⟨ll⟩ represents /ʎ/ (palatal lateral approximant)
- ⟨ny⟩ represents /ɲ/ (palatal nasal)
- ⟨rr⟩ represents /r/ (post-alveolar trill)
- ⟨ss⟩ represents /s/ (voiceless alveolar retracted sibilant)
- ⟨qu⟩ represents /k/ (voiceless velar plosive)
- ⟨gu⟩ represents /g/ (voiced velar plosive)
- postvocalic ⟨ix⟩ represents /ʃ/ (voiceless postalveolar fricative) in Eastern dialects, in Western dialects it represents /jʃ/.

In Dutch:

- ⟨ij⟩ corresponds to /ɛi/ (see above for its possible status as a separate letter).
- ⟨ng⟩ represents /ŋ/ (velar nasal)
- ⟨ch⟩ represents /x/ (voiceless velar fricative)
- ⟨sj⟩ represents /ʃ/ (voiceless postalveolar fricative)
- ⟨ie⟩ represents /i/ (close front unrounded vowel)
- ⟨oe⟩ represents /u/ (close back rounded vowel)
- ⟨eu⟩ represents /ø/ (close-mid front rounded vowel)

In French:

- ⟨ch⟩ represents /ʃ/ (voiceless postalveolar fricative)
- ⟨gn⟩ represents /ɲ/ (palatal nasal)
- ⟨qu⟩ represents /k/ (voiceless velar stop), typically before historic front vowels

French vocalic digraphs
	⟨...i⟩	⟨...u⟩
⟨a...⟩	⟨ai⟩ – /ɛ¦e/	⟨au⟩ – /o/
⟨e...⟩	⟨ei⟩ – /ɛ/	⟨eu⟩ – /œ¦ø/
⟨o...⟩	⟨oi⟩ – /wa/	⟨ou⟩ – /u(¦w)/

See also French phonology.

In German:

- ⟨ch⟩ represents /x/ (voiceless velar fricative) or /ç/ (voiceless palatal fricative)
- ⟨ck⟩ represents /k/ (voiceless velar plosive)
- ⟨ei⟩ and ⟨ai⟩ represent /a͡ɪ/ (open front unrounded vowel) followed by (near-close near-front unrounded vowel)
- ⟨eu⟩ and ⟨äu⟩ represent /ɔ͡ʏ/ (open-mid back rounded vowel) followed by (near-close near-front rounded vowel)

In Hungarian:

- ⟨cs⟩ represents /tʃ/ (voiceless postalveolar affricate)
- ⟨zs⟩ represents /ʒ/ (voiced postalveolar fricative)
- ⟨gy⟩ represents /ɟ/ (voiced palatal plosive)
- ⟨ly⟩ originally represented /ʎ/ (palatal lateral approximant), but in the modern language stands for /j/ (palatal approximant)
- ⟨ny⟩ represents /ɲ/ (palatal nasal)
- ⟨ty⟩ represents /c/ (voiceless palatal plosive)
- ⟨dz⟩ represents /dz/ (voiced postalveolar affricate)
- ⟨sz⟩ represents /s/ (voiceless alveolar fricative) (⟨s⟩ is pronounced /ʃ/)
- The Hungarian alphabet additionally contains also a trigraph, ⟨dzs⟩ /dʒ/.

In Italian:

- ⟨sc⟩ corresponds to /ʃ/, (voiceless postalveolar fricative) before -i and -e (but to /sk/ before other letters)
- ⟨ch⟩ corresponds to /k/ (only before i, e)
- ⟨gh⟩ corresponds to /ɡ/ (only before i, e)
- ⟨gl⟩ represents /ʎ/, palatal lateral approximant, before -i (with some exceptions)
- ⟨gn⟩ represents /ɲ/ (palatal nasal)

In Manx Gaelic, ⟨ch⟩ represents /χ/, but ⟨çh⟩ represents /tʃ/.

In Polish:

- ⟨ch⟩ corresponds to /x/ (voiceless velar fricative)
- ⟨cz⟩ corresponds to /tʂ/ (voiceless retroflex affricate)
- ⟨dz⟩ corresponds to /dz/ (voiced alveolar affricate)
- ⟨dź⟩ corresponds to /dʑ/ (voiced alveolo-palatal affricate)
- ⟨dż⟩ corresponds to /dʐ/ (voiced retroflex affricate)
- ⟨rz⟩ corresponds to /ʐ/ (voiced retroflex fricative)
- ⟨sz⟩ corresponds to /ʂ/ (voiceless retroflex fricative)

In Portuguese:

- ⟨ch⟩ corresponds to /ʃ/ (voiceless postalveolar fricative)
- ⟨lh⟩ corresponds to /ʎ/ (palatal lateral approximant)
- ⟨nh⟩ corresponds to /ɲ/ (palatal nasal)
- ⟨qu⟩ usually represents /k/ (voiceless velar stop), when prefixed by letters ⟨e⟩ and ⟨i⟩, but with exceptions.

In Spanish:

- ⟨ll⟩ is traditionally pronounced /ʎ/, but in dialects with yeísmo is pronounced /ʝ/
- ⟨ch⟩ represents /tʃ/ (voiceless postalveolar affricate). Since 2010, neither is considered part of the alphabet. They used to be sorted as separate letters, but a reform in 1994 by the Spanish Royal Academy has allowed that they be split into their constituent letters for collation. The digraph ⟨rr⟩, pronounced as a distinct alveolar trill, was never officially considered to be a letter in the Spanish alphabet, and the same is true ⟨gu⟩ and ⟨qu⟩ (for /ɡ/ and /k/ respectively before ⟨e⟩ or ⟨i⟩).

In Welsh:

- ⟨ng⟩ represents /ŋ/ (velar nasal), the same sound as in English (but in some words it represents two separate letters, and is pronounced /ng/).
- ⟨ch⟩ represents /χ/ (voiceless uvular fricative)
- ⟨rh⟩ represents /r̥/ (voiceless alveolar trill), pronounced roughly like the combination hr (but again in some words it represents two separate letters, and is pronounced /rh/).
- ⟨th⟩ represents /θ/ (voiceless interdental fricative)
- ⟨dd⟩ represents /ð/ (voiced dental fricative), like the English ⟨th⟩ in then (but is pronounced as voiceless in many contexts).
- ⟨ff⟩ represents /f/ (voiceless labiodental fricative), like English ⟨f⟩, since Welsh ⟨f⟩ is pronounced /v/ like an English ⟨v⟩.
- ⟨ph⟩ also represents /f/ (voiceless labiodental fricative) but, in modern orthography, is used only for the aspirate mutation of words starting with ⟨p⟩.
- ⟨ll⟩ represents /ɬ/ (voiceless alveolar lateral fricative)

The digraphs listed above represent distinct phonemes and are treated as separate letters for collation purposes. On the other hand, the digraphs ⟨mh⟩, ⟨nh⟩, and the trigraph ⟨ngh⟩, which stand for voiceless consonants but occur only at the beginning of words as a result of the nasal mutation, are not treated as separate letters, and thus are not included in the alphabet.

Daighi tongiong pingim, a transcription system used for Taiwanese Hokkien, includes or that represents /ə/ (mid central vowel) or /o/ (close-mid back rounded vowel), as well as other digraphs.

In Yoruba, ⟨gb⟩ is a letter that represents a plosive most accurately pronounced by trying to say /g/ and /b/ at the same time.

=== Cyrillic ===
Modern Slavic languages written in the Cyrillic alphabet make little use of digraphs apart from ⟨дж⟩ for /dʐ/, ⟨дз⟩ for /dz/ (in Ukrainian, Belarusian, and Bulgarian), and ⟨жж⟩ and ⟨зж⟩ for the uncommon Russian phoneme /ʑː/. In Russian, the sequences ⟨дж⟩ and ⟨дз⟩ do occur (mainly in loanwords) but are pronounced as combinations of an implosive (sometimes treated as an affricate) and a fricative; implosives are treated as allophones of the plosive /d̪/ and so those sequences are not considered to be digraphs. Cyrillic has few digraphs unless it is used to write non-Slavic languages, especially Caucasian languages.

=== Arabic script ===
Because vowels are not generally written, digraphs are rare in abjads like Arabic. For example, if sh were used for š, then the sequence sh could mean either ša or saha. However, digraphs are used for the aspirated and murmured consonants (those spelled with h-digraphs in Latin transcription) in languages of South Asia such as Urdu that are written in the Arabic script by a special form of the letter h, which is used only for aspiration digraphs, as can be seen with the following connecting (kh) and non-connecting (ḍh) consonants:

Urdu	connecting		non-connecting
digraph:	کھا	/kʰɑː/	ڈھا	/ɖʱɑː/
sequence:	کہا	/kəɦɑː/	ڈہا	/ɖəɦɑː/

=== Armenian ===
In the Armenian language, the digraph ու ⟨ou⟩ transcribes /u/, a convention that comes from Greek.

=== Georgian ===
The Georgian alphabet uses a few digraphs to write other languages. For example, in Svan, /ø/ is written ჳე ⟨we⟩, and /y/ as ჳი ⟨wi⟩.

=== Greek ===
Modern Greek has the following digraphs:

- αι (ai) represents /e̞/
- ει (ei) represents /i/
- οι (oi) represents /i/
- ου (oy) represents /u/
- υι (yi) represents /i/

They are called "diphthongs" in Greek; in classical times, most of them represented diphthongs, and the name has stuck.

- γγ (gg) represents /ŋɡ/ or /ɡ/
- τσ (ts) represents the affricate /ts/
- τζ (tz) represents the affricate /dz/
- Initial γκ (gk) represents /ɡ/
- Initial μπ (mp) represents /b/
- Initial ντ (nt) represents /d/

Ancient Greek also had the "diphthongs" listed above although their pronunciation in ancient times is disputed. In addition, Ancient Greek also used the letter γ combined with a velar stop to produce the following digraphs:

- γγ (gg) represents /ŋɡ/
- γκ (gk) represents /ŋɡ/
- γχ (gkh) represents /ŋkʰ/

Tsakonian has a few additional digraphs:

- ρζ (rz) /ʒ/ (historically perhaps a fricative trill)
- κχ (kkh) represents /kʰ/
- τθ (tth) represents /tʰ/
- πφ (pph) represents /pʰ/
- σχ (skh) represents /ʃ/

In addition, palatal consonants are indicated with the vowel letter ι, which is, however, largely predictable. When /n/ and /l/ are not palatalized before ι, they are written νν and λλ.

In Bactrian, the digraphs ββ, δδ, and γγ were used for /b/, /d/, and /ŋg/ respectively.

=== Hebrew ===
In the Hebrew alphabet, תס and תש may sometimes be found for צ /ts/, with תש also being used for /tʃ/ (as in the word תשובה answer). Modern Hebrew also uses digraphs made with the ׳ symbol for non-native sounds: ג׳ /dʒ/, ז׳ /ʒ/, צ׳ /tʃ/; and other digraphs of letters when it is written without vowels: וו for a consonantal letter ו in the middle of a word, and יי for /aj/ or /aji/, etc., that is, a consonantal letter י in places where it might not have been expected. Yiddish has its own tradition of transcription and so uses different digraphs for some of the same sounds: דז /dz/, זש /ʒ/, טש /tʃ/, and דזש (literally dzš) for /dʒ/, וו /v/, also available as a single Unicode character װ, וי or as a single character in Unicode ױ /oj/, יי or ײ /ej/, and ײַ /aj/. The single-character digraphs are called "ligatures" in Unicode. י may also be used following a consonant to indicate palatalization in Slavic loanwords.

=== Indic ===
Most Indic scripts have compound vowel diacritics that cannot be predicted from their individual elements. That can be illustrated with Thai in which the diacritic เ, pronounced alone /eː/, modifies the pronunciation of other vowels:

single vowel sign:	กา	/kaː/,	เก	/keː/,	กอ	/kɔː/
vowel sign plus เ:	เกา	/kaw/,	แก	/kɛː/,	เกอ	/kɤː/

In addition, the combination รร is pronounced /a/ or /an/, there are some words in which the combinations ทร and ศร stand for /s/ and the letter ห, as a prefix to a consonant, changes its tonic class to high, modifying the tone of the syllable.

=== Inuit ===
Inuktitut syllabics adds two digraphs to Cree:

rk for q
ᙯ qai, ᕿ qi, ᖁ qu, ᖃ qa, ᖅ q

and

ng for ŋ
ᖕ ng

The latter forms trigraphs and tetragraphs.

=== CJK Characters ===
==== Chinese ====
Several combinations of Chinese characters (Hanzi) formed from two or more different characters that are known as digraphs.

==== Japanese ====
Two kana may be combined into a CV syllable by subscripting the second; the convention cancels the vowel of the first. That is commonly done for CyV syllables called yōon, as in ひょ (ひ_{よ}) hyo ⟨hi_{yo}⟩. They are not digraphs since they retain the normal sequential reading of the two glyphs. However, some obsolete sequences no longer retain that reading, as in くゎ kwa, ぐゎ gwa, and むゎ mwa, now pronounced ka, ga, ma. In addition, non-sequenceable digraphs are used for foreign loans that do not follow normal Japanese assibilation patterns, such as ティ ti, トゥ tu, チェ tye / che, スェ swe, ウィ wi, ツォ tso, ズィ zi. (See katakana and transcription into Japanese for complete tables.)

Long vowels are written by adding the kana for that vowel, in effect doubling it. However, long ō may be written either oo or ou, as in とうきょう toukyou [toːkʲoː] 'Tōkyō'. For dialects that do not distinguish ē and ei, the latter spelling is used for a long e, as in へいせい heisei [heːseː] 'Heisei'. In loanwords, chōonpu, a line following the direction of the text, as in ビール bīru [biːru] bīru 'beer'. With the exception of syllables starting with n, doubled consonant sounds are written by prefixing a smaller version of tsu (written っ and ッ in hiragana and katakana respectively), as in きって kitte 'stamp'. Consonants beginning with n use the kana n character (written ん or ン) as a prefix instead.

There are several conventions of Okinawan kana that involve subscript digraphs or ligatures. For instance, in the University of the Ryukyu's system, ウ is /ʔu/, ヲ is /o/, but ヲゥ (ヲ_{ウ}) is /u/.

==== Korean ====
As was the case in Greek, Korean has vowels descended from diphthongs that are still written with two letters. Those digraphs, ㅐ /ɛ/ and ㅔ /e/ (also ㅒ /jɛ/, ㅖ /je/), and in some dialects ㅚ /ø/ and ㅟ /y/, all end in historical ㅣ /i/.

Hangul was designed with a digraph series to represent the "muddy" consonants: ㅃ *[b], ㄸ *[d], ㅉ *[dz], ㄲ *[ɡ], ㅆ *[z], ㆅ *[ɣ]; also ᅇ, with an uncertain value. Those values are now obsolete, but most of the doubled letters were resurrected in the 19th century to write consonants that did not exist when hangul was devised: ㅃ /p͈/, ㄸ /t͈/, ㅉ /t͈ɕ/, ㄲ /k͈/, ㅆ /s͈/.

== Ligatures and new letters ==
Digraphs sometimes come to be written as a ligature. Over time, the ligatures may evolve into new letters or letters with diacritics. For example sz became ß in German, and "nn" became ñ in Spanish.

== In Unicode ==
Generally, a digraph is simply represented using two characters in Unicode. However, for various reasons, Unicode sometimes provides a separate code point for a digraph, encoded as a single character.

The DZ and IJ digraphs and the Serbian/Croatian digraphs DŽ, LJ, and NJ have separate code points in Unicode.

Two Glyphs	Digraph	Unicode Code Point	HTML
DZ, Dz, dz	Ǳ, ǲ, ǳ	U+01F1 U+01F2 U+01F3	&#x1F1; &#x1F2; &#x1F3;
DŽ, Dž, dž	Ǆ, ǅ, ǆ	U+01C4 U+01C5 U+01C6	&#x1C4; &#x1C5; &#x1C6;
IJ, ij	Ĳ, ĳ	U+0132 U+0133	&#x132; &#x133;
LJ, Lj, lj	Ǉ, ǈ, ǉ	U+01C7 U+01C8 U+01C9	&#x1C7; &#x1C8; &#x1C9;
NJ, Nj, nj	Ǌ, ǋ, ǌ	U+01CA U+01CB U+01CC	&#x1CA; &#x1CB; &#x1CC;
th	ᵺ	U+1D7A	

See also Ligatures in Unicode.

== See also ==
- Multigraph (orthography)
- Trigraph
- Tetragraph
- Pentagraph
- Hexagraph
- Bigram
- Diphthong
- List of Latin letters
- Digraph (programming)
