= Z =

Twenty-sixth letter of the Latin alphabet

- Z z

Usage
- Writing system: Latin script
- Type: Alphabetic and logographic
- Language of origin: Latin language
- Sound values: [z]; [d͡z]; [t͡s]; [d͡ʒ]; [ð]; [θ]; [s]; [ʃ]; [j]; [ʒ]
- In Unicode: U+005A, U+007A
- Alphabetical position: 26

History
Development
Z4
        - Ζ ζ
          - 𐌆
            - Z z
- Time period: c. 700 BCE to present
- Descendants: Ʒ; Ç; Ƶ; Ž; Ż; 𐌶; ℤ; Ꮓ
- Sisters: З; Ѕ; Ԑ; Ԇ; Ҙ; ꙅ; Ӡ; ז ز ܙ; ژ; ࠆ; ዘ; 𐎇; Զ զ; Ꮓ; Ꮛ; Ꮸ; ડ; ઢ; ज़; Disputed: ㄷ

Other
- Associated graphs: z(x), cz, dž, dz, sz, dzs, tzsch
- Writing direction: Left-to-right

Z (minuscule: z) is the twenty-sixth and last letter of the Latin alphabet. It is used in the modern English alphabet, in the alphabets of other Western European languages, and in others worldwide. Its usual names in English are zed (/ˈzɛd/), which is most commonly used in British English, and zee (/ˈziː/), most commonly used in American English, (Note: Canada and some Caribbean countries use zee along with zed, with the latter being preferred in written English.) with an occasional archaic variant izzard (/ˈɪzərd/).

== Name ==
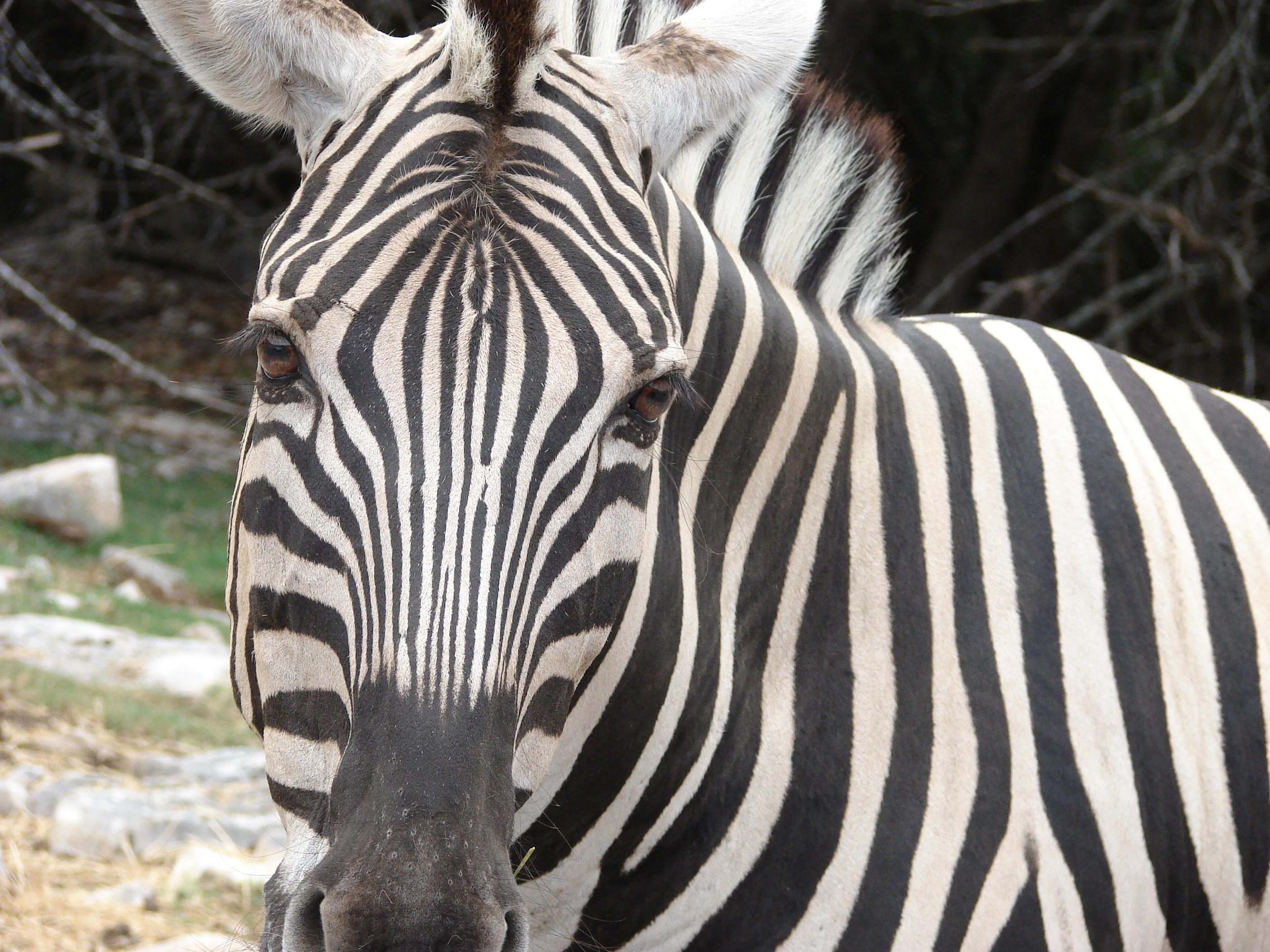
The zebra is sometimes used as a memorization aid in English education.

In most English-speaking countries, including Australia, Canada, India, Ireland, New Zealand, South Africa and the United Kingdom, the letter's name is zed /zɛd/, reflecting its derivation from the Greek letter zeta (this dates to Latin, which borrowed Y and Z from Greek), but in American English its name is zee /ziː/, analogous to the names for B, C, D, etc., and deriving from a late 17th-century English dialectal form.

Another English dialectal form is izzard /ˈɪzərd/. This dates from the mid-18th century and probably derives from Occitan izèda or the French ézed, whose reconstructed Latin form would be *idzēta, perhaps a Vulgar Latin form with a prosthetic vowel. Outside of the anglosphere, its variants are still used in Hong Kong English and Cantonese.

Other languages spell the letter's name in a similar way: zeta in Italian, Basque, and Spanish, seta in Icelandic (dropped from its alphabet in 1974 but found in personal names), zê in Portuguese, zäta in Swedish, zæt in Danish, zet in Dutch, Indonesian, Polish, Romanian, and Czech, Zett in German (capitalized as a noun), zett in Norwegian, zède in French, zetto (ゼット) in Japanese, and giét in Vietnamese (not part of its alphabet). Several languages render it as /ts/ or /dz/, e.g. tseta /ˈtsetɑ/ or more rarely tset /tset/ in Finnish (sometimes dropping the first t altogether; /ˈsetɑ/, or /set/ the latter of which is not very commonplace). In Standard Chinese pinyin, the name of the letter Z is pronounced [tsɨ], as in "zi", although the English zed and zee have become very common. In Esperanto the name of the letter Z is pronounced /zo/.

== History ==
Phoenician Zayin	Western Greek Zeta	Etruscan Z	Latin Z

=== Semitic ===
The Semitic symbol was the seventh letter, named zayin, which meant "weapon" or "sword". It represented either the sound /z/ as in English and French, or possibly more like /dz/ (as in Italian zeta, zero).

=== Greek ===
The Greek form of Z was a close copy of the Phoenician Zayin, and the Greek inscriptional form remained in this shape throughout ancient times. The Greeks called it zeta, a new name made in imitation of eta (η) and theta (θ).

In earlier Greek of Athens and Northwest Greece, the letter seems to have represented /dz/; in Attic, from the 4th century BC onwards, it seems to have stood for /zd/ and /dz/ – there is no consensus concerning this issue. In other dialects, such as Elean and Cretan, the symbol seems to have been used for sounds resembling the English voiced and voiceless th (IPA /ð/ and /θ/, respectively). In the common dialect (koine) that succeeded the older dialects, ζ became /z/, as it remains in modern Greek.

=== Etruscan ===
The Etruscan letter Z was derived from the Phoenician alphabet, most probably through the Greek alphabet used on the island of Ischia. In Etruscan, this letter may have represented /ts/.

=== Latin ===
The letter Z existed in more archaic versions of Latin, but at c. 300 BC, Appius Claudius Caecus, the Roman censor, removed the letter Z from the alphabet, because the appearance while pronouncing it imitated a grinning skull. A more likely explanation is that the /z/ sound that it represented had disappeared from Latin after turning into /r/ due to a rhotacism process, making the letter useless for spelling Latin words. Whatever the case may be, Appius Claudius's distaste for the letter Z is today credited as the reason for its removal. A few centuries later, after the Roman Conquest of Greece, Z was again borrowed to spell words from the prestigious Attic dialect of Greek.

Before the reintroduction of z, the sound of zeta was written s at the beginning of words and ss in the middle of words, as in sōna for ζώνη "belt" and trapessita for τραπεζίτης "banker".

In some inscriptions, z represented a Vulgar Latin sound, likely an affricate, formed by the merging of the reflexes of Classical Latin /j/, /dj/ and /gj/: for example, zanuariu for ianuariu "January", ziaconus for diaconus "deacon", and oze for hodie "today". Likewise, /di/ sometimes replaced /z/ in words like baptidiare for baptizare "to baptize". In modern Italian, z represents /ts/ or /dz/, whereas the reflexes of ianuarius and hodie are written with the letter g (representing /dʒ/ when before i and e): gennaio, oggi. In other languages, such as Spanish, further evolution of the sound occurred.

=== Old English ===
Old English used S alone for both the unvoiced and the voiced sibilant. The Latin sound imported through French was new and was not written with Z but with G or I. The successive changes can be seen in the doublet forms jealous and zealous. Both of these come from a late Latin zelosus, derived from the imported Greek ζῆλος zêlos. The earlier form is jealous; its initial sound is the [dʒ], which developed to Modern French [ʒ]. John Wycliffe wrote the word as gelows or ielous.

Z at the end of a word was pronounced ts, as in English assets, from Old French asez "enough" (Modern French assez), from Vulgar Latin ad satis ("to sufficiency").

=== Last letter of the alphabet ===
In earlier times, the English alphabets used by children terminated not with Z but with & or related typographic symbols.

Some Latin based alphabets have extra letters on the end of the alphabet. The last letter for the Icelandic, Finnish and Swedish alphabets is Ö, while it is Å for Danish and Norwegian. The German alphabet ends with Z, as the umlauts (Ä/ä, Ö/ö, and Ü/ü) and the letter ß (Eszett or scharfes S) are regarded respectively as modifications of the vowels a/o/u and as a (standardized) variant spelling of ss, not as independent letters, so they come after the unmodified letters in the alphabetical order.

=== Typographic variants ===
The variant with a stroke ⟨Ƶƶ⟩ and tailed Z ⟨Ʒʒ⟩, though distinct characters, can also be considered to be allographs of ⟨Zz⟩.

Tailed Z (German geschwänztes Z, also Z mit Unterschlinge) originated in the medieval Gothic minuscules and the Early Modern Blackletter typefaces. In some Antiqua typefaces, this letter is present as a standalone letter or in ligatures. Ligated with long s (ſ), it is part of the origin of the Eszett (ß) in the German alphabet. The character came to be indistinguishable from the yogh (ȝ) in Middle English writing, leading to the apparently anomalous pronunciation of the surname Menzies.

Unicode assigns codepoints U+2128 ℨ BLACK-LETTER CAPITAL Z (&zeetrf;, &Zfr;) and U+1D537 𝔷 MATHEMATICAL FRAKTUR SMALL Z (&zfr;) in the Letterlike Symbols and Mathematical alphanumeric symbols ranges respectively.

lowercase cursive z

tailed z in a sans-serif typeface

== Use in writing systems ==
Pronunciation of ⟨z⟩ by language
Orthography	Phonemes
Basque	/s̻/
Cantonese (Jyutping)	/ts/
Catalan	/z/, /s/
Standard Chinese (Pinyin)	/ts/
Czech	/z/
Dutch	/z/
Finnish	/ts/
French	/z/ (often /s/ or silent, but /ts/ in loanwords from German and /dz/ in loanwords from Italian)
German	/ts/
Galician	/θ/, /s/
Hungarian	/z/
Icelandic	/s/
Inari Sámi	/dz/
Indonesian	/z/
Italian	/dz/, /ts/
Japanese (Hepburn)	/z/~/dz/
Northern Sami	/dz/
Polish	/z/
Portuguese	/z/, /s/~/ʃ/
Scots	/z/, /g/, /j/
Spanish	/θ/, /s/
Turkish	/z/
Turkmen	/ð/
Venetian	/z/, /dz/, /ð/, /d/

=== English ===
In modern English orthography, the letter ⟨z⟩ usually represents the sound /z/.

It represents /ʒ/ in words like seizure. More often, this sound appears as ⟨su⟩ or ⟨si⟩ in words such as measure, decision, etc. In all these words, /ʒ/ developed from earlier /zj/ by yod-coalescence.

Few words in the Basic English vocabulary begin or end with ⟨z⟩, though it occurs within other words. It is the least frequently used letter in written English, with a frequency of about 0.08% in words. ⟨z⟩ is more common in the Oxford spelling of British English than in standard British English, as this variant prefers the more etymologically 'correct' -ize endings, which are closer to Greek, to -ise endings, which are closer to French; however, -yse is preferred over -yze in Oxford spelling, as it is closer to the original Greek roots of words like analyse. The most common variety of English it is used in is American English, which prefers both the -ize and -yze endings. One native Germanic English word that contains 'z', freeze (past froze, participle frozen) came to be spelled that way by convention, even though it could have been spelled with 's' (as with choose, chose and chosen).

⟨z⟩ is used in writing to represent the act of sleeping (often using multiple z's, like zzzz), as an onomatopoeia for the sound of closed-mouth human snoring.

=== Other languages ===
⟨z⟩ stands for a voiced alveolar or voiced dental sibilant /z/, in Albanian, Breton, Czech, Dutch, French, Hungarian, Latvian, Lithuanian, Romanian, Serbo-Croatian, and Slovak. It stands for /t͡s/ in Chinese pinyin and Jyutping, Finnish (occurs in loanwords only), and German, and is likewise expressed /ts/ in Old Norse. In Italian, it represents two phonemes, /t͡s/ and /d͡z/. In Portuguese, it stands for /z/ in most cases, but also for /s/ or /ʃ/ (depending on the regional variant) at the end of syllables. In Basque, it represents the sound /s/.

Castilian Spanish uses the letter to represent /θ/ (as English ⟨th⟩ in thing), though in other dialects (Latin American, Andalusian) this sound has merged with /s/. Before voiced consonants, the sound is voiced to [ð] or [z], sometimes debbucalized to [ɦ] (as in the surname Guzmán [ɡuðˈman], [ɡuzˈman] or [ɡuɦˈman]). This is the only context in which ⟨z⟩ can represent a voiced sibilant [z] in Spanish, though ⟨s⟩ also represents [z] (or [ɦ], depending on the dialect) in this environment.

In Danish, Norwegian, and Swedish, ⟨z⟩ usually stands for the sound /s/ and thus shares the value of ⟨s⟩; it normally occurs only in loanwords that are spelt with ⟨z⟩ in the source languages.

The letter ⟨z⟩ on its own represents /z/ in Polish. It is also used in four of the seven officially recognized digraphs: ⟨cz⟩ (/t͡ʂ/), ⟨dz⟩ (/d͡z/), ⟨rz⟩ (/ʐ/ or /ʂ/) and ⟨sz⟩ (/ʂ/), and is one of the most frequently used of the consonant letters in that language. (Other Slavic languages avoid digraphs and mark the corresponding phonemes with the háček (caron) diacritic: ⟨č⟩, ⟨ď⟩, ⟨ř⟩, ⟨š⟩; this system has its origin in Czech orthography of the Hussite period.) ⟨z⟩ can also appear with diacritical marks, namely ⟨ź⟩ and ⟨ż⟩, which are used to represent the sounds /ʑ/ and /ʐ/. They also appear in the digraphs ⟨dź⟩ (/d͡ʑ/) and ⟨dż⟩ (/d͡ʐ/).

Hungarian uses ⟨z⟩ in the digraphs ⟨sz⟩ (expressing /s/, as opposed to the value of ⟨s⟩, which is ʃ), and ⟨zs⟩ (expressing ʒ). The letter ⟨z⟩ on its own represents /z/.

In Modern Scots, ⟨z⟩ usually represents /z/, but is also used in place of the obsolete letter ⟨ȝ⟩ (yogh), which represents /g/ and /j/. Whilst there are a few common nouns which use ⟨z⟩ in this manner, such as brulzie (pronounced 'brulgey' meaning broil), ⟨z⟩ as a yogh substitute is more common in people's names and placenames. Often the names are pronounced to follow the apparent English spelling, so Mackenzie is commonly pronounced with /z/. Menzies, however, retains the pronunciation of 'Mingus'.

Among non-European languages that have adopted the Latin alphabet, ⟨z⟩ usually stands for [z], such as in Azerbaijani, Igbo, Indonesian, Shona, Swahili, Tatar, Turkish, and Zulu. ⟨z⟩ represents [d͡z] in Northern Sami and Inari Sami. In Turkmen, ⟨z⟩ represents [ð].

In the Nihon-shiki, Kunrei-shiki, and Hepburn romanisations of Japanese, ⟨z⟩ stands for a phoneme whose allophones include [z] and [dz] (see Yotsugana). Additionally, in the Nihon-shiki and Kunrei-shiki systems, ⟨z⟩ is used to represent that same phoneme before /i/, where it's pronounced [d͡ʑ ~ ʑ].

In the Jyutping romanization of Cantonese, ⟨z⟩ represents /ts/. Other romanizations use either ⟨j⟩, ⟨ch⟩, or ⟨ts⟩.

=== Other systems ===
In the International Phonetic Alphabet, ⟨z⟩ represents the voiced alveolar sibilant. The graphical variant ⟨ʒ⟩ was adopted as the sign for the voiced postalveolar fricative.

== Other uses ==
- In mathematics, U+2124 ℤ DOUBLE-STRUCK CAPITAL Z is used to denote the set of integers. Originally, $\mathbb{Z}$ was just a handwritten version of the bold capital Z used in printing but, over time, it has come to be used more frequently in printed works too. The variable z is also commonly used to represent a complex number.
- In geometry, z is used to denote the third axis in Cartesian coordinates when representing 3-dimensional space.
- In chemistry, the letter Z is used to denote the atomic number of an element (number of protons), such as Z=3 for lithium.
- In electrical engineering, Z is used to denote electrical impedance.
- In astronomy, z is a dimensionless quantity representing redshift.
- In nuclear physics, Z denotes the atomic number and Z^{0} denotes a Z boson.
- In computer programming, Z is the abbreviation for the zero flag.
- In Japan, the Z flag is a symbol in the national myth, representing the Battle of Tsushima.
- Z has been used by the Russian Armed Forces as an identifying symbol on its military vehicles, during the Russo-Ukrainian war. Russian civilians have used the symbol to express support for the invasion.

== Related characters ==
=== Descendants and related characters in the Latin alphabet ===
- Z with diacritics: Ź ź Ẑ ẑ Ž ž Ż ż Ẓ ẓ Ẕ ẕ Ƶ ƶ ᵶ Ᶎ ᶎ Ⱬ ⱬ
- ß : German letter regarded as a ligature of long s (ſ) and short s, called scharfes S or Eszett. (In some typefaces and handwriting styles, it is rather a ligature of long s and tailed z (ſʒ).)
- Ȥ ȥ: Latin letter z with a hook, intended for the transcription of Middle High German, for instances of the letter z with a sound value of /s/.
- Ɀ ɀ : Latin letter Z with swash tail
- Ʒ ʒ : Latin letter ezh
- Ꝣ ꝣ : Visigothic Z
- Ᶎ ᶎ : Z with hook, used for writing Mandarin Chinese using the early draft version of pinyin romanization during the mid-1950s
- International Phonetic Alphabet-specific symbols related to Z: ʒ ʑ ʐ ɮ
- U+1D22 ᴢ LATIN LETTER SMALL CAPITAL Z is used in the Uralic Phonetic Alphabet
- U+1DF66 𝽦 LATIN SMALL LETTER REVERSED Z was used in the 1960s and 1970s for the Initial Teaching Alphabet
- Modifier letters ᶻ ᶼ ᶽ are used in phonetic transcription

=== Ancestors and siblings in other alphabets ===
- 𐤆 : Semitic letter Zayin, from which the following letters derive:
  - Ζ ζ : Greek letter Zeta, from which the following letters derive:
    - Ⲍ ⲍ : Coptic letter Zēta
    - 𐌆 : Old Italic Z, which is the ancestor of modern Latin Z
    - 𐌶 : Gothic letter ezec
    - З з : Cyrillic letter Ze

== Other representations ==
=== Unicode ===
- U+005A Z LATIN CAPITAL LETTER Z
- U+007A z LATIN SMALL LETTER Z

=== Other ===
NATO phonetic	Morse code
Zulu	▄▄▄ ▄▄▄ ▄ ▄

Signal flag

Flag semaphore
American manual alphabet (ASL fingerspelling)
British manual alphabet (BSL fingerspelling)
Braille dots-1356
Unified English Braille

== See also ==
- Bourbaki dangerous bend symbol, U+2621 ☡ CAUTION SIGN
