= Hungarian ly =

Letter of the Hungarian alphabet

Ly is a digraph of the Latin alphabet, used in Hungarian.

== Usage ==
Ly is the twentieth letter of the Hungarian alphabet. Its Hungarian name is elipszilon /ɛlːipsilon/. Now, it can represent the same phoneme /j/ (palatal approximant) as the Hungarian letter j, but historically, it represented a different phoneme /ʎ/ (palatal lateral approximant).

It is used this way only in Hungarian. In Hungarian, even if two characters are put together to make a different sound, they are considered one letter, and even acronyms keep the letter intact.

The combination lj (considered two separate letters, L and J) is also common in Hungarian and is even pronounced [ʎ] by many speakers. However, even it is sometimes subject to the same reduction to /j/ that ly has been, mainly if it is at the end of a word.

== History ==
Originally, the digraph letter ly was used to represent the palatal lateral /ʎ/, just as the digraph letter ny is still used to represent the palatal nasal /ɲ/. However, in the eastern dialects as well as in the standard dialect, the phoneme /ʎ/ lost its lateral feature and merged with /j/ (akin to Spanish yeísmo). The Hungarian letter ly came to be pronounced the same as the Hungarian letter j. In the western dialects, /ʎ/ lost its palatal feature and merged with /l/ (alveolar lateral approximant). In the northern dialects, the phoneme /ʎ/ has been preserved.

The digraph ly was also used for the sound /ʎ/ in Croatian alphabet before Gaj's Latin Alphabet was introduced.

== Examples ==
These examples are Hungarian words that use the letter ly, with the English translation following:

- furulya = flute
- amely = which
- helyi = local
- golyó = ball
- lyuk = hole
- kehely = goblet
- folyó = river
