= Sz (digraph) =

Digraph of the Latin script

Sz digraph

Sz is a digraph of the Latin script, used in Hungarian, Kashubian and Polish. It is also used to represent syllables in various romanizations of Mandarin and the Hong Kong government romanization of Cantonese.

== Hungarian ==
Sz is the thirty-second letter of the Hungarian alphabet. It represents /s/ and is called "esz" /ɛs/. Thus, names like Liszt are pronounced /list/ list.

In Hungarian, even if two characters are put together to make a different sound, they are considered one letter (a true digraph), and even acronym keep the letter intact.

Hungarian usage of s and sz is almost the reverse of the Polish usage. In Hungarian, s represents /ʃ/. For example, the Hungarian capital of Budapest is natively pronounced (/ˈbudɒpɛʃt/).

There is also a zs in Hungarian, which is the last (forty-fourth) letter of the alphabet, following z.

=== Examples ===
These examples are Hungarian words that use the letter sz, with the English translation following:

- szabó = tailor
- szép = beautiful
- szikla = rock
- szőke = blonde
- szülő = parent
- szusi = sushi
- Olaszország = Italy
- Szudán = Sudan

== Kashubian ==
In Kashubian, sz represents a voiceless postalveolar fricative /ʃ/, identical to the English "sh". It corresponds to the voiceless retroflex fricative /ʂ/ in Polish.

=== Examples ===
These examples are Kashubian words that use the letter sz, with the English translation following.

- szãtopiérz = bat (animal)
- szczawa = sorrel
- szczãka = jaw
- szczëka = pike (fish type)
- szerszéń = hornet

== Polish ==
In Polish orthography, sz represents a voiceless retroflex fricative /ʂ/. It usually corresponds to š or ш in other Slavic languages. It is usually approximated by English speakers with the "sh" (IPA: /ʃ/) sound (and conversely, Polish speakers typically approximate the English digraph sh with the "sz" sound), although the two sounds are not completely identical.

Like other Polish digraphs, it is not considered a single letter for collation purposes.

sz should not be confused with ś (or s followed by i), termed "soft sh", a voiceless alveolo-palatal fricative /ɕ/.

=== Examples ===
obszar (area, territory)
płaszcz (coat, cloak)
Tomasz (Thomas)

Compare ś:
świeca (candle)
iść (to go)
sierpień (August)

== Standard Mandarin ==
In Chinese, both the Yale romanization of Mandarin and Mandarin Phonetic Symbols II use the digraph sz to represent the syllable /sɨ/ (pinyin: si; Wade–Giles: ssŭ).

== Cantonese ==
In the unpublished romanisation scheme employed by the Hong Kong government, sz is sometimes used in combination with e to represent the syllable /siː/, as in Sheung Sze Wan /sœːŋ˥.siː˥.waːn˥/ (Sēung Sī Wāan in Yale romanization).

Sz also appears in the sequence tsz, representing the syllables /t͡siː/ and /t͡sʰiː/, as in Tsz Tin Tsuen /t͡siː˧˥.tʰiːn˨˩.t͡sʰyːn˥/ and Tsz Wan Shan /t͡sʰiː˨˩.wɐn˨˩.saːn˥/ (Jí Tìhn Chyūn and Chìh Wàhn Sāan respectively in Yale romanization).

== See also ==
- Hungarian alphabet
- Polish alphabet
