= Dzs =

Trigraph of the Hungarian alphabet

Dzs is the eighth letter, and the only trigraph, of the Hungarian alphabet. Its name is pronounced [dʒeː], and represents the sounds [d͡ʒ] and [dː͡ʒ], like in English jump.

== History ==
Dz and dzs were recognized as individual letters in the 11th edition of Hungarian orthography (1984). Prior to that, they were analyzed as two-letter combinations d+z and d+zs.

Dzs, along with Dz, are rather uncommon letters or sequences mostly used for terms of foreign origin.

== Length ==
In several words, it is pronounced long, e.g.

- menedzser, bridzs, bridzsel, maharadzsa, lodzsa, rádzsa, hodzsa, dodzsem, tádzsik, Tádzsikisztán, Kudzsiri-havasok (meaning "manager, bridge [game], to play bridge, maharaja, loggia, rajah, hodja, bumper cars (dodgem), Tajik, Tajikistan, Sebeş or Şureanu Mountains", respectively)

in other ones, short, e.g.

- tinédzser, büdzsé, Fudzsi (meaning "teenager, budget, Mount Fuji", respectively)

It is short without exception:

- next to another consonant: lándzsa (meaning "lance (Italian: lancia), findzsa, nindzsa, bendzsó, bandzsa, halandzsa, halandzsázik, mandzsetta, Kilimandzsáró, Azerbajdzsán, Mandzsúria, cup (Turkish: fincan), ninja, banjo, cross-eyed, gibberish, [talks] gibberish, cufflink (German: Manschette), Kilimanjaro, Azerbaijan, Manchuria", respectively)
- and at the beginning of the word: dzsóker, dzsungel, dzsem, dzsip, dzsida, dzsihád, dzsigg, dzsigoló, dzseki, dzsentri, dzsámi, dzsembori, dzsessz, dzsinn, dzsogging, dzsömper, dzsörzé, dzsunka, dzsuva, dzsúsz, dzsumbuj, dzsúdó, dzsúdzsicu (both are short), Dzsenifer, Dzsesszika, Dzsibuti, Dzsószer, Dzsingisz, Dzsungária, Dzsaváharlál, Dzsaipur (meaning "joker, jungle, jam, Jeep, spear, Jihad, jig, gigolo, jacket, gentry, mosque (Arabic: جامع jami), jamboree, jazz, djinn, jogging, jumper, jersey, junk (Asian ship), dirt, juice, disorder, judo, ju-jitsu, Jennifer, Jessica, Djibouti, Djoser, Genghis, Dzungaria, Jawaharlal, Jaipur", respectively)

It is not usually doubled even when it is pronounced long, except when a word with this sound has an assimilated suffix: bridzs + dzsel: briddzsel (with the bridge game).

== Usage ==
Usage of this letter is similar to dž in Slovak or Czech. In Hungarian, even though these three characters are put together to make a different sound, they are considered one letter, and even acronyms keep the letter intact. As one can see from the examples above and below, it is almost exclusively used in foreign loanwords, to represent the voiced postalveolar affricate (j/soft g in English).

== Examples ==
The following are Hungarian loanwords (mostly taken from English) using the trigraph dzs:

- nindzsa = ninja
- dzsem = jam
- dzsip = jeep
- bendzsó = banjo
- dzsungel = jungle
- dzsessz = jazz
- lándzsa = lance
- Dzsibuti = Djibouti

== See also ==
- Hungarian alphabet
