= Hasenfratz =

Hasenfratz or Hassenfratz is a surname.

Notable people with the surname include:

- Anna Hasenfratz, Hungarian-American physicist, sister of Péter
- Frank Hasenfratz (1935–2022), Hungarian-born Canadian billionaire businessman
- Hans-Peter Hasenfratz (1938–2016), Swiss religious scholar
- Jean Henri Hassenfratz (born 1755), French chemist, physics professor, mine inspector, and participant in the French Revolution
- Linda Hasenfratz (born 1966), Canadian businesswoman
- Mike Hasenfratz (1966–2024), Canadian hockey referee
- Péter Hasenfratz (1946–2016), Hungarian-Swiss physicist, brother of Anna
