= János Sebestyén =

Hungarian organist, harpsichordist and pianist

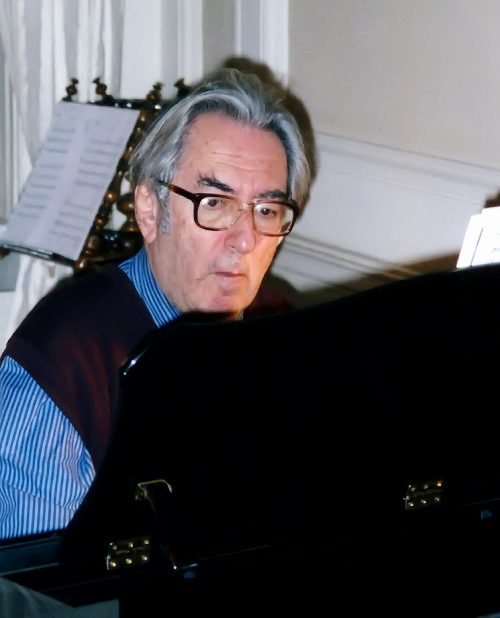
János Sebestyén at the Austrian ambassador's residence in Budapest, November 2004.

János Sebestyén (2 March 1931 – 4 February 2012) was a Hungarian organist, harpsichordist, pianist and journalist.

== Biography ==
János Sebestyén was born in Budapest, where both of his parents were prominent musicians and educators. His father, Sándor Sebestyén (1891–1962), studied cello with Adolf Schiffer and Arnold Földesy and was the author of several pedagogical works. His mother, Rózsi Mannaberg (1895–1986), studied piano with Arnold Székely and Wilhelm Backhaus.

His formal musical education began in 1946 at the State Music Secondary School as a student of pianist István Antal, organist János Hammerschlag and composer Ervin Major. He continued his studies with organist Ferenc Gergely and composer Ferenc Szabó at the Franz Liszt Academy of Music and graduated there with an organ diploma in 1955. He later attended the harpsichord class of Zuzana Růžičková in Prague. His concert tours as organ and harpsichord soloist took him to Russia, India, the Philippines, Taiwan, Japan, the United States and nearly every country in Europe.

In 1970 he established the first harpsichord class at the Franz Liszt Academy of Music. He was invited to serve on juries for organ and harpsichord competitions in France, the Czech Republic, Poland, Italy and Switzerland. In Hungary he served as president of the jury for the International Liszt Organ Competition in 1983, 1988 and 1993, and at the 1st International Harpsichord Competition, Budapest, in 2000. From 1950 on, he worked for Hungarian Radio in various capacities, serving as senior music producer between 1969 and 1994, and from 1962 until 2007 he contributed a regular series of programs documenting culture, politics and history. During his last years he contributed a monthly program to Hungarian Catholic Radio.

He made recordings for Qualiton, Hungaroton, Turnabout, CBS International, Naxos and other record labels.

== Awards ==
- Erkel Prize, 1967 (Hungary)
- Liszt Prize, 1974 (Hungary)
- Artist of Merit, 1982 (Hungary)
- Grand Prix du Disque for the Hungaroton publication Bartók Record Archives, 1982 (France)
- Cavalier of the Italian Republic, 1984 (Italy)
- Grande Comendador of the Henrique Infante State Order, 1996 (Portugal)
- Officer of the Isabella la Católica Order, 1999 (Spain)
- Cavalier of the Order of the Southern Cross, 2000 (Brazil)
- Officer of the Royal Order of the Nordic Star, 2000 (Sweden)
- Officer's Cross, 2000 (Hungary)
- Ufficiale of the Italian Republic, 2003 (Italy)

== Publications ==
- Rózsa Miklós: Életem történeteiből (Miklós Rózsa: Stories From My Life), Zeneműkiadó, Budapest, 1980; ISBN 963-330-354-0
- Azok a rádiós évtizedek... / ...és azok a rádiós évek (Those Radio Decades... / ...Those Radio Years), co-authored with Jenő Randé, Ajtósi Dürer Kiadó, Budapest, 1995; ISBN 963-8314-15-X

== Recordings ==
János Sebestyén's discography spans most of the keyboard repertoire, from works by renaissance composer Valentin Bakfark through those by contemporary composers including Frank Martin and Paul Hindemith. More than 80 LP and CD recordings have been published by various labels including Angelicum, Ariston, Balkanton, BAM, Il Canale, CBS Italiana, Fonit Cetra, Hungaroton, Naxos, Supraphon, and Vox.

Highlights:

- Paul Hindemith: Organ Sonatas Nos. 1 and 3 – Angelicum LPA 5963
- J. S. Bach: Concertos after Alessandro Marcello, Georg Philipp Telemann, etc. – Angelicum STA 9015
- Melodie di Natale (Domenico Zipoli, Girolamo Frescobaldi, etc.) – Angelicum STA 9018
- Joseph Haydn: Six Esterházy Sonatas – BAM LD 6000
- Andrea Lucchesi: Twelve Organ Sonatas – IL Canale FC U09-10
- J. S. Bach: Harpsichord Toccatas – CBS Italiana/Odissea S 54079
- Bernardo Pasquini: Organ Works – Fonit Cetra/Italia ITL 70062
- Harpsichord Recital (J. S. Bach, Sergei Prokofiev, Frank Martin, Emil Petrovics) – Hungaroton LPX 1181
- Jean-Philippe Rameau: Pieces de Clavecin en Concerts – with flautist Lóránt Kovács and cellist László Mező – Hungaroton SLPX 11453
- Joseph Haydn: Five Divertimenti – with members of the Tátrai Quartet – Hungaroton SLPX 11458
- Arcangelo Corelli: Violin Sonatas – with violinist Dénes Kovács – Hungaroton SLPX 11514-15
- J. S. Bach: Sonatas for Harpsichord – Hungaroton SLPX 11613
- Harpsichord Concertos (Domenico Cimarosa, Carlos Seixas) – led by János Rolla – Hungaroton SLPX 12392
- George Frideric Handel: Violin Sonatas – with violinist György Pauk – Hungaroton SLPD 12657-58
- Johann Adolph Hasse: Six Organ Concertos – Hungaroton HCD 31738
- Music for Two Organs (Daniel Steibelt, Muzio Clementi, etc.) – with organist Miklós Spányi – Hungaroton HCD 32167
- W. A. Mozart: Organ Music – Naxos 8.550514
- J. S. Bach: Inventions and Sinfonias – Naxos 8.550679
- Various Composers: Organ Meditation – Naxos 8.550791
- João de Sousa Carvalho: Harpsichord Works – Portugalsom 860006
- J. S. Bach: Concertos for Two, Three, and Four Harpsichords – with harpsichordist Zuzana Růžičková et al. – Supraphon 1110 4391-92
- Polish Renaissance Music for Harpsichord and Organ (Jakob Polak, Wojciech Długoraj etc.) – Vox/Candide CE 31019
- Hungarian Dances for Harpsichord (Valentin Bakfark, Johann Babnik, etc.) – Vox/Candide CE 31032
- J. S. Bach: Six Concertos after Antonio Vivaldi – Vox/Turnabout TV-S 34287
- Harpsichord Concertos (Johann Georg Albrechtsberger, Carl Ditters von Dittersdorf, etc.) – led by Vilmos Tátrai – Vox/Turnabout TV-S 34325
- Franz Liszt: Complete Organ Music – Vox Box SVBX 5328-29
- Henry Purcell: Complete Works For Harpsichord – Vox Box SVBX 5481

János Sebestyén participated in many recordings for Hungarian Radio.

Highlights:

- J. S. Bach: Six Sonatas for Violin and Harpsichord – with violinist György Pauk
- János Decsényi: Divertimento for Harpsichord and Chamber Orchestra – conducted by György Lehel
- Ferenc Farkas: Concertino for Harpsichord and Strings – conducted by György Lehel
- Jean Françaix: L'Insectarium
- Johann Ludwig Krebs: Concerto for Two Harpsichords – with Zsuzsa Pertis
- Frank Martin: Concerto for Harpsichord and Small Orchestra – conducted by György Lehel
- W. A. Mozart: Three Concertos after Johann Christian Bach – with members of the Tátrai Quartet
- Francis Poulenc: Concert champêtre – conducted by Tamás Bolberitz
