= Esperanto in Hungary =

International auxiliary language in Hungary

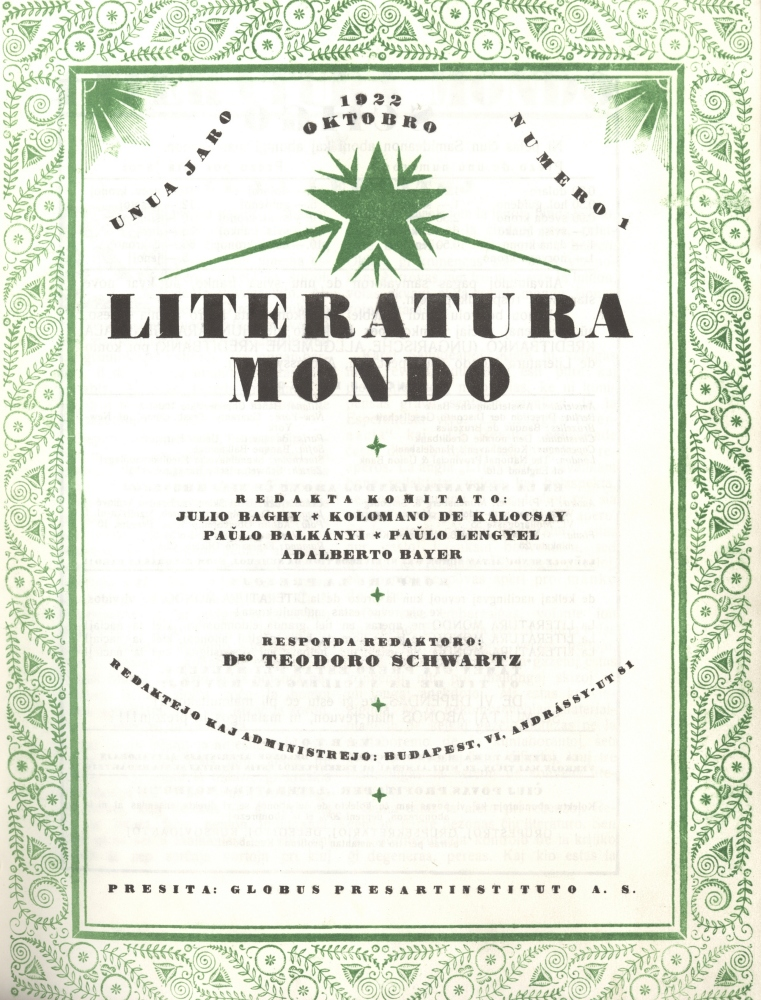
The first issue of the Literatura Mondo.

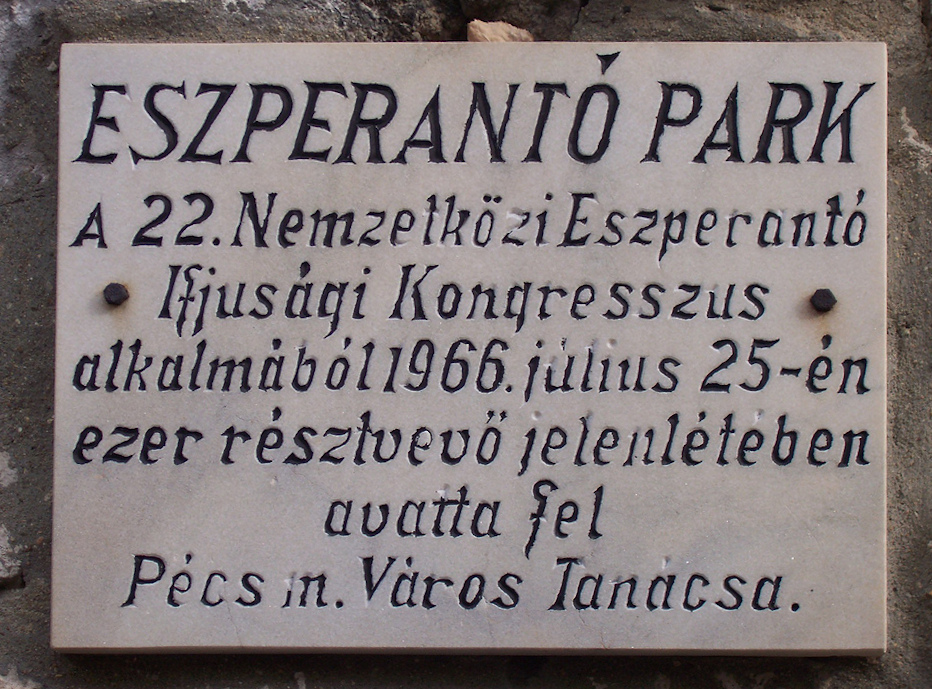
A sign in Esperanto Park in Pécs, Hungary.

Esperanto has been used in Hungary since its construction in the late-19th century. It saw notable use through the 20th century, though it was suppressed by Nazi and Communist governments in the 1940s and 1950s.

== History ==
=== Early history ===
Hungary was an early adopter of Esperanto, with some of the original Esperantists residing in Austria-Hungary in the late-19th century. In 1913, it was reported that a police officer in Székesfehérvár broke up an Esperantist meeting on account of it being a "thieves' language". During the brief period of the Hungarian Soviet Republic in 1919, many Esperantist groups supported the Communist government. Esperantist Rezső Rajczi was killed during the fall of the government and has been described as "the only known martyr for Esperanto in Hungary". The succeeding Kingdom of Hungary often restricted the use of Esperanto due to its associations with Communism in the country.

Hungary became a notable region in the Esperanto community when the Esperanto periodical Literatura Mondo was founded in Budapest by Tivadar Soros in 1922. Other notable Esperantists in Hungary at this time included linguist Géza Bárczi that wrote in Esperanto and actor Julio Baghy that learned Esperanto in 1911 and became an Esperantist writer while a prisoner-of-war in Siberia during World War I. A schism developed between the leftist and neutral factions of Esperantists in the 1930s, with leftist Esperantists founding the Hungarian Esperanto Federation in opposition to the politically neutral Esperanto Society of Hungary. During World War II, the presence of these groups was condemned by the Nazis, as both protected Esperantist Jews. The Esperantist community was targeted by the Nazis when they gained control of Hungary.

=== Hungarian People's Republic ===
In 1948, instruction of Esperanto was permitted in public schools, and the spread of Esperanto was broadly supported by the government. As the influence of Stalinism spread in eastern and central Europe, the use of Esperanto was suppressed. The Literatura Mondo was shut down in 1949, and the Esperanto Society of Hungary was shut down in 1950. Esperanto was restricted in Hungary both legally and socially, with Esperantists seen as opposed to the Communist Party.

Following Stalin's death, a significant increase of Esperantist literature and poetry occurred in the 1950s and 1960s, including that of Hungarian poets such as Imre Baranyai and Lajos Tárkony. Linguist Vilmos Benczik learned Esperanto in 1959 and helped to revive it in Hungary. Sándor Szathmári contributed to Esperantist science fiction during this time. New Esperanto groups also formed in Hungary. The Esperanto Council of Hungary was founded in 1955 and recognized by the Ministry of Education in 1956, while the Hungarian Esperanto Association was founded in 1960 and the Hungara Vivo began publication in 1961. Bertalan Farkas became the first Esperantist to go to space in 1980.

== Demographics ==
Of the first thousand recorded Esperantists, 19 were located in Austria-Hungary. Only four Esperantists were recorded in the kingdom by the 1890s, though the number increased to 211 by 1904. By 1928, the number of Esperanto speakers in Hungary had increased to 3,052 among 47 different Esperanto groups. In 1966, the World Esperanto Congress had 3,975 members in Budapest, more than most other cities surveyed. In 1979, the Universal Esperanto Association had 3,237 members in Hungary.

== See also ==
- Demographics of Hungary
- Languages of Hungary

== Bibliography ==
- Forster, Peter G. (1982). The Esperanto Movement. ISBN 9789027933997.
- Lins, Ulrich (2016). Dangerous Language — Esperanto Under Hitler and Stalin. Palgrave Macmillan. ISBN 9781349715053.
- Lins, Ulrich (2017). Dangerous Language — Esperanto and the Decline of Stalinism. Palgrave Macmillan. ISBN 9781352000207.
- Sutton, Geoffrey (2008). Concise Encyclopedia of the Original Literature of Esperanto, 1887-2007. Mondial. ISBN 9781595690906.
