= Kristóf Baráti =

Hungarian classical violinist (born 1979)

- Born: 17 May 1979 (age 46); Budapest, Hungary
- Genres: Classical
- Occupation: Violinist
- Instrument: 1703 "Lady Harmsworth" stradivarius
- Website: kristofbarati.com

Kristóf Baráti (born 17 May 1979) is a Hungarian classical violinist.

== Early life ==
Baráti was born into a musical family in Budapest in 1979. His mother played the violin and his father was a cellist. He received his first violin instruction from his mother and continued his studies with Vilmos Tátrai, the founder of the famous Tátrai Quartet.

Throughout much of his childhood, Baráti lived in Venezuela, where he began performing with leading orchestras from the age of eight. When he was eleven, he performed a recital at the Festival de Radio France in Montpellier, France.

Baráti later returned to Hungary to study at the Franz Liszt Academy of Music in Budapest, and, in 1996, he began studying in Paris with Professor Eduard Wulfson. Wulfson, who had been a student of Yehudi Menuhin, Nathan Milstein, and Henryk Szeryng, passed on to Baráti the standards which his own teachers had embodied.

== Performance career ==
Baráti has won many major prizes at international competitions. At the 1995 Gorizia Competition in Italy, Baráti won first prize. In 1996, Baráti won second prize at the Long-Thibaud-Crespin Competition. He won third prize and audience prize at the 1997 Queen Elisabeth Competition, where he was the competition's youngest competitor.

In October 2010, Barati won the Sixth International Paganini Violin Competition in Moscow. In 2014, he was awarded Hungary's highest cultural award, the Kossuth Prize.

Baráti regularly performs in Hungary with the Budapest Festival Orchestra, conducted by Iván Fischer, and with the Hungarian National Philharmonic Orchestra conducted by Zoltan Kocsis. He has also performed with many orchestras around the world, such as the Mariinsky Orchestra, Budapest Festival Orchestra, Royal Philharmonic Orchestra, Deutsches Symphonie-Orchester, NDR Symphony, NHK Symphony, and WDR Symphony Orchestra, and with many leading conductors, including Kurt Masur, Marek Janowski, Charles Dutoit, Jiří Bělohlávek, Jukka-Pekka Saraste, Mikhail Pletnev, Gilbert Varga, Iván Fischer, Jakub Hrůša, and Yuri Temirkanov.

== Instrument ==
Baráti plays the "Lady Harmsworth" violin, made in 1703 by Antonio Stradivari, offered to him by the Stradivari Society of Chicago.

== Recordings ==
- Ravel: Violin sonata no. 2; Bartók: Solo violin sonata; and Bowen: Piano sonatas no. 5. With Severin von Eckardstein (piano). (Saphir Productions 2007)
- Paganini: Violin concertos 1 & 2*. With Eiji Oue, NDR Radiophilharmonie Hannover. (Berlin Classics 2009)
- J. S. Bach: Six sonatas and partitas for solo violin (Berlin Classics 2010)
- L. van Beethoven: Complete Violin and Piano Sonatas, with Klara Würtz (Brilliant Classics, 2012)
- Eugene Ysaye: Six Sonatas for solo violin (Brilliant Classics, 2013)
- Paganini: Violin Concertos 1 & 2, with NDR Radiophilharmonie Hannover, Eiji Oue (conductor). (Brilliant Classics, 2014)
- Brahms: Complete Sonatas for Violin and Piano, with Klára Würtz (piano). (Brilliant Classics, 2014)
- Korngold: Violin Concerto and Violin-Piano Sonata; Violin Concerto in D Major, Op.35; Violin Sonata in G Major, Op.6, with Philharmonie Zuidnederland, Otto Tausk (conductor), Gábor Farkas (piano). (Brilliant Classics, 2015)
- The Soul of Lady Harmsworth (Hungaroton, 2016)
- W. A. Mozart: Complete Violin Concertos (Brilliant Classics, 2017)
