= Szár =

- Coat of arms

- Location of Fejér county in Hungary

- Location of Szár
- Coordinates: 47.47747°N 18.51609°E
- Country: Hungary
- County: Fejér

Area
  - Total: 22.63 km^{2} (8.74 sq mi)

Population (2004)
  - Total: 1,678
  - Density: 74.14/km^{2} (192.0/sq mi)
- Time zone: UTC+1 (CET)
  - Summer (DST): UTC+2 (CEST)
- Postal code: 2066
- Area code: 22
- Website: www.saar-ujb.hu/saar/

Szár is a village in Fejér county, Hungary.

The village is located in the Bicske district, on the plateau between the Vértes and Gerecse mountains, on 22.63 km^{2}, in a typical village environment.

== Famous residents ==
- Frank Hasenfratz (1935–2022), Hungarian-born Canadian billionaire businessman, founder of Linamar
- György Romhányi (1905–1991) Academic award-winning Hungarian doctor, pathologist, university professor, regular member of the Hungarian Academy of Sciences.
- József Romhányi (1908–1976. May 5) Hungarian doctor, pediatrician and university professor.
- Vilmos Benczik (1945–2021) Hungarian literary translator, linguist, book publisher, Esperantist, and professor emeritus.
