= Országh =

Országh (Slovak feminine: Országhová) is a Hungarian-language surname, meaning 'country', 'land' (today spelled ország). Notable people with the surname include:

- Ádám Országh (born 1989), Hungarian handball player
- László Országh (1907–1984), Hungarian linguist
- Pavol Országh Hviezdoslav (1849–1921), Slovak poet
- Petra Országhová (born 1981), Slovak ice hockey player
- Vítězslav Országh (born 1943), Czech weightlifter
- Vladimír Országh (born 1977), Slovak ice hockey player
