= László Országh =

Linguist, lexicographer, literary historian

- Born: October 25, 1907; Szombathely
- Died: January 27, 1984 (aged 76); Budapest
- Occupations: Hungarian linguist, literary historian, dictionary writer, university professor

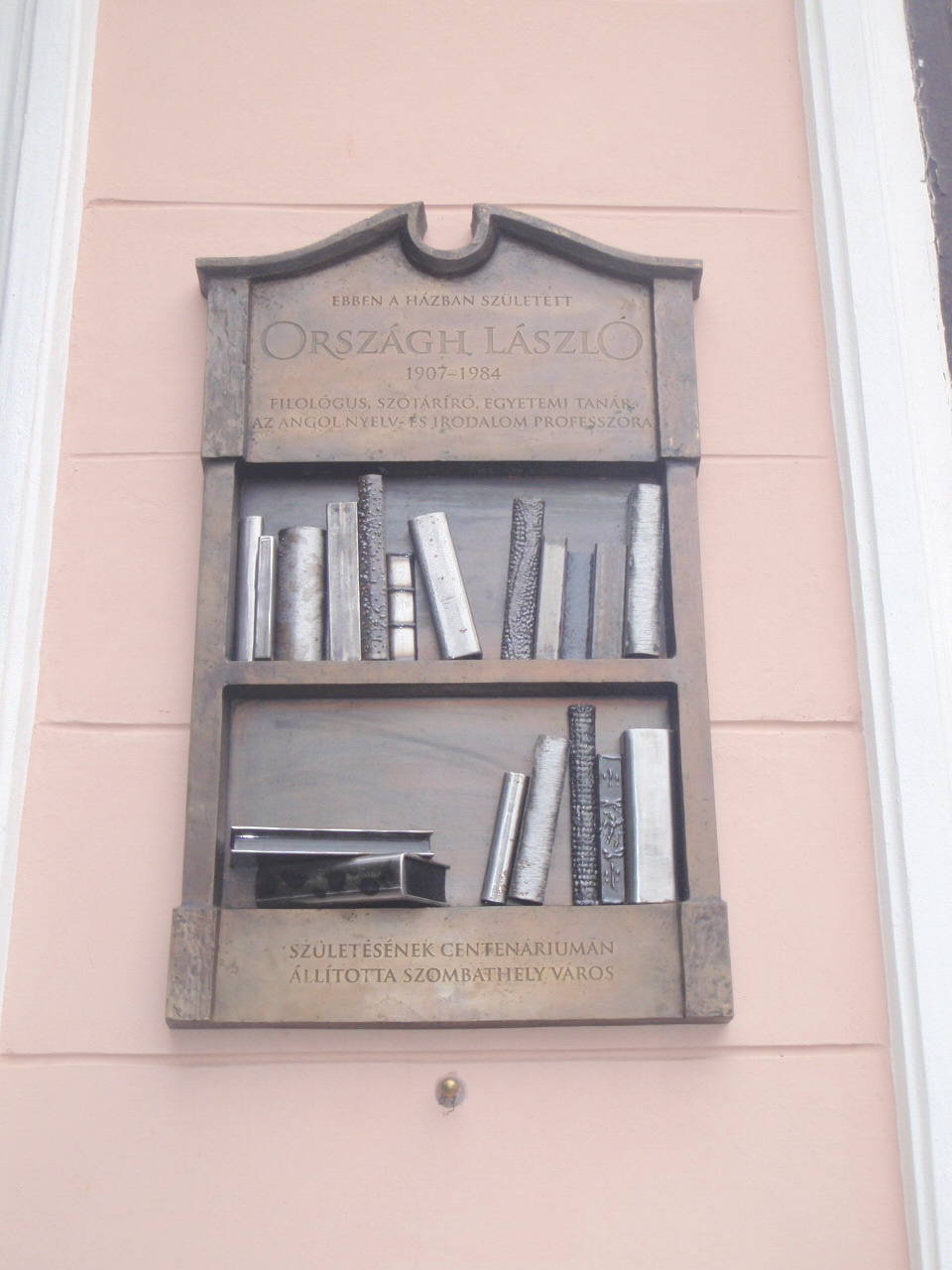
Commemorative plaque in Szombathely, on the house of his birth, at 9 Zrínyi Street

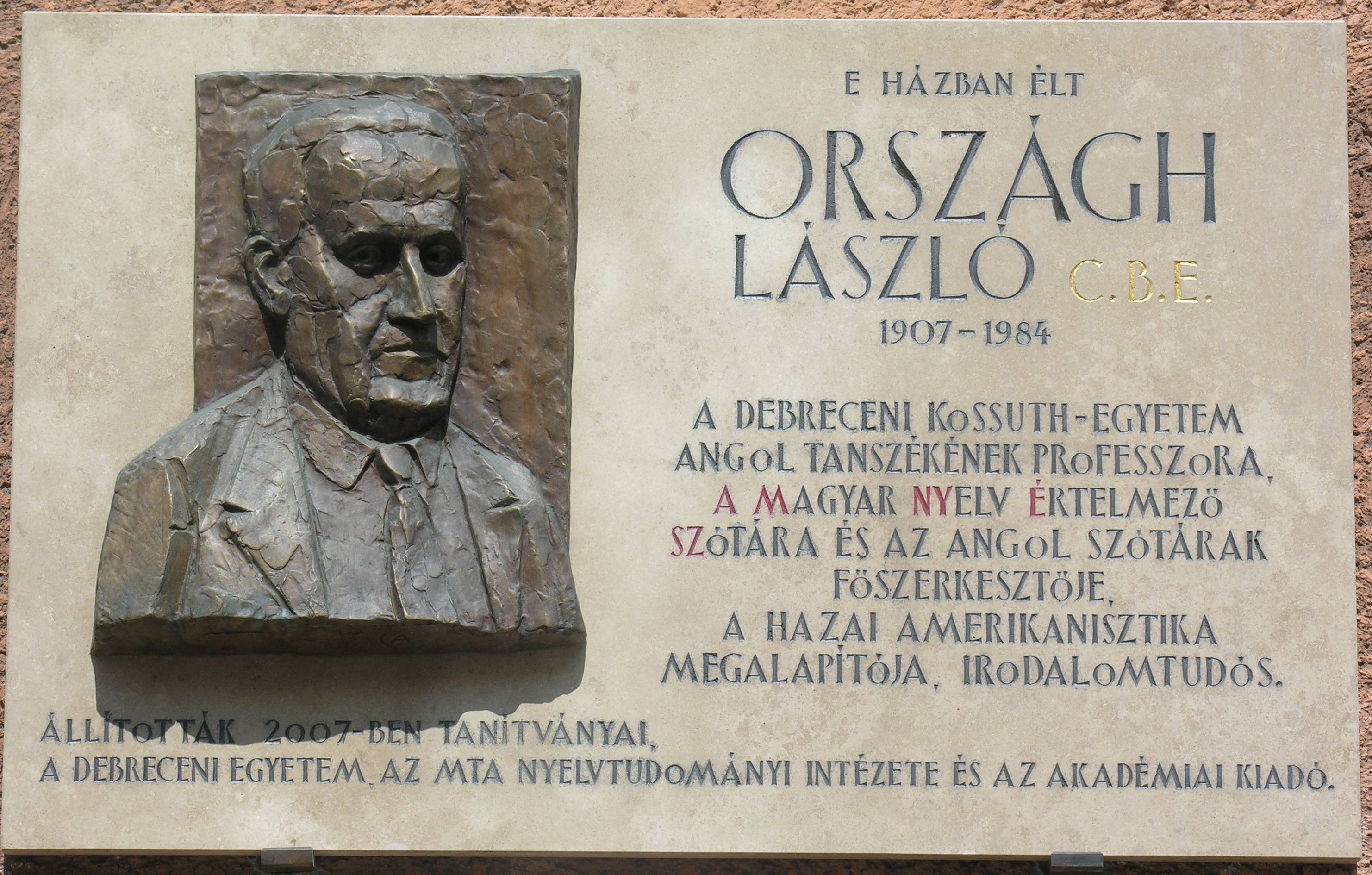
His memorial plaque at his former residence, at 12 Balaton Street (district 5 in Budapest)

László Országh (born László Pekker, October 25, 1907 – January 27, 1984) was a linguist, literary historian (the father of American Studies in Hungary), dictionary writer (author of English–Hungarian and Hungarian–English dictionaries), and university professor.

== Career ==
Born László Pekker, his family took back his maternal grandparents' surname Országh out of respect in 1925. Graduating from the Premonstratensian High School in Szombathely, he began his university studies at the Eötvös József Collegium in Budapest, then completed them with a scholarship at Rollins College in Florida. In 1935 he received a doctorate in humanities. From 1937 he was a teacher at the Eötvös Collegium, from 1942, a private lecturer at the School of English and American Studies of the Faculty of Humanities of the Eötvös Loránd University, and from 1947 to 1950 and from 1957 to 1969 he was head of the Department of English Language and Literature at the Kossuth Lajos University of Debrecen (KLTE).

Along with Géza Bárczi, he was the editor-in-chief of The Explanatory Dictionary of the Hungarian Language (1950–1962). In 1963, he launched the yearbook series of the English Department of the KLTE, one of the most important forums of English Studies in Hungary, entitled Angol Filológiai Tanulmányok ("English Philological Studies"). Through his study trips to the USA, he made a significant contribution to the establishment of American Studies in Hungary.

His main research interests included the history of English and American literature.

He is buried in the Church of St. Quirin in Szombathely; his grave site has been declared part of the National Graveyard of Hungary, in category "A", by the National Committee for Monuments and Commemoration.

== Academic honours ==
- PhD in Linguistics (1957)
- Doctor of Literary Studies (1974)
- Jubilee Gold Medal of the Institute of Linguists, London (1970)
- In December 1978, the Queen of the United Kingdom conferred on him the title of Honorary Commander of the British Empire (CBE), the first from Hungary, for his role in the promotion of the English language and culture, which he received on 24 January 1979.
- Academy Award of the Hungarian Academy of Sciences (1963)

== Works ==
- The most important and best-known works of his life are his English-Hungarian and Hungarian–English dictionaries, but he is also the father of American studies in Hungary, having published numerous treatises and studies on American literature and literary history, such as Literature in the Foxholes. What did American soldiers read? (1946), Afterword to Walt Whitman: Leaves of Grass. All Poems (1964).
- In 1950, he became head of the dictionary department of the Research Institute for Linguistics of the Hungarian Academy of Sciences, where he organized and directed the work on The Explanatory Dictionary of the Hungarian Language until its publication.
- Az amerikai irodalom története ("The History of American Literature"), Gondolat, 1967. A gap-filling work and still the only coherent overview of the three and a half centuries of American literature in Hungarian (Emlékkönyv Országh László tiszteletére [memorial book in honour of László Országh], 1993; its material was collected, edited and designed by Lehel Vadon).
- Az amerikai irodalomtörténetírás fejlődése ("The development of American literary historiography"); self-published, Bp., 1935.
- Angol diákok, angol iskolák ("English students, English schools"); Held Ny., Bp., 1936.
- Angol nyelvkönyv 1. A gimnázium és leánygimnázium V. osztálya számára ("English coursebook 1. For the fifth grade of secondary schools and girls' secondary schools"); edited by Sándor Fest, László Országh, Miklós Szenczi; Franklin, Bp., 1939.
- Angol nyelvkönyv 2. A gimnázium és leánygimnázium VI. osztálya számára ("English coursebook 2. for the sixth grade of secondary schools and girls' secondary schools"); edited by Sándor Fest, László Országh, Miklós Szenczi; Franklin, Bp., 1940.
- Angol nyelvkönyv. 3. rész A gimnázium és leánygimnázium VII. osztálya számára ("English coursebook. Part 3. For the seventh grade of secondary schools and girls' secondary schools"); edited by Sándor Fest, László Országh, Miklós Szenczi; Franklin, Bp., 1941.
- Angol nyelvkönyv. 4. rész. A gimnázium és leánygimnázium 8. oszt. számára ("English coursebook. Part 4. For the eighth grade of secondary schools and girls' secondary schools"); ed. Sándor Fest, László Országh, Miklós Szenczi; Franklin, Bp., 1941.
- Az angol regény eredete ("The origin of the English novel"); Danubia, Bp., 1941 (Minerva library).
- Bevezetés az angol nyelv- és irodalomtudomány bibliográfiájába ("Introduction to the bibliography of English language and literature"); sine nomine, Bp., 1943.
- Angol nyelvtan a gimnázium és leánygimnázium V–VIII. osztálya számára ("English grammar for grades V–VIII of secondary schools and girls' secondary schools"); edited by Sándor Kónya, László Országh; Franklin, Bp., 1944
- Shakespeare; Magyar Szemle Társaság, Bp., 1944 (Treasury. Small library of the Magyar Szemle Társaság).
- Sándor Fest–László Országh–Miklós Szenczi: Angol nyelvkönyv ("English coursebook"), 1–2; Franklin, Bp., 1946.
- Sándor Kónya–László Országh: Angol nyelvtan ("English grammar"); Franklin, Bp., 1947.
- Angol–magyar kéziszótár ("English–Hungarian concise dictionary"); ed. Országh László; Franklin, Bp., 1948.
- Magyar–angol szótár ("Hungarian-English dictionary"); Akadémiai, Bp., 1953.
- Magyar–angol kéziszótár ("Hungarian–English concise dictionary"); contributing editor: Ágnes Békés, contributor: Marianne Tamáskáné Gőbel; Akadémiai, Bp., 1955.
- Angol–magyar szótár ("English–Hungarian dictionary"); contributor: Tamás Magay; Akadémiai, Bp., 1955 (Kisszótár series).
- Sándor Kónya–László Országh: Rendszeres angol nyelvtan ("Systematic English grammar"); 3rd, revised and enlarged edition; Terra, Bp., 1957.
- A magyar nyelv értelmező szótára ("The Explanatory Dictionary of the Hungarian Language"), 1–7.; ed. Géza Bárczi, László Országh; Akadémiai, Bp., 1959–1962.
- Szöveggyűjtemény az amerikai irodalomból ("Anthology from American literature"); Eötvös Loránd University, Bp., 1960.
- Szöveggyűjtemény a reneszánsz és polgári forradalom korának angol irodalmából ("Anthology from the English literature of the Renaissance and the Civil Revolution") 1–2; Eötvös Loránd University, Bp., 1960.
- A szótárírás elmélete és gyakorlata a Magyar nyelv értelmező szótárában ("The theory and practice of dictionary writing in the Explanatory Dictionary of the Hungarian Language"); ed. László Országh; Akadémiai, Bp., 1962 (Nyelvtudományi Értekezések, "Linguistic Treatises").
- Szöveggyűjtemény az amerikai irodalomból ("An Anthology from American literature"), part 2. Second American reader; compiled by László Országh; KLTE Faculty of Humanities; KLTE BTK-Tankönyvkiadó, Debrecen-Bp., 1963.
- Shakespeare-tanulmányok ("Shakespeare studies"); edited by László Kéry, László Országh, Miklós Szenczi; Akadémiai, Bp., 1965.
- Szótártani tanulmányok. Egyetemi segédkönyv ("Lexicographical studies". University reference book); ed. László Országh; Tankönyvkiadó, Bp., 1966.
- Az amerikai irodalom története ("History of American Literature"); Gondolat, Bp., 1967.
- László Ország–Mrs. Miklós Kretzoi: A sketch of the history of American literature; Tankönyvkiadó, Bp., 1968.
- The history of Old and Middle English literature; based on lectures by László Országh, edited by Mrs. Miklós Kretzoi and Zoltán Abádi Nagy; Tankönyvkiadó, Bp., 1972.
- Bevezetés az amerikanisztikába. Egyetemi tankönyv ("Introduction to American Studies". University textbook); Tankönyvkiadó, Bp., 1972.
- Az el nem képzelt Amerika. Az amerikai esszé mesterei ("The unimagined America. Masters of the American Essay"); selection, afterword, and notes by László Országh; Európa, Bp., 1974.
- Angol eredetű elemek a magyar szókészletben ("Elements of English origin in Hungarian vocabulary"); Akadémiai, Bp., 1977 (Nyelvtudományi Értekezések, "Linguistic Treatises").
- A concise Hungarian–English dictionary; ed. Tamás Magay, László Országh; Oxford University Press-Akadémiai, Oxford–Bp., 1990
- László Országh–Zsolt Virágos. Az amerikai irodalom története. Oktatási segédanyag ("History of American Literature"; an auxiliary material for teaching, 2nd expanded edition); Eötvös, Bp., 1997.
- Országh László válogatott írásai ("Selected writings of László Országh"); ed. Zsolt Virágos, Kossuth University Press, Debrecen, 2007 (Orbis litterarum).

== Trivia ==
- István Varjú, the ZiL driver protagonist of Bulcsu Bertha's novel The Kangaroo, bought "Országh's 26-forint English–Hungarian dictionary" to help him understand a Camel advertisement.
- A well-known Easter egg in his dictionary is the pronunciation of Liverpool given in the entry of "Manchester" (possibly a joke on the irregularities of English pronunciation).
- His dictionary became so prevalent in Hungary that there was a saying (his surname being related to ország "country") that "whatever Országh knows wrongly, the whole country knows it wrongly".

== Sources ==
- This version of the article Országh László at Hungarian Wikipedia.
- (in Hungarian) László Országh in Magyar életrajzi lexikon ("Hungarian biographical lexicon") 1000-1990. MEK. (Accessed: 7 May 2010)
- (in Hungarian) Emlékkönyv Országh László tiszteletére ("Memorial book in honour of László Országh"); ed. Lehel Vadon; EKTF, Eger, 1993
- (in Hungarian) Országh László; ed. Lehel Vadon; EKTF, Eger, 1994
- (in Hungarian) Országh László; comp. Lehel Vadon; KLTE Library, Debrecen, 1997 (The work of the professors of the Kossuth Lajos University of Debrecen)
- (in Hungarian) In memoriam László Országh. Születésének 100. évfordulójára ("For the 100th anniversary of his birth"); ed. Lehel Vadon; Líceum, Eger, 2007
- (in Hungarian) In honorem László Országh, 1907–1984. Tudományos konferencia születésének centenáriuma tiszteletére ("Academic conference in honour of the centenary of his birth"); ed. Katalin Köbölkuti, Katalin Molnár; Savaria University Press–Berzsenyi Dániel Library, Szombathely, 2008 (In honorem…)
