= Géza Bárczi =

Hungarian linguist, educator

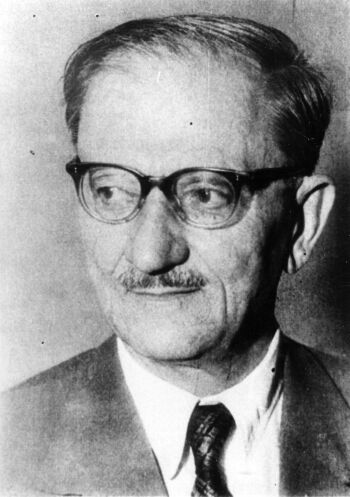
- Portrait from the University Collection of the University of Szeged
- Born: January 9, 1894; Sombor
- Died: November 7, 1975 (aged 81); Budapest
- Occupations: Hungarian linguist, Hungarian–French language historian
- Spouse(s): Renée Klotild Simond (married 1920–1962)

Géza Bárczi (Sombor, January 9, 1894 – Budapest, November 7, 1975) Kossuth Prize-winning Hungarian linguist, member of the Hungarian Academy of Sciences, Esperantist. He was one of the most outstanding Hungarian linguists of the 20th century, and an exemplary personality in the training of scholars and teachers.

His research interests included: French–Hungarian linguistic relations; French-originated vocabulary of the Hungarian language; dialectology; history of the Hungarian language: historical phonetics and morphology; language cultivation.

== Biography ==
A native speaker of Hungarian, the son of Iván Bárczi and Adalberta Sántha of Puszaszántó, brought with him German, Turkish and Esperanto language skills from the secondary school in Sombor, Serbia, and even taught there Esperanto in his senior years.

He majored in Hungarian, Latin, Greek, and later in French at the Eötvös Loránd University (then University of Budapest). In 1914, as a member of the Eötvös József Collegium, he went to France on a scholarship, but the trip ended up in an internment camp in France (the infamous "Black Monastery"), where he studied French and Spanish. Later, thanks to the intervention of the International Red Cross, he arrived in Switzerland, and only after his return home in 1920 did he obtain a degree as a teacher of Hungarian and French.

In 1932, he was habilitated as a private docent at the Franz Joseph University of Szeged in the domain of Old French Language and Language History. In 1938 his habilitation as a private docent was confirmed at the University of Budapest. From 1921 to 1941 he taught at a secondary school in Budapest. From 1932 to 1940 he taught as a private tutor at the Institute of French Philology of Szeged University. Under Géza Bárczi, the instruction of French linguistics burgeoned at the university.

From 1941 he was the head of the Department of Hungarian and Finno-Ugric Linguistics at the University of Debrecen, where he launched the periodical Magyar Nyelvjárások ("Hungarian Dialects"). Later, from 1952, he was head of the Department No. II of Hungarian Linguistics at the Eötvös Loránd University. In this position, he helped and supported the introduction of Esperanto language instruction by István Szerdahelyi from 1966, and took part in revising the Esperanto language and grammar study guides of the university. He retired from teaching on 1 July 1971.

Géza Bárczi's Esperanto poems, prose, and literary translations were published in the Esperanto-language newspaper La Verda Standardo ("The Green Flag"). He later became a member of the editorial board, then the editor-in-chief of the newspaper. In his posthumous study on Esperanto, he wrote the following: "... it would be an irreplaceable loss if, suppressed by these great languages, the bearer of the precious culture of any smaller nation were to languish, losing its independence, its own flavours and values, and gradually to become a casualty. This danger can only be averted by a completely neutral language, which no nation or other political entity can claim as its own, but which is accepted by all as a second language of mediation. That this can only be Esperanto, we can confidently hope."

== Significance ==
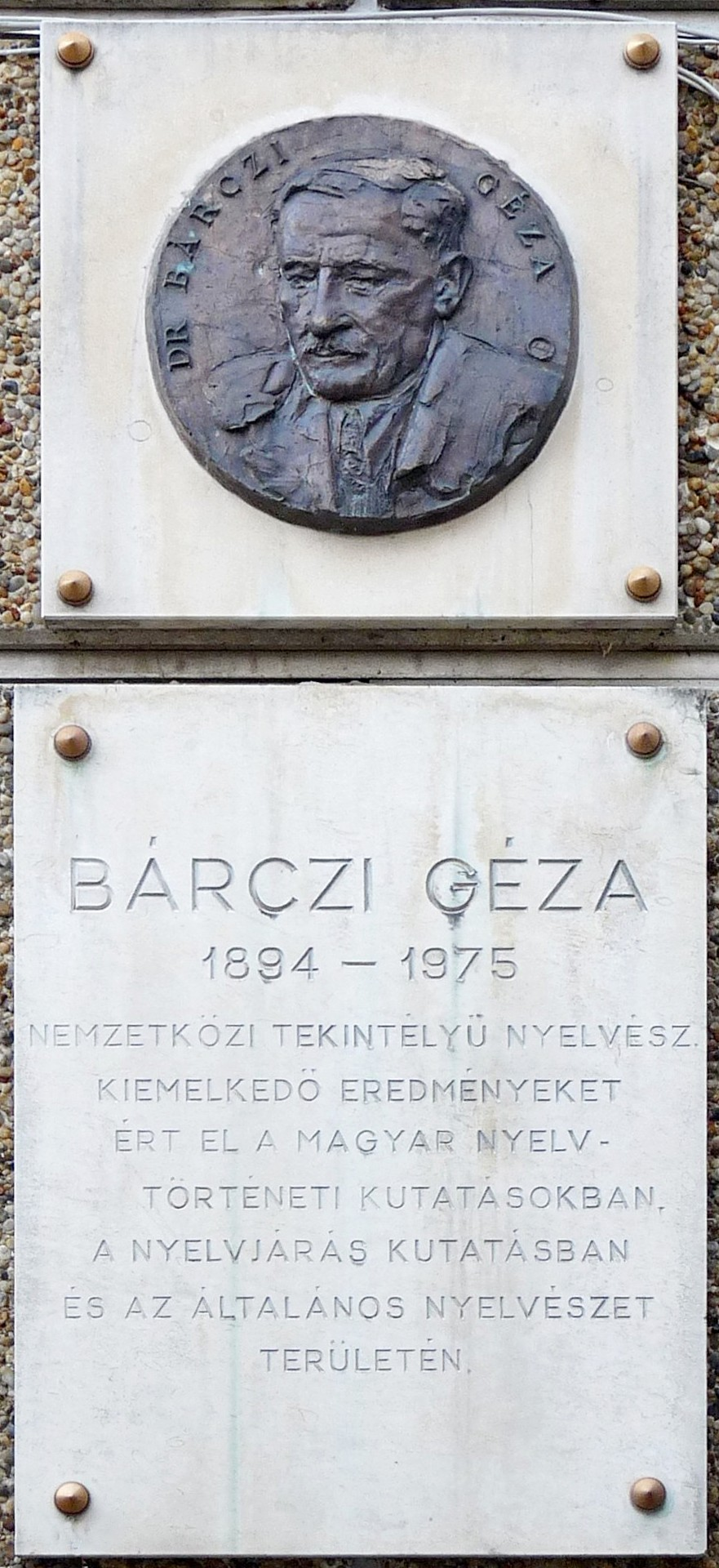
Memorial plaque to Géza Bárczi on the wall of the primary school named after him in Békásmegyer (Budapest, District 3, 2 Bárczi Géza Street)

He became a renowned scholar of French and later of Hungarian linguistics. As a teacher he was also outstanding; his students received from him a lot of knowledge, methods, attitudes, moral behaviour, human care and warmth. His best known student was the Hungarian linguist István Szathmári.

== Works (selection) ==
- A „pesti nyelv” (’The “Language of Pest”’). Budapest, 1932.
- Ó-francia hang- és alaktan (’Old French Phonetics and Morphology’). Pécs–Budapest, 1933.
- A középkori vallon–magyar érintkezésekhez (’On Medieval Walloon–Hungarian Contacts’). Budapest, 1937.
- A magyar nyelv francia jövevényszavai (’French Loanwords of the Hungarian Language’). Budapest, 1938.
- Magyar szófejtő szótár (’Etymological Dictionary of Hungarian’). Budapest, 1941.
- A nyelvtörténet felhasználása az élő nyelvek tanításában (’Using Linguistic History in the Teaching of Living Languages’). Budapest, 1942.
- Jegyzetek a budapesti népnyelvről (’Notes on the Budapest Vernacular’). Debrecen, 1943.
- Régi magyar nyelvjárások (’Old Hungarian Dialects’). Budapest, 1947.
- Fonetika (’Phonetics’). Budapest, 1951.
- A tihanyi apátság alapító levele mint nyelvi emlék (’The Establishing Charter of the Abbey of Tihany as a Linguistic Monument’). Budapest, 1951.
- A magyar szókincs eredete (’The Origin of the Hungarian Vocabulary’). Budapest, 1951.
- Bevezetés a nyelvtudományba (’Introduction to Linguistics’). Budapest, 1953.
- Magyar hangtörténet (’History of Hungarian sounds’). Budapest, 1954.
- A magyar nyelv értelmező szótára. Szerk. Országh Lászlóval. (’The Explanatory Dictionary of the Hungarian Language.’ Ed. with László Országh). Budapest, 1959–1962.
- A magyar nyelv életrajza (’Biography of the Hungarian Language’). Budapest, 1963.
- A magyar nyelv története. Társszerzőkkel (’History of the Hungarian language.’ With co-authors). Budapest, 1967.
- Nyelvművelésünk (’Our Language Cultivation’). Budapest, 1974.
- Magyar történeti szóalaktan. I. A szótövek (’Hungarian Historical Word Morphology. I. Word Stems’). Budapest, 1980.
- A magyar nyelv múltja és jelene (’The Past and Present of the Hungarian Language’). Budapest, 1980.
- A nemzetközi nyelvről (’On International Language’). Budapest, 1987.

== Membership in Editorial Boards ==
- Magyar Nyelv ("Hungarian Language")
- Magyar Nyelvőr ("Steward of the Hungarian Language")

== Other Academic Posts ==
- HAS Linguistics Committee (member)
- HAS Linguistics Working Committee (chairman)
- HAS Research Institute for Linguistics (member of the Academic Council)

== Society Memberships ==
- Hungarian Linguistic Society, Vice-President, Co-President (President: 1959–1975)
- Finno-Ugrian Society (Helsinki), honorary member (1958–)

== Awards ==
- Member of HAS (corresponding: 1939, full: 1947)
- Kossuth Prize, 2nd degree (1952)
- Order of Merit for Labour (1955)
- Gold Medal of Labour (1964)
- External Member of the Academy of Finland (1967)
- State Award of the People's Republic of Hungary, 1st degree (1970) – for his work Biography of the Hungarian Language and for his entire oeuvre.
- Honorary Doctor of the University of Debrecen (1973)

== Remembrance ==
In honour of his work, the Géza Bárczi Memorial Medal and the Géza Bárczi Prize were established for outstanding achievements in the field of linguistics. (Its winners include Béla Pomogáts in 1985, Attila Hegedűs in 1994, as well as János Péntek and István Szathmári in 1996.)

== Sources ==
- Szegedi egyetemi almanach ("University of Szeged Almanac"): 1921–1995 (1996). Volume I. Szeged, published by Rezső Mészáros. For Bárczi Géza, see p. 89. ISBN 9634820379
- This version of the article Bárczi Géza at Hungarian Wikipedia.

== Further information ==
- (in Hungarian) István Szathmári: Bárczi Géza és a magyar nyelvtudomány ("Géza Bárczi and Hungarian linguistics"). Budapest, 1978. (Special print from Nyelvtudományi Közlemények [Linguistic Publications].)
- (in Hungarian) András Kálmán and Imre Szabics: Bárczi Géza romanisztikai munkássága ("Bárczi Géza's Work in Romance Studies"). Budapest, 1988.
- (in Hungarian) Bárczi Géza-centenárium ("Géza Bárczi Centenary"). Szeged, 1994.
- (in Hungarian) Bárczi Géza-emlékkönyv születésének 100. évfordulója alkalmából ("Géza Bárczi Memorial Book on the Occasion of the 100th Anniversary of his Birth"). Budapest, 1994.
- (in Hungarian) His entry in Magyar életrajzi lexikon ("Hungarian biographical lexicon")
