= Frank Hasenfratz =

Canadian billionaire businessman and founder of Linamar (1935–2022)

- Born: 1935; Szár, Hungary
- Died: January 8, 2022 (aged 86–87); Guelph, Ontario, Canada
- Occupation: Businessman
- Years active: 1966-2022
- Notable work: (2015)
- Title: Chairman & Founder of Linamar
- Spouse: Margaret (deceased)
- Children: Linda Hasenfratz; Nancy Hasenfratz

Frank Hasenfratz CM (1935 – January 8, 2022) was a Hungarian-born Canadian billionaire businessman, the founder and owner of Linamar, Canada's second largest auto parts manufacturer, with 26,000 employees at the time of his death.

== Early life ==
Hasenfratz was an ethnic German, born in 1935 in Szár, Hungary. He left Hungary in May 1957, Canada, fleeing the failed Hungarian Revolution of 1956, first to Austria, then Italy and France. He joined the French Foreign Legion, immediately realized he had made a mistake, and deserted, boarding a freighter bound for Canada.

== Career ==
He settled in Guelph, Ontario. He went to work in a machine shop supplying fuel pumps to Ford Motor Company, but a sizable percentage of them were defective, so he quit to produce higher-quality pumps himself. He started a one-man machine shop in his basement in 1964, and then incorporated in 1966 under the name Linamar, named after his two daughters, Linda (current Linamar CEO) and Nancy, and his wife Margaret.

At the time of his death, the company employed 26,000 people in 17 countries. Hasenfratz's 23.6% stake in the company, plus share sales, dividends, and other asset groupings gave him a net worth of approximately $1 billion.

== Honours ==
In 2014, he was made a Member of the Order of Canada "for his contributions to Canada’s manufacturing industry and for his philanthropic initiatives". He was also inducted into the Canadian Manufacturing Hall of Fame and Canadian Business Hall of Fame.

== Personal life ==
Hasenfratz was predeceased by his wife Margaret. He has two daughters, Linda and Nancy, and lived in Guelph.

He died in Guelph on January 8, 2022, at the age of 86.
