= Anna Hasenfratz =

Hungarian-American physicist

Anna Hasenfratz is a Hungarian-American theoretical high energy physicist whose research involves non-perturbative theories, especially in lattice quantum chromodynamics. She is a professor of physics at the University of Colorado Boulder.

== Education and career ==
Hasenfratz was a student at Eötvös Loránd University in Hungary, where she earned a master's degree in physics in 1980 and completed her Ph.D. in 1982, under the supervision of Péter Hraskó.

She held postdoctoral and visiting positions at the Central Research Institute for Physics in Budapest, CERN in Geneva, and the University of Michigan. Next, she became an assistant research scientist and later associate professor at Florida State University from 1985 until 1988, when she moved to the University of Arizona. She moved again, to her present position at the University of Colorado Boulder, in 1989, and was promoted to full professor in 2006.

== Recognition ==
In 2008, Hasenfratz was elected as a Fellow of the American Physical Society (APS), after a nomination from the APS Division of Particles and Fields, "for her studies of nonperturbative behavior in quantum field theory, including quantum chromodynamics and models for electroweak symmetry breaking, using lattice discretization and renormalization group methods.

== Family ==
Hasenfratz is the sister of Péter Hasenfratz (1946–2016), also a theoretical physicist. Together, they published "the first correct computation of the scale parameter of quantum chromodynamics on the lattice" in 1980; a later joint publication added a third Hasenfratz as coauthor, Péter's wife Etelka.
