= Linamar =

Canadian manufacturing company

Linamar Corporation
- Type: Public
- Traded as: TSX: LNR; S&P/TSX Composite Component
- Industry: Automotive, Manufacturing of high precision machined and assembled components
- Founded: August 17, 1966, by Frank Hasenfratz as Linamar Machine Limited in Ariss, Ontario
- Headquarters: Guelph, Ontario, Canada
- Key people: Frank Hasenfratz - Founder; Linda Hasenfratz - Chairman; Jim Jarrell - President & CEO
- Number of employees: 27,000 worldwide (2019)
- Website: www.linamar.com

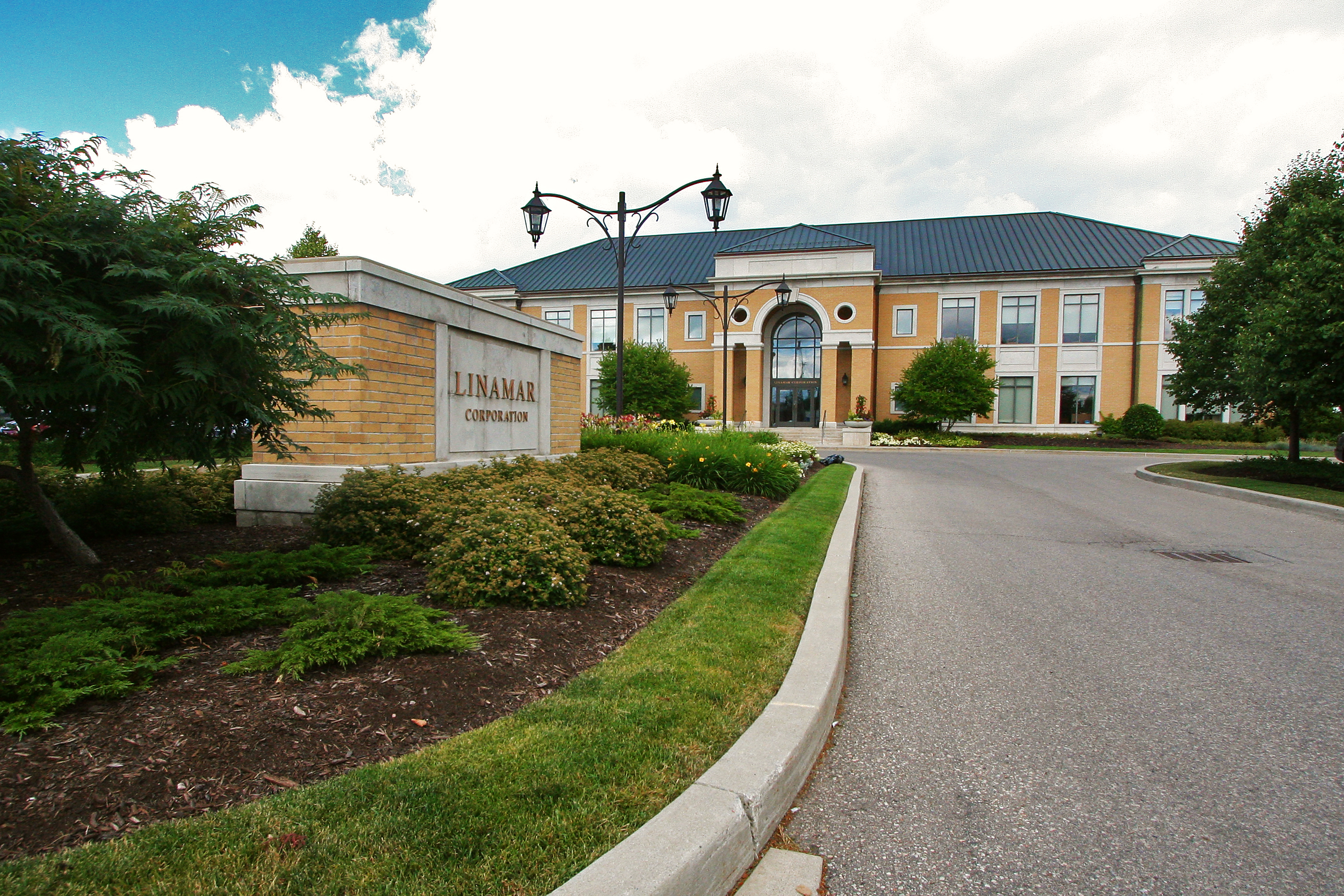
Linamar corporate headquarters

Linamar Corporation (TSX: LNR) is a manufacturing company serving the mobility, access, agriculture, and MedTech industries. The company has three operating segments: Industrial, Mobility, and eLIN.

The company has several groups. The eLIN Product Solutions Group specialises in electrification, while McLaren Engineering provides design, development, and testing services. Linamar MedTech, the company's medical group, focuses on manufacturing medical devices and precision medical components. Linamar has 26,550 employees in 65 manufacturing locations, 14 R&D centres, and 28 sales offices in 17 countries in North and South America, Europe, and Asia, which generated sales of $6.5 billion in 2021. It is Canada's second-largest automobile parts manufacturer (after Magna International). Based in Guelph, Ontario, the company's various operations employ more than 29,000 people worldwide in a total of 60 manufacturing plants, 8 R&D centres, and 25 sales offices in 17 countries located in North and South America, Europe, and Asia. Total sales in 2018 were $7.6 billion.

== History ==
Linamar was founded in 1966 by the Hungarian refugee Ferenc (Frank) Hasenfratz, who escaped from his country during the Russian crackdown precipitated by the Hungarian Revolution of 1956. He had attended technical schools in Hungary and had been employed as a toolmaker. According to Forbes, he started the small operation in his basement in 1964 in Ariss, Ontario. The company, with a staff of five, was incorporated in 1966 as Linamar Machine Limited, named after his two daughters, Linda and Nancy, and his wife Margaret.

Linamar is a major factor in the economy of Southern Ontario, Canada. As a result, the federal government agreed to provide $50.7 million in a repayable loan to Linamar through its Automotive Innovation Fund and the province pledged up to $50.25 million in a one-time grant in January 2015. That funding, plus an internal investment of $400 million (by the company), was intended for expansion that was expected to create 1,200 jobs in Guelph, Ontario, by 2025. (Over 8,000 people were employed by Linamar in that city at the time.)

An early 2018 announcement indicated that the company would receive additional funding from the federal and provincial governments, up to $101 million, for expansion that would create 1500 additional jobs and maintain 8,000 others. CEO Linda Hasenfratz, who is one of the members of the federal NAFTA advisory panel, told the news media that the funding would enable the expansion of its parts for conventional, hybrid, battery electric and fuel cell electric vehicles. At that time, the company employed 9,000 individuals in Canada, mostly in Guelph. The number of manufacturing plants in Ontario totaled 23, with all but one in Guelph. "We plan to continue to invest in this evolving factory of the future in many different ways, with a focus on areas such as vision systems, collaborative advanced robotics, incorporating sensors into our products, and collecting that data to help us improve product design," she added. A federal government press release indicated that some of the funding would support artificial intelligence, three-dimensional printing and clean technology. The provincial government's release stated that the funding would enable the company to build next-generation transmissions and drivetrains, high-efficiency engine parts and develop technologies for electric and connected vehicles. It would also help create an innovation centre for R&D on artificial intelligence, machine learning, collaborative robotics and other technology. The company planned to invest up to $500 million over the long term in high-tech programmes such as artificial intelligence.

In September 2023, Linamar acquired the propulsion-agnostic business from Mobex for $70 million. By the Spring of 2025, Linamar closed or sold most of the former Mobex Global facilities resulting in substantial job losses.

On December 21, 2023, Linamar agreed to purchase Saskatchewan's Bourgault Industries, a family-based agricultural equipment manufacturer, for $640 million.

== World presence ==
=== Canada ===
The corporate office is located in Guelph, Ontario, Canada.- 1999

==== Ariss, Ontario ====
- Ariss Mfg., 1966

==== Guelph, Ontario ====
- Autocom Mfg., 1995
- Camcor Mfg., 2005
- Camtac Mfg., 2003
- Cemtol Mfg., 1991
- Comtech Mfg., 1993
- Corvex Mfg., 1997
- Diversa Cast- 1996 (closed)
- Eston Mfg., 1999
- Emtol Mfg., 1986
- Hastech Mfg., 1985, Plant 1 and Plant 2
- Innovation Hub (iHub)
- Linergy Mfg. Inc.
- Linamar Gear
- Linamar Transportation Inc., 1999
- Linamar Performance Centre (LPC)
- Linex Mfg., 1981
- LPP Mfg. Inc., 1998
- PowerCor Mfg.
- Quadrad Mfg., 1990
- Roctel Mfg., 1987
- Skyjack Inc, Plants 1 and 2
- Spinic Mfg., 1985
- The Frank Hasenfratz Centre of Excellence in Manufacturing {The Centre}
- Transgear Mfg., 1987
- Traxle Mfg., 1990
- Vehcom Mfg., 1996
- Western Combine Co., 1989 Mfg. (closed)

==== Windsor, Ontario ====
- * Exkor Mfg., 2001

==== Winnipeg, Manitoba ====
- MacDon Industries Ltd.

=== United States ===
==== Arizona ====
- Skyjack Mfg. S.W.

Illinois

- Skyjack Product Support

==== Michigan ====
- Linamar Sales Corp.
- Linamar Structures U.S.A., Inc..
- McLaren Performance Technologies Inc. . (McLaren Engineering)

==== North Carolina ====
- Linamar, North Carolina (Pisgah & Mitchell locations)
- Linamar Forgings Carolina, Inc. (LFC)
- Linamar Light Metals Mills River, Inc. (LLMMR)

=== Mexico ===
- Engicom Ramos Arizpe, Coahuila
- Industrias de Linamar S.A. de C.V. Gomez Palacio, Durango
- Linamar de Mexico S.A. de C.V. Ramos Arizpe, Coahuila
- Linamar Driveline Systems Nuevo Laredo, Tamaulipas
- Montiac SA de CV, Torreon, Coahuila
- Skyjack Inc. Ramos Arizpe, Coahuila

=== Bulgaria ===
- Montupet EOOD, Ruse, Ruse

=== France ===
- Linamar Saint-Chamond, Saint-Chamond, Rhone-Alpes
- Linamar Montfaucon Transmission, Montfaucon, Auvergne
- Montupet SA, Clichy
- Montupet SA Laigneville, Laigneville
- Montupet SA Châteauroux, Châteauroux

=== Germany ===
- Linamar Antriebstechnik GmbH (LAT), Crimmitschau, Saxony
- Linamar Powertrain GmbH (LPT), Crimmitschau, Saxony
- Linamar Valvetrain GmbH (LVT), Thale-Warnstedt, Saxony-Anhalt
- McLaren Engineering Crimmitschau Tech Center GmbH (MCTC), Crimmitschau, Saxony
- Seissenschmidt GmbH, Plettenberg, Nordrhein-Westfalen
- Seissenschmidt Components Processing KG, Plettenberg, Nordrhein-Westfalen
- Seissenschmidt Heat Treatment KG, Halver, Nordrhein-Westfalen
- LINAMAR SEISSENSCHMIDT Hildburghausen GmbH + Co. KG, Hildburghausen, Thuringia

=== Hungary ===
- Linamar Products Division (LPD), Orosháza, Békés
- OROS Division (OROS), Orosháza, Békés
- Precision Parts Manufacturing (PPM), Békéscsaba, Békés
- Linamar Gyöngyös Kft Gyöngyös, Heves
- Linamar Technology Hungary (LTH), Békéscsaba, Békés

=== Spain ===
- Aluminio y Aleaciones, S.A., Zaragoza, Aragon

=== United Kingdom ===
- Montupet UK Ltd., Dunmurry, Northern Ireland
- Skyjack UK Ltd., Oswestry, England

=== China ===
- Linamar Automotive Systems (WUXI) Co. Ltd., Wuxi, Jiangsu
- Linamar Automotive Systems (WUXI 2), Wuxi, Jiangsu
- Linamar Tianjin Co. Ltd. (LTJ), Tianjin, Tianjin
- Linamar Asia-Pacific Group (China) Sales Office, Shanghai, Shanghai

=== India ===
- Linamar India Private Ltd (LIP), Pune, Maharashtra
- Linamar India Private Ltd (LID), Dewas, Madhya Pradesh

=== Japan ===
- Linamar Japan Sales Office, Tokyo

=== South Korea ===
- Linamar Automotive Systems Korea Ltd., Ansan-City, Kyunggi
