= Vilmos Benczik =

Hungarian linguist (1945–2021)

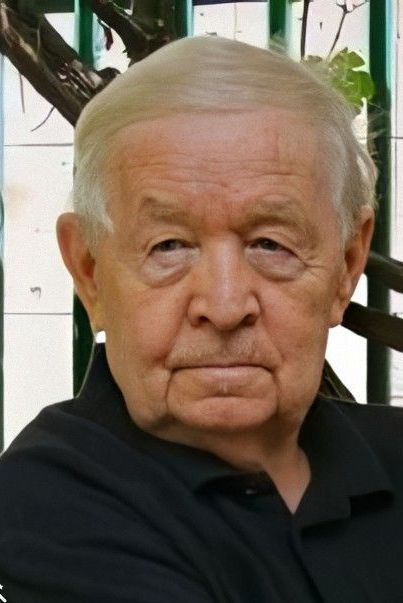
- Born: 11 July 1945; Szár, Hungary
- Died: 27 February 2021 (aged 75); Budapest, Hungary
- Occupation: Linguist

Vilmos Benczik (11 July 1945 – 27 February 2021) was a Hungarian linguist, translator, and writer who specialized in the Esperanto language.

From 1965 to 1967 and again from 1978 and 1992, he was a board member of the Hungarian Esperanto Association. From 1977 to 1980, he was Editor-in-Chief of the magazine Hungara Vivo. In 1979, he became a committee member of the Universal Esperanto Association, and served as its Fine Arts Competition president from 1986 to 2002. In 1983, he published a revised version of Hungara Antologio, the original version of which appeared fifty years earlier. In 2016, he became an Honorary Member of the Universal Esperanto Association. In 2001, he was first elected into the Akademio de Esperanto, and was reelected in 2010 and 2019.

Vilmos Benczik died in Budapest on 27 February 2021 at the age of 75.
