= Hans-Peter Hasenfratz =

Swiss religious scholar (1938–2016)

- Born: 22 February 1938; Zürich, Switzerland
- Died: 15 December 2016 (aged 78); Bochum, Germany
- Education: University of Zurich
- Known for: Groundbreaking scholarship on the phenomenology of religion
- Scientific career
- Fields: Religious scholar
- Institutions: Ruhr University Bochum

Hans-Peter Hasenfratz (22 February 1938 – 15 December 2016) was a Swiss religious scholar who was Professor of Religious Studies at the Ruhr University Bochum. He was a leading authority on the phenomenology of religion and Germanic paganism.

== Biography ==
Hans-Peter Hasenfratz was born in Zürich on 22 February 1938. Hasenfratz studied at Evangelical Theology at the University of Zurich, where Eduard Schweizer was his foremost teacher. He received his Ph.D. in 1974. His thesis, which was on the phenomenology of religion, is considered to have been of groundbreaking nature in the field. From 1985 to 2003, Hasenfratz was Professor of Religious Studies at the Ruhr University Bochum. Hasenfratz was considered a leading authority on Germanic paganism, on which he wrote widely.

== Selected works ==
- Die religiöse Welt der Germanen, 1994
- Der Tod in der Welt der Religionen, 2009
- Barbarian Rites: The Spiritual World of the Vikings and the Germanic Tribes, 2011

== Sources ==
- Classen, Albrecht [in German] (2016). Death in the Middle Ages and Early Modern Times: The Material and Spiritual Conditions of the Culture of Death. Walter de Gruyter. ISBN 9783110436976.
