= Linda Hasenfratz =

Canadian businesswoman (born 1966)

Linda Hasenfratz CM
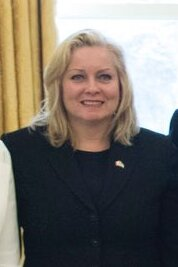
- Born: June 1966 (age 60)
- Education: University of Western Ontario
- Occupation: Businesswoman
- Title: Chairman and CEO, Linamar
- Term: 2002-
- Predecessor: Frank Hasenfratz
- Spouse: Ed Newton
- Children: 4
- Parent: Frank Hasenfratz

Linda Hasenfratz CM (born June 1966) is a Canadian businesswoman, the president, chairman, and CEO of Linamar since 2002, when she succeeded her father Frank Hasenfratz.

== Career ==
In 1990, she started her career as a machine operator at her father's car parts factory.

She has been CEO of Linamar since 2002, when she succeeded her father Frank Hasenfratz. Initially, the company faced a few rough years after Hasenfratz took over, but since then, double-digit growth has increased revenue to $6 billion, and $522 million in profit. Additionally, under Hasenfratz's leadership, there are now a total of 70 Linamar plants in 13 countries across Asia, North America and Europe. In May 2017, Hasenfratz spoke of Linamar's 23rd consecutive quarter of double-digit operating earnings growth.

In December 2020, Hasenfratz joined the COVID-19 vaccine task-force for Ontario during the COVID-19 pandemic in Ontario. Following revelations she travelled outside of the country despite travel warnings, Hasenfratz resigned from the task-force on January 19, 2021.

== Family and education ==
She is married to Ed Newton, a general contractor; they have four children.

Linda Hasenfratz is the daughter of Frank Hasenfratz, the founder of Linamar.

She has a bachelor's degree and an MBA from the University of Western Ontario.

== Recognition ==
Hasenfratz is a member of the Canadian Business Hall of Fame. In 2014, she was the first woman to be named Canada's EY Entrepreneur of the Year. She has been chair of the Business Council of Canada. In 2018 she was named Canada's Outstanding CEO of the year. Also in 2018, Hasenfratz was named to the Order of Canada. In May 2019, she was named the University of Western Ontario's 23rd Chancellor.

Academic offices
Preceded by Jack Cowin	Chancellor of the University of Western Ontario; 2015–present	Incumbent
