= Hungarian Research Centre for Linguistics =

Hungarian linguistic institute

- Nyelvtudományi Kutatóközpont
- Established: 1949
- Field of research: linguistics, incl. phonetics, lexicography, language technology, applied and theoretical linguistics
- Location: Budapest, Hungary; 47.5113°N 19.0761°E
- Affiliations: Eötvös Loránd Research Network
- Website: www.nytud.hu

The Hungarian Research Centre for Linguistics (Hungarian: Nyelvtudományi Kutatóközpont) was created in 1949. It was under the supervision of the Hungarian Academy of Sciences from 1951 until 2019, when it was moved by a governmental decree to the supervision of Eötvös Loránd Research Network. The institute conducts research in Hungarian linguistics, general, theoretical and applied linguistics, Uralic linguistics, and phonetics. The Institute also operates a public advice service on language and linguistics, prepares expert reports on relevant affairs on demand, and runs the Theoretical Linguistics Undergraduate and Doctoral Program jointly with Eötvös Loránd University.

== History ==
The Hungarian Research Centre for Linguistics was created in 1949. It was under the supervision of the Hungarian Academy of Sciences from 1951 until 2019, when it was moved by a governmental decree to the supervision of Eötvös Loránd Research Network, a decision contested by the Hungarian Academy of Sciences. It celebrated its fiftieth anniversary in 1999, by which time there had been six directors.

The first director was Zsigmond Telegdi (1909–1994), the president of the National Library Center, whose area of interest was Oriental studies, Marxist language theory and Indo-Germanic linguistics. In 1951 Gyula Németh (1890–1976), a scholar of Hungarian prehistory, took over. He was followed in 1966 by Tamás Lajos (1904–1984), in 1974 by Péter Hajdú (born 1923), in 1982 by József Herman (born 1924) and in 1992, by Ferenc Kiefer (born 1931).

== Activities ==
The institute's primary tasks include research in Hungarian linguistics, general, theoretical and applied linguistics, Uralic linguistics, and phonetics, as well as the preparation of a comprehensive dictionary of the Hungarian language, and the maintenance of its archive materials. Other research projects investigate various aspects and different variants of Hungarian. Further tasks include the assembly of linguistic corpora and databases, and laying the linguistic groundwork for computational software and applications. The Institute also operates a public advice service on language and linguistics, prepares expert reports on relevant affairs on demand, and runs the Theoretical Linguistics Undergraduate and Doctoral Program jointly with Eötvös Loránd University.
