= Tátrai Quartet =

Hungarian string quartet

The Tátrai Quartet was a Hungarian classical string quartet founded in 1946. For the half-century after World War II it was one of the foremost string quartets in Hungary, specializing in Haydn and Bartók, whose complete quartets it recorded for Hungaroton, Mozart and Beethoven as well, and were also responsible for first performances of works by certain Hungarian composers.

== Personnel ==
The membership of the quartet changed several times, but was led for its first 40 years by Vilmos Tátrai.

- 1 violin:
  - Vilmos Tátrai
- 2 violin:
  - Mihály Szűcs (active 1957, in Kodály recording) (in Bartók recordings)
  - István Várkonyi (active 1972, in Schubert quintet recording)
- viola:
  - József Iványi (active 1957, in Kodály recording)
  - György Konrád (active 1964, in Haydn Opus 76 recording)
- cello:
  - Ede Banda

== Origins and activities ==
Vilmos Tátrai (1912–1999), Professor in the Franz Liszt Academy of Music, founded the quartet in 1946 with leading members of the Budapest Capital Orchestra, later called the Hungarian State Concert Orchestra. Mihály Szűcs was concertmaster of the State Opera House, György Konrád was solo violist of the State Concert Orchestra, and Ede Banda was a professor at the Academy of Music and solo cellist of the State Concert Orchestra. The quartet won first prize at the Bartók String Quartet Competition in 1948. Tátrai soon afterwards took the first violin desk at the Hungarian State Orchestra and was still occupying it in 1982. In 1957 Tátrai founded the Hungarian Chamber Orchestra, which has no conductor, and remained its leader for more than two decades. The quartet was awarded the Kossuth Prize in 1958. By 1982 it had given the first performances of 72 Hungarian works and the Hungarian premieres of 64 works by foreign composers. The group had a repertoire of over 300 works and a history of more than 2000 performances.

Their (more than 72) recordings on the Hungaroton, Telefunken, and Muza labels include extensive surveys of Beethoven, Bartók, Mozart and Haydn.

== Sources ==
- Explanatory note in: J. Haydn: 6 "Apponyi" Quartets, op 71/74 (Hungaroton SLPX 12246–12248), Insert booklet p. 10. (Published in Hungary 1982).
