= Vilmos Tátrai =

Vilmos Tátrai (7 October 1912 – 2 February 1999) was a Hungarian classical violinist and the founder of the Tátrai Quartet.

== Life ==
Tátrai was born in Kispest, now 19th district of Budapest. A professor at the Franz Liszt Academy of Music, he founded the Tátrai Quartet in 1946 with members of the Budapest orchestra. The quartet was then formed by Tátrai on the first violin, Mihály Szűcs on the second violin, József Iványi at the viola and Vera Dénes – replaced in 1951 by Ede Banda – on the cello. In 1948, the quartet won the Bartók String Quartet Competition.

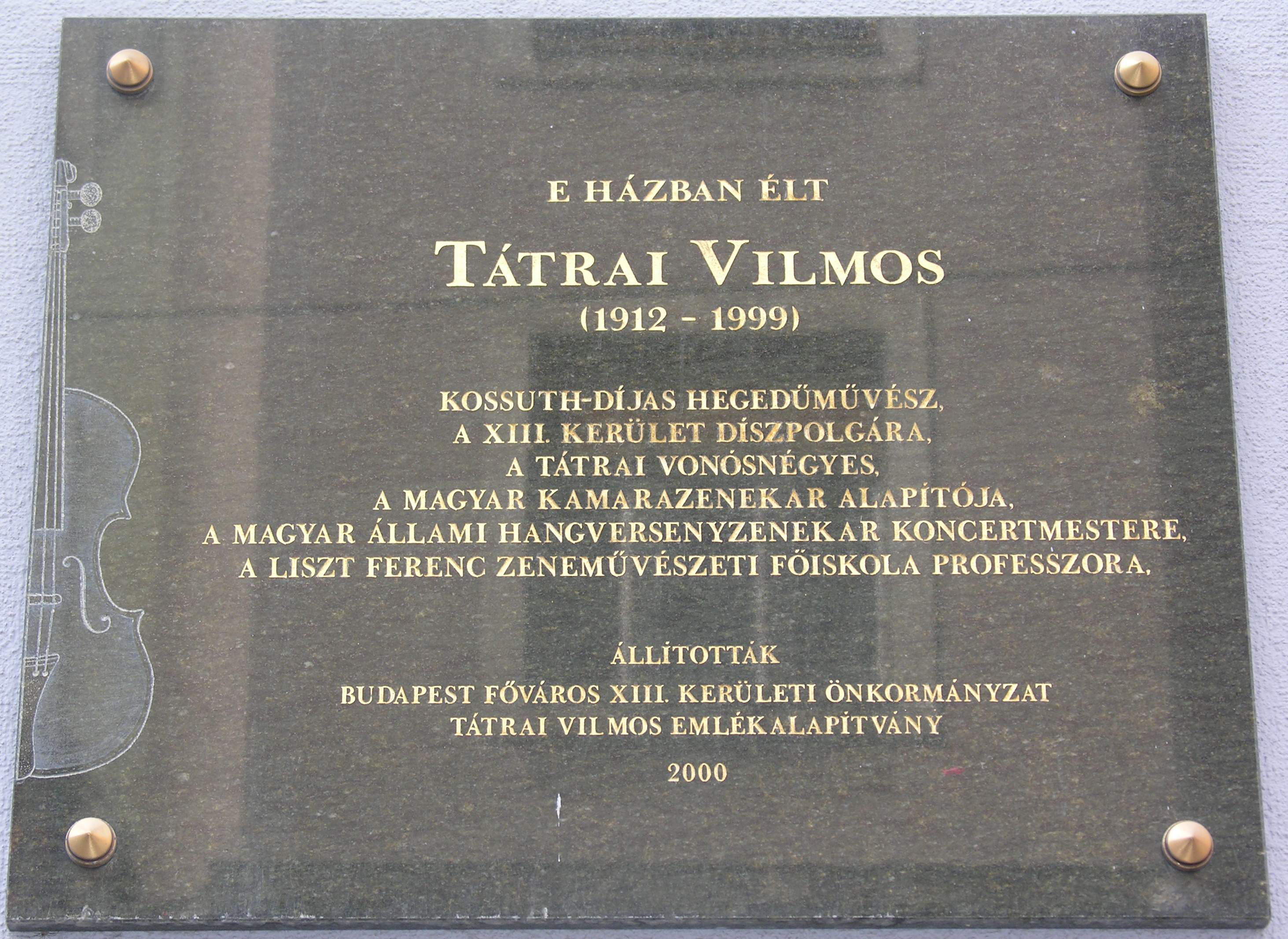
Commemorative plaque at 4 Raoul Wallenberg Street in Budapest where Vilmos Tátrai resided.

Shortly after this award, Tátrai became concertmaster of the Hungarian National Philharmonic, a position he held until 1982, when he founded the Hungarian Chamber Orchestra in 1957, of which he was the leader, although the ensemble did not have a conductor.

His autobiography was published posthumously in 2001. In 2012, on the 100th anniversary of his birth, a month-long exhibition on his life and work took place at the Müpa Budapest. Tátrai had been awarded the Kossuth Prize by the Hungarian government in 1958.
