= Old Hungarian =

Old Hungarian may refer to:

- Old Hungarian language
- Old Hungarian alphabet
- Old Hungarian (Unicode block)
