= Horné Semerovce =

Municipality of Slovakia

Horné Semerovce Felsőszemeréd
- Municipality
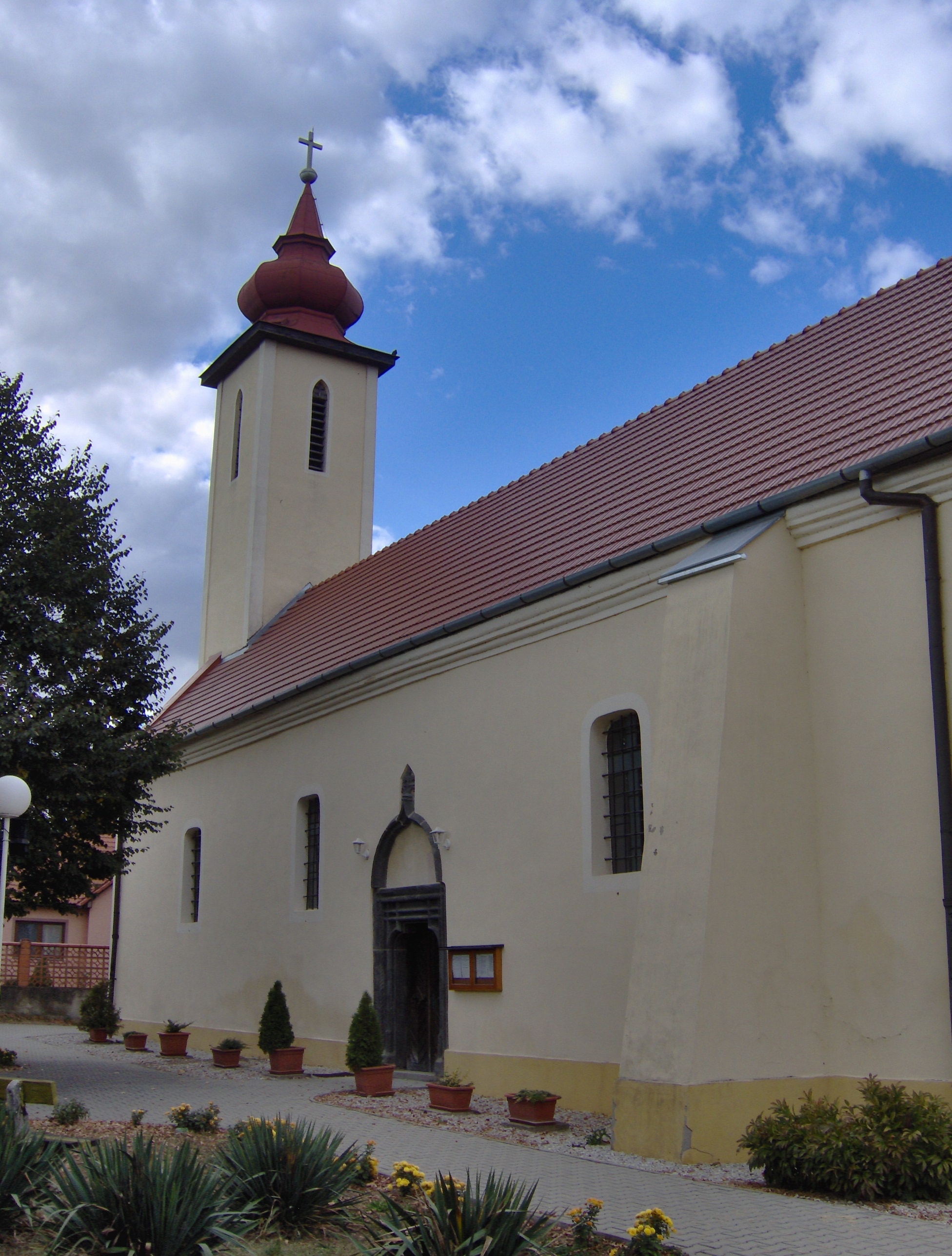

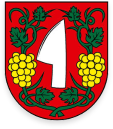
- Flag Coat of arms

- Location of Horné Semerovce in the Nitra Region Location of Horné Semerovce in Slovakia
- Coordinates: 48.13°N 18.88°E
- Country: Slovakia
- Region: Nitra Region
- District: Levice District
- First mentioned: 1268

Area
  - Total: 10.09 km^{2} (3.90 sq mi)
- Elevation: 132 m (433 ft)

Population (2025)
  - Total: 640
- Time zone: UTC+1 (CET)
  - Summer (DST): UTC+2 (CEST)
- Postal code: 935 84
- Area code: +421 36
- Vehicle registration plate (until 2022): LV
- Website: www.hornesemerovce.sk

Horné Semerovce (Hungarian: Felsőszemeréd) is a village and municipality in the Levice District in the Nitra Region of Slovakia.

== History ==
In historical records the village was first mentioned in 1268.

== Geography ==
The municipality lies at an altitude of 132 metres (433 ft) and covers an area of 10.09 km^{2} (3.90 sq mi) (2025).

== Population ==
Population statistic (10 years)
Year	1995	2005	2015	2025
Count	629	619	603	640
Difference		−1.58%	−2.58%	+6.13%

Population statistic
Year	2024	2025
Count	640	640
Difference		+0%

It has a population of 640 people (31 December 2025).

=== Ethnicity ===
Census 2021 (1+ %)
Ethnicity	Number	Fraction
Slovak	340	53.04%
Hungarian	269	41.96%
Not found out	62	9.67%
Total	641	

In year 2021 was 641 people by ethnicity 340 as Slovak, 269 as Hungarian, 62 as Not found out, 3 as Czech, 2 as Italian, 2 as Romani, 1 as Ukrainian, 1 as Polish, 1 as German and 1 as Other.

Note on population: The difference values of population numbers in the table "Population statistic" and in the sections "Ethnicity" & "Religion" is caused by the use of various statistical methods.

=== Religion ===
Census 2021 (1+ %)
Religion	Number	Fraction
Roman Catholic Church	516	80.5%
Not found out	62	9.67%
None	41	6.4%
Total	641	

In year 2021 was 641 people by religion 516 from Roman Catholic Church, 62 from Not found out, 41 from None, 6 from Greek Catholic Church, 5 from Christian Congregations in Slovakia, 4 from Evangelical Church, 3 from Calvinist Church, 2 from Other, 1 from Eastern Orthodox Church and 1 from Ad hoc movements.

== Facilities ==
The village has a public library and a football pitch.

== Genealogical resources ==
The records for genealogical research are available at the state archive "Statny Archiv in Bratislava, Nitra, Slovakia"

- Roman Catholic church records (births/marriages/deaths): 1703-1896 (parish B)
- Lutheran church records (births/marriages/deaths): 1721-1900 (parish B)

== See also ==
- List of municipalities and towns in Slovakia
