= Old Hungarian (Unicode block) =

- Range: U+10C80..U+10CFF (128 code points)
- Plane: SMP
- Scripts: Old Hungarian
- Major alphabets: Old Hungarian
- Assigned: 108 code points
- Unused: 20 reserved code points

Unicode version history
- 8.0 (2015): 108 (+108)

Unicode documentation
- Code chart ∣ Web page

Old Hungarian is a Unicode block containing characters used for writing the Old Hungarian alphabet, an obsolete script which was used to write Hungarian during the medieval period.

Old Hungarian^{[1]}^{[2]} Official Unicode Consortium code chart (PDF)
	0	1	2	3	4	5	6	7	8	9	A	B	C	D	E	F
U+10C8x	𐲀	𐲁	𐲂	𐲃	𐲄	𐲅	𐲆	𐲇	𐲈	𐲉	𐲊	𐲋	𐲌	𐲍	𐲎	𐲏
U+10C9x	𐲐	𐲑	𐲒	𐲓	𐲔	𐲕	𐲖	𐲗	𐲘	𐲙	𐲚	𐲛	𐲜	𐲝	𐲞	𐲟
U+10CAx	𐲠	𐲡	𐲢	𐲣	𐲤	𐲥	𐲦	𐲧	𐲨	𐲩	𐲪	𐲫	𐲬	𐲭	𐲮	𐲯
U+10CBx	𐲰	𐲱	𐲲													
U+10CCx	𐳀	𐳁	𐳂	𐳃	𐳄	𐳅	𐳆	𐳇	𐳈	𐳉	𐳊	𐳋	𐳌	𐳍	𐳎	𐳏
U+10CDx	𐳐	𐳑	𐳒	𐳓	𐳔	𐳕	𐳖	𐳗	𐳘	𐳙	𐳚	𐳛	𐳜	𐳝	𐳞	𐳟
U+10CEx	𐳠	𐳡	𐳢	𐳣	𐳤	𐳥	𐳦	𐳧	𐳨	𐳩	𐳪	𐳫	𐳬	𐳭	𐳮	𐳯
U+10CFx	𐳰	𐳱	𐳲								𐳺	𐳻	𐳼	𐳽	𐳾	𐳿
Notes: 1. As of Unicode version 16.0; 2. Grey areas indicate non-assigned code points

== History ==
The following Unicode-related documents record the purpose and process of defining specific characters in the Old Hungarian block:

Version	Final code points (Note: Proposed code points and characters names may differ from final code points and names)	Count	L2 ID	WG2 ID	Document
8.0	U+10C80..10CB2, 10CC0..10CF2, 10CFA..10CFF	108	L2/98-033	N1686	Everson, Michael (1998-01-18), Draft proposal to encode Old Hungarian in Plane 1 of ISO/IEC 10646
8.0	U+10C80..10CB2, 10CC0..10CF2, 10CFA..10CFF	108	L2/98-220	N1758	Everson, Michael (1998-05-02), On encoding the Old Hungarian rovásírás in the UCS
8.0	U+10C80..10CB2, 10CC0..10CF2, 10CFA..10CFF	108	L2/98-286	N1703	Umamaheswaran, V. S.; Ksar, Mike (1998-07-02), "8.19", Unconfirmed Meeting Minutes, WG 2 Meeting #34, Redmond, WA, USA; 1998-03-16--20
8.0	U+10C80..10CB2, 10CC0..10CF2, 10CFA..10CFF	108	L2/99-010	N1903 (pdf, html, doc)	Umamaheswaran, V. S. (1998-12-30), "8.2.9", Minutes of WG 2 meeting 35, London, U.K.; 1998-09-21--25
8.0	U+10C80..10CB2, 10CC0..10CF2, 10CFA..10CFF	108	L2/08-268	N3483	Everson, Michael; Szelp, André Szabolcs (2008-08-04), Preliminary proposal for encoding the Old Hungarian script in the UCS
8.0	U+10C80..10CB2, 10CC0..10CF2, 10CFA..10CFF	108	L2/08-353	N3526	Bakonyi, Gábor (2008-09-30), Hungarian Native Writing Draft Proposal
8.0	U+10C80..10CB2, 10CC0..10CF2, 10CFA..10CFF	108	L2/08-354	N3527	Hosszú, Gábor (2008-09-30), Proposal for encoding the Szekler-Hungarian Rovas in the BMP and the SMP of the UCS
8.0	U+10C80..10CB2, 10CC0..10CF2, 10CFA..10CFF	108	L2/08-356	N3531	Everson, Michael; Szelp, André Szabolcs (2008-10-12), Revised proposal for encoding the Old Hungarian script in the UCS
8.0	U+10C80..10CB2, 10CC0..10CF2, 10CFA..10CFF	108	L2/08-355	N3532	Everson, Michael (2008-11-02), Mapping between Old Hungarian proposals in N3531, N3527, and N3526
8.0	U+10C80..10CB2, 10CC0..10CF2, 10CFA..10CFF	108	L2/09-059R	N3566R	Bakonyi, Gábor (2009-02-05), Hungarian Native Writing Proposal
8.0	U+10C80..10CB2, 10CC0..10CF2, 10CFA..10CFF	108	L2/09-092		Bakonyi, Gábor (2009-02-23), Distinct Close "Ë" Letter in the Native Hungarian Text Named Rudimenta? Working document about Fig.8. of N3483
8.0	U+10C80..10CB2, 10CC0..10CF2, 10CFA..10CFF	108	L2/09-093		Bakonyi, Gábor (2009-02-23), Code Collissions [sic] in the Proposal of Michael Everson! Working document with error samples from N3532
8.0	U+10C80..10CB2, 10CC0..10CF2, 10CFA..10CFF	108	L2/09-142	N3615	Everson, Michael; Szelp, André Szabolcs (2009-04-16), Second revised proposal for encoding the Old Hungarian script in the UCS
8.0	U+10C80..10CB2, 10CC0..10CF2, 10CFA..10CFF	108		N3634	Pentzlin, Karl (2009-04-21), Towards an Encoding of Old Hungarian – Comments on N3527 and N3615
8.0	U+10C80..10CB2, 10CC0..10CF2, 10CFA..10CFF	108	L2/09-165	N3637	Anderson, Deborah (2009-04-22), Outstanding Issues on Old Hungarian/Szekler-Hungarian Rovas/Hungarian Native Writing
8.0	U+10C80..10CB2, 10CC0..10CF2, 10CFA..10CFF	108	L2/09-168	N3640	Anderson, Deborah (2009-04-22), Old Hungarian/Szekler-Hungarian Rovas Ad hoc report
8.0	U+10C80..10CB2, 10CC0..10CF2, 10CFA..10CFF	108	L2/09-234	N3603 (pdf, doc)	Umamaheswaran, V. S. (2009-07-08), "M54.17", Unconfirmed minutes of WG 2 meeting 54
8.0	U+10C80..10CB2, 10CC0..10CF2, 10CFA..10CFF	108	L2/09-240	N3664	Everson, Michael; Szelp, André Szabolcs (2009-07-23), Proposal for encoding generic punctuation used with the Hungarian Runic script
8.0	U+10C80..10CB2, 10CC0..10CF2, 10CFA..10CFF	108	L2/09-333	N3697	Everson, Michael; Szelp, André Szabolcs (2009-10-14), Proposal for encoding the Hungarian Runic script
8.0	U+10C80..10CB2, 10CC0..10CF2, 10CFA..10CFF	108	L2/09-399		Bakonyi, Gábor (2009-10-30), CODE COLLISSIONS IN THE PROPOSAL OF MICHAEL EVERSON! Working document with error samples from N3532-N3697
8.0	U+10C80..10CB2, 10CC0..10CF2, 10CFA..10CFF	108	L2/09-400		Bakonyi, Gábor (2009-10-30), Distinct Close "Ë" Letter in the Native Hungarian Text Named Rudimenta?
8.0	U+10C80..10CB2, 10CC0..10CF2, 10CFA..10CFF	108	L2/11-087	N4007	Revised proposal for encoding the Szekely-Hungarian Rovas script in the SMP of the UCS, 2011-01-21
8.0	U+10C80..10CB2, 10CC0..10CF2, 10CFA..10CFF	108	L2/11-088	N4006	Revised proposal for encoding the Carpathian Basin Rovas script in the SMP of the UCS, 2011-01-21
8.0	U+10C80..10CB2, 10CC0..10CF2, 10CFA..10CFF	108	L2/11-089	N3999	Revised proposal for encoding the Khazarian Rovas script in the SMP of the UCS, 2011-01-21
8.0	U+10C80..10CB2, 10CC0..10CF2, 10CFA..10CFF	108	L2/11-177	N4064	Anderson, Deborah (2011-05-07), Comparison of Hungarian Runic and Szekely-Hungarian Rovas proposals
8.0	U+10C80..10CB2, 10CC0..10CF2, 10CFA..10CFF	108	L2/11-165	N4042	Everson, Michael (2011-05-08), Mapping between Hungarian Runic proposals in N3697 and N4007
8.0	U+10C80..10CB2, 10CC0..10CF2, 10CFA..10CFF	108	L2/11-207	N4055	Hosszú, Gábor (2011-05-15), Notes on the Szekely-Hungarian Rovas script
8.0	U+10C80..10CB2, 10CC0..10CF2, 10CFA..10CFF	108		N4076	Comments on encoding the Rovas scripts, 2011-05-22
8.0	U+10C80..10CB2, 10CC0..10CF2, 10CFA..10CFF	108	L2/11-226	N4080	Issues of encoding the Rovas scripts, 2011-05-25
8.0	U+10C80..10CB2, 10CC0..10CF2, 10CFA..10CFF	108	L2/11-242R	N4110R	Hungarian Runic/Sekely-Hungarian Rovas Ad-hoc Report, 2011-06-08
8.0	U+10C80..10CB2, 10CC0..10CF2, 10CFA..10CFF	108		N4120	Hosszú, Gábor (2011-07-05), Response to the Ad-hoc Report N4110 about the Rovas scripts
8.0	U+10C80..10CB2, 10CC0..10CF2, 10CFA..10CFF	108	L2/11-261R2		Moore, Lisa (2011-08-16), "Consensus 128-C37", UTC #128 / L2 #225 Minutes
8.0	U+10C80..10CB2, 10CC0..10CF2, 10CFA..10CFF	108	L2/11-337		Hosszú, Gábor (2011-09-12), Letter regarding Old Hungarian
8.0	U+10C80..10CB2, 10CC0..10CF2, 10CFA..10CFF	108	L2/11-342		Umamaheswaran, V. S. (2011-09-19), Feedback on current Old Hungarian Script in Unicode / 10646
8.0	U+10C80..10CB2, 10CC0..10CF2, 10CFA..10CFF	108		N4144	Hosszú, Gábor (2011-10-12), Revised proposal for encoding the Carpathian Basin Rovas script in the SMP of the UCS
8.0	U+10C80..10CB2, 10CC0..10CF2, 10CFA..10CFF	108		N4145	Hosszú, Gábor (2011-10-12), Revised proposal for encoding the Khazarian Rovas script in the SMP of the UCS
8.0	U+10C80..10CB2, 10CC0..10CF2, 10CFA..10CFF	108		N4103	"11.3 Hungarian Runic/Szekely-Hungarian Rovas", Unconfirmed minutes of WG 2 meeting 58, 2012-01-03
8.0	U+10C80..10CB2, 10CC0..10CF2, 10CFA..10CFF	108	L2/12-014	N4183	Hosszú, Gábor (2012-01-11), Revised proposal for encoding the Szekely-Hungarian Rovas, Carpathian Basin Rovas and Khazarian Rovas scripts into the Rovas block in the SMP of the UCS
8.0	U+10C80..10CB2, 10CC0..10CF2, 10CFA..10CFF	108	L2/12-036	N4196	Code chart fonts for Old Hungarian, 2012-01-28
8.0	U+10C80..10CB2, 10CC0..10CF2, 10CFA..10CFF	108	L2/12-037	N4197	Szelp, André Szabolcs (2012-01-30), Remarks on Old Hungarian and other scripts with regard to N4183
8.0	U+10C80..10CB2, 10CC0..10CF2, 10CFA..10CFF	108	L2/12-070	N4222	Hosszú, Gábor (2012-02-02), Response to the N4197 about the Rovas scripts
8.0	U+10C80..10CB2, 10CC0..10CF2, 10CFA..10CFF	108	L2/12-073	N4225	Rumi, Tamás (2012-02-04), Proposal for encoding pre-combined and extended Rovas numerals into the Rovas block in the SMP of the UCS
8.0	U+10C80..10CB2, 10CC0..10CF2, 10CFA..10CFF	108		N4224	Sípos, László (2012-02-05), The contemporary Rovas usage and Rovas user community representation
8.0	U+10C80..10CB2, 10CC0..10CF2, 10CFA..10CFF	108		N4227	Hosszú, Gábor (2012-02-06), Code chart font for Rovas block
8.0	U+10C80..10CB2, 10CC0..10CF2, 10CFA..10CFF	108	L2/12-088	N4232	Róna-Tas, András (2012-02-09), Letter re Hungarian
8.0	U+10C80..10CB2, 10CC0..10CF2, 10CFA..10CFF	108	L2/12-089	N4224-A	Sípos, László (2012-02-10), Stand points of the user community, stake holders regarding to encoding Rovas scripts
8.0	U+10C80..10CB2, 10CC0..10CF2, 10CFA..10CFF	108		N4237	Hosszú, Gábor (2012-02-12), Response to the contribution N4232 about the Rovas scripts
8.0	U+10C80..10CB2, 10CC0..10CF2, 10CFA..10CFF	108	L2/12-189	N4267	Szondi, Miklós (2012-05-08), Declaration of Support for the Advancement of the Encoding of the old Hungarian Script
8.0	U+10C80..10CB2, 10CC0..10CF2, 10CFA..10CFF	108		N4274	Somfai, Tamás (2012-05-25), Contemporary Rovas in the word processing
8.0	U+10C80..10CB2, 10CC0..10CF2, 10CFA..10CFF	108	L2/12-220		Rumi, Tamás; Rózsa, György (2012-06-08), Letter from Mandorla Public Education Association
8.0	U+10C80..10CB2, 10CC0..10CF2, 10CFA..10CFF	108	L2/12-218		Deák, Dezső (2012-06-26), Specifying request/proposal before encoding the Szekely-Hungarian Rovas in the UCS
8.0	U+10C80..10CB2, 10CC0..10CF2, 10CFA..10CFF	108	L2/12-219	N4288	Rumi, Tamás (2012-06-26), Minutes of the Rovas Working Group
8.0	U+10C80..10CB2, 10CC0..10CF2, 10CFA..10CFF	108		N4253 (pdf, doc)	"M59.01b", Unconfirmed minutes of WG 2 meeting 59, 2012-09-12
8.0	U+10C80..10CB2, 10CC0..10CF2, 10CFA..10CFF	108	L2/12-168	N4268R	Everson, Michael; Szelp, André Szabolcs (2012-10-02), Consolidated proposal for encoding the Old Hungarian script in the UCS
8.0	U+10C80..10CB2, 10CC0..10CF2, 10CFA..10CFF	108	L2/12-331	N4367	Demeczky, Jenő; Hosszú, Gábor; Rumi, Tamás; Sípos, László; Zelliger, Erzsébet (2012-10-14), Revised proposal for encoding the Rovas in the UCS
8.0	U+10C80..10CB2, 10CC0..10CF2, 10CFA..10CFF	108	L2/12-332	N4371	Demeczky, Jenő; Giczi, György; Hosszú, Gábor; Kliha, Gergely; Obrusánszky, Borbála; Rumi, Tamás; Sípos, László; Zelliger, Erzsébet (2012-10-21), Additional information about the name of the Rovas script
8.0	U+10C80..10CB2, 10CC0..10CF2, 10CFA..10CFF	108		N4373	Gyetvay, György Gergely (2012-10-22), Resolutions of the 8th Hungarian World Congress on the encoding of Old Hungarian
8.0	U+10C80..10CB2, 10CC0..10CF2, 10CFA..10CFF	108	L2/12-337		Demeczky, Jenő; Giczi, György; Hosszú, Gábor; Kliha, Gergely; Obrusánszky, Borbála; Rumi, Tamás; Sípos, László; Zelliger, Erzsébet (2012-10-24), About the consensus of the Rovas encoding - Response to N4373
8.0	U+10C80..10CB2, 10CC0..10CF2, 10CFA..10CFF	108	L2/12-334	N4374R	Everson, Michael (2012-11-12), Old Hungarian/Szekely-Hungarian Rovas Ad-hoc Report
8.0	U+10C80..10CB2, 10CC0..10CF2, 10CFA..10CFF	108	L2/12-343R2		Moore, Lisa (2012-12-04), "Consensus 133-C6, 133-C7", UTC #133 Minutes
8.0	U+10C80..10CB2, 10CC0..10CF2, 10CFA..10CFF	108	L2/13-028		Anderson, Deborah; McGowan, Rick; Whistler, Ken; Pournader, Roozbeh (2013-01-28), "14", Recommendations to UTC on Script Proposals
8.0	U+10C80..10CB2, 10CC0..10CF2, 10CFA..10CFF	108	L2/13-049	N4422	Demeczky, Jenő; Ivanyos, Lajos; Hosszú, Gábor; Rumi, Tamás; Sípos, László; Zelliger, Erzsébet (2013-03-07), Declaration for removing the "Hungarian" block from DAM
8.0	U+10C80..10CB2, 10CC0..10CF2, 10CFA..10CFF	108		N4420	Szondi, Miklós (2013-05-05), Declaration in support of the encoding of Hungarian
8.0	U+10C80..10CB2, 10CC0..10CF2, 10CFA..10CFF	108		N4353 (pdf, doc)	"M60.05a", Unconfirmed minutes of WG 2 meeting 60, 2013-05-23
8.0	U+10C80..10CB2, 10CC0..10CF2, 10CFA..10CFF	108	L2/13-132		Moore, Lisa (2013-07-29), "Consensus 136-C13", UTC #136 Minutes, "Change the script, block, and character names of "Hungarian" to "Old Hungarian"."
8.0	U+10C80..10CB2, 10CC0..10CF2, 10CFA..10CFF	108	L2/13-218	N4492	Demeczky, Jenő; Ivanyos, Lajos; Hosszú, Gábor; Rumi, Tamás; Sípos, László; Somfai, Tamás; Zelliger, Erzsébet (2013-10-26), Declaration for removing the "Old Hungarian" block from DAM
8.0	U+10C80..10CB2, 10CC0..10CF2, 10CFA..10CFF	108		N4403 (pdf, doc)	Umamaheswaran, V. S. (2014-01-28), "Resolution M61.01 and M61.02 item a", Unconfirmed minutes of WG 2 meeting 61, Holiday Inn, Vilnius, Lithuania; 2013-06-10/14
